= Dim sum =

Chinese cuisine

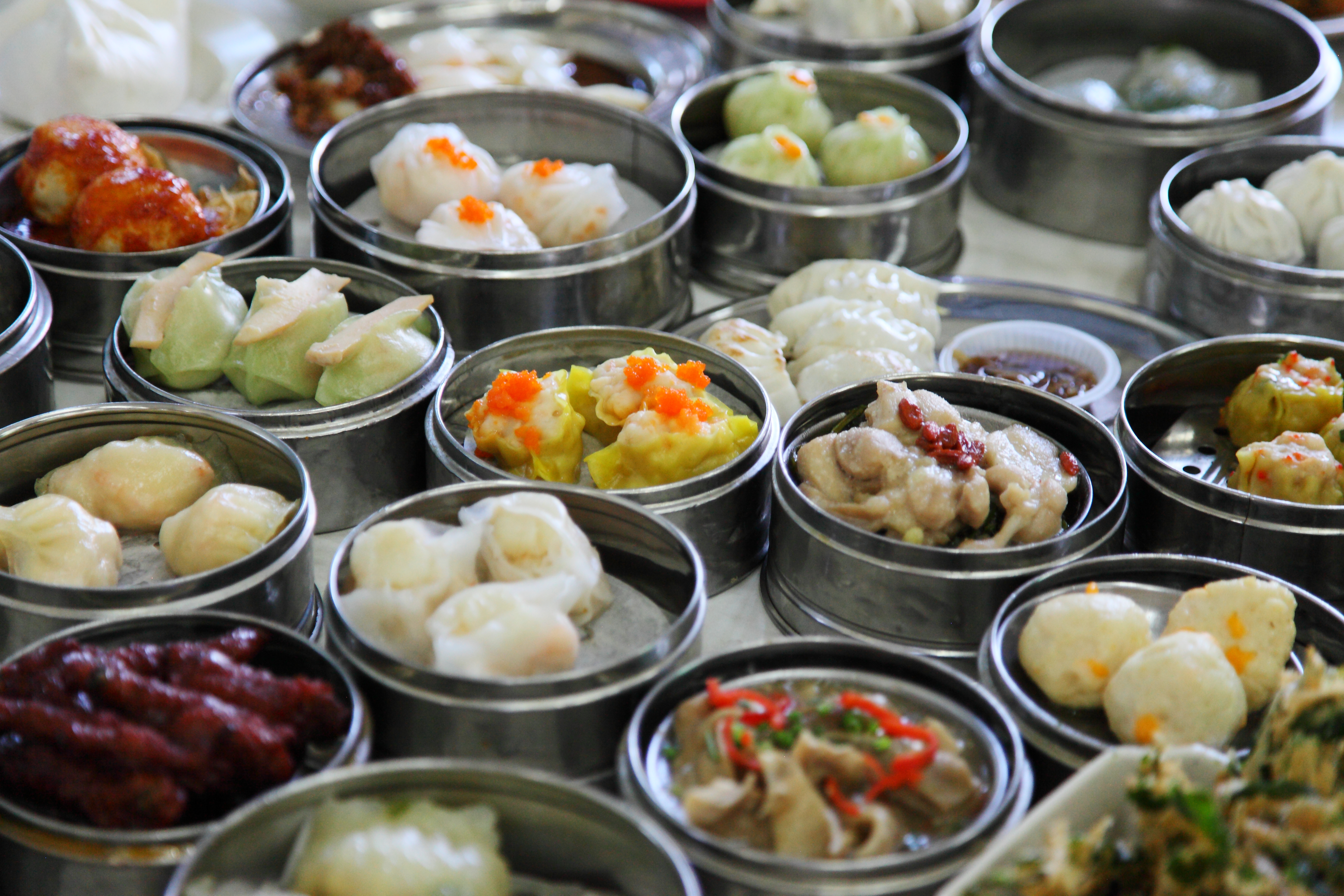

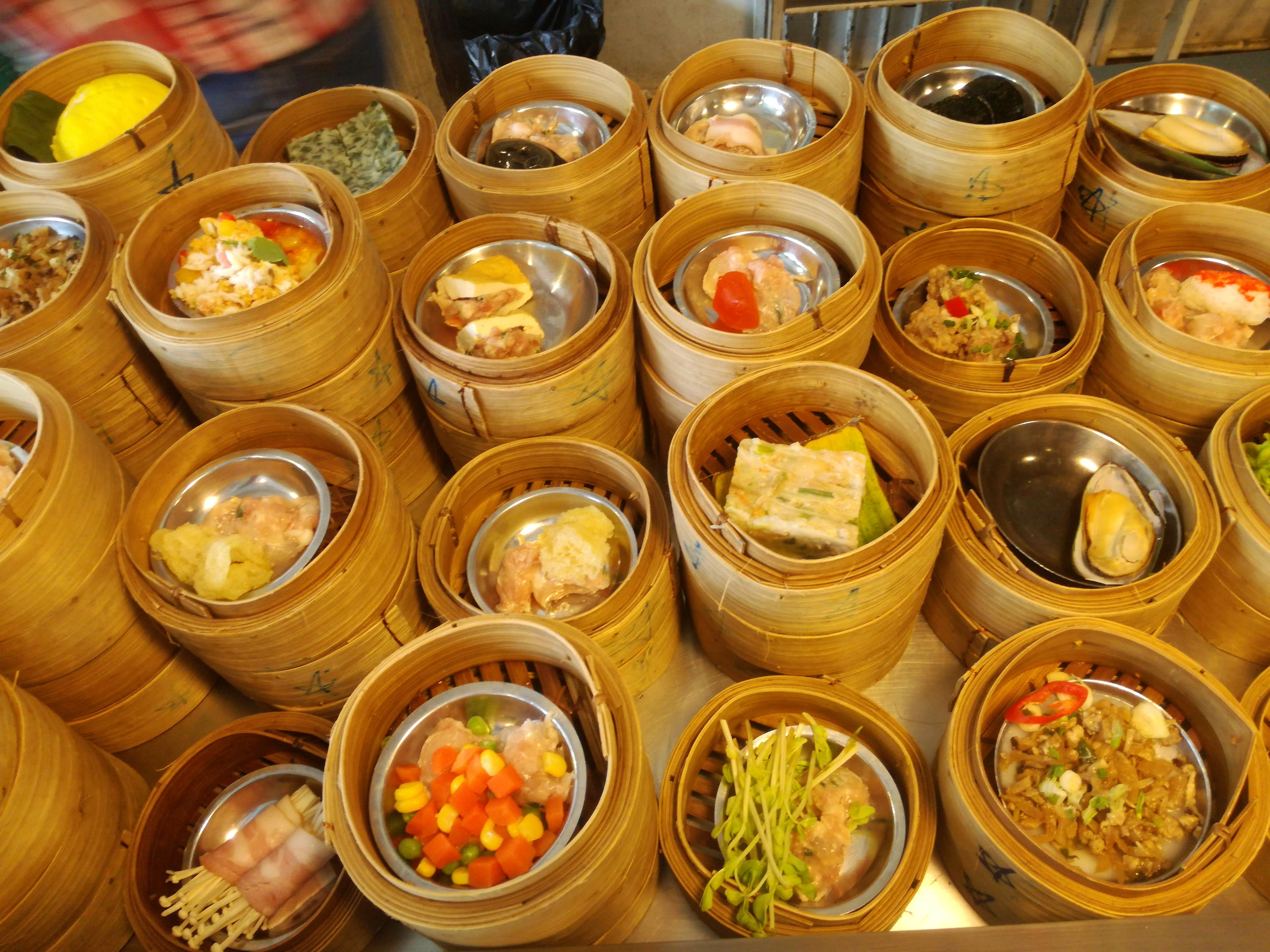
- Traditional Chinese: 點心
- Simplified Chinese: 点心
- Jyutping: dim^{2} sam^{1}
- Cantonese Yale: dím sām
- Literal meaning: "refresh one's heart"
Transcriptions
Standard Mandarin
- Hanyu Pinyin: diǎnxīn
- Bopomofo: ㄉㄧㄢˇ ㄒㄧㄣ
- Wade–Giles: tien^{3}-hsin^{1}
- Tongyong Pinyin: diǎn-sin
- IPA: [tjɛ̀n.ɕín]
Wu
- Wugniu: tie^{3} sin^{1}
- IPA: Shanghainese: [ti˧ ɕin˦]
Hakka
- Romanization: tiám-sîm
Yue: Cantonese
- Yale Romanization: dím sām
- Jyutping: dim^{2} sam^{1}
- IPA: [tim˧˥ sɐm˥]
Southern Min
- Hokkien POJ: tiám-sim

Dim sum (traditional Chinese: 點心; simplified Chinese: 点心; pinyin: diǎn xīn; Jyutping: dim^{2} sam^{1}) is a large range of small Chinese dishes that are traditionally eaten in restaurants for brunch. Most modern dim sum dishes are commonly associated with Cantonese cuisine, although dim sum dishes also exist in a few other Chinese cuisines. In the tenth century, when the city of Canton (Guangzhou) began to experience an increase in commercial travel, many frequented teahouses for small-portion meals with tea called yum cha (brunch). Yum cha includes two related concepts. The first is "one bowl with two pieces" (一盅兩件), in reference to the custom of serving teahouse customers two delicately made food items, savory or sweet, to complement their tea. The second is "dim sum", which translates literally to "touch the heart", the term used to designate the small food items that accompanied the tea.

Teahouse owners gradually added various snacks called dim sum to their offerings. The practice of having tea with dim sum eventually evolved into the modern yum cha. Cantonese dim sum culture developed rapidly during the latter half of the nineteenth century in Guangzhou. Cantonese dim sum was originally based on local foods. As dim sum continued to develop, chefs introduced influences and traditions from other regions of China. Cantonese dim sum has a very broad range of flavors, textures, cooking styles, and ingredients and can be classified into regular items, seasonal offerings, weekly specials, banquet dishes, holiday dishes, house signature dishes, and travel-friendly items, as well as breakfast and lunch foods and late-night snacks.

Some estimates claim that there are at least two thousand types of dim sum in total across China, but only about forty to fifty types are commonly sold outside of China. There are over one thousand dim sum dishes originating from Guangdong alone, a total that no other area in China comes even close to matching. In fact, the cookbooks of most Chinese food cultures tend to combine their own variations on dim sum dishes with other local snacks. But that is not the case with Cantonese dim sum, which has developed into a separate branch of cuisine.

Dim sum restaurants typically have a wide variety of dishes, usually totaling several dozen. The tea is very important, just as important as the food. Many Cantonese restaurants serve dim sum as early as five in the morning, while more traditional restaurants typically serve dim sum until mid-afternoon. Some restaurants in Hong Kong and Guangdong province even offers dim sum all day till late night. Dim sum restaurants have a unique serving method where servers offer dishes to customers from steam-heated carts. It is now commonplace for restaurants to serve dim sum at dinner and sell various dim sum items à la carte for takeout. In addition to traditional dim sum, some chefs also create and prepare new fusion-based dim sum dishes. There are also variations designed for visual appeal on social media, such as dumplings and buns made to resemble animals.

== Etymology ==
The original meaning of the term "dim sum" remains unclear and contested. Some references state that the term originated in the Eastern Jin dynasty (317 AD–420 AD). According to one legend, to show soldiers gratitude after battles, a general had civilians make buns and cakes to send to the front lines. "Gratitude" (點點心意; dim2 dim2 sam1 ji3), later shortened to dim sum (點心), came to represent dishes made similarly.

Some versions date the legend to the Southern Song dynasty (960–1279) after the term's earliest attestation in the Book of Tang. Written in the Five Dynasties and Ten Kingdoms period (907–979), the book uses dim sum as a verb instead (Chinese: 治妝未畢, 我未及餐, 爾且可點心, "I have not finished preparing myself and am not ready for a proper meal; therefore, you can treat yourself to some small snacks.") In this context, "dim sum" means "to barely fill your stomach". Dim sum dishes are usually associated with "yum cha" (飲茶), which is known as the Cantonese brunch tradition. Chinese food historian Yan-kit So has described dim sum as:

Literally translated as "so close to the heart", they are, in reality, a large range of hors d'oeuvres Cantonese people traditionally enjoy in restaurants (previously teahouses) for breakfast and lunch but never for dinner, washed down with tea. "Let's go yum cha" (to drink tea) is understood among the Cantonese to mean going to a restaurant for dim sum; such is the twin linkage between the food and the beverage.

== Cuisine ==
There are at least two thousand types of dim sum in total across China, and over one thousand available in Guangdong alone. Dim sum are usually eaten as breakfast or brunch. Cantonese dim sum has a very broad range of flavors, textures, cooking styles, and ingredients, and can be classified into regular items, seasonal offerings, weekly specials, banquet dishes, holiday dishes, house signature dishes, travel-friendly, as well as breakfast or lunch foods and late night snacks.

The subtropical climate of the southeast quadrant of Guangdong partly influences dim sum's portion size. It can cause a decrease in appetite, so that people prefer eating scaled-down meals throughout the day rather than the customary three large meals. Teahouses in Guangzhou served "three teas and two meals," which included lunch and dinner, and breakfast, afternoon, and evening teas with dim sum.

Many dim sum dishes are made of seafood, chopped meats, or vegetables wrapped in dough or thin wrappings and steamed, deep-fried, or pan-fried. A traditional dim sum brunch includes various types of steamed buns, such as cha siu bao (a steamed bun filled with barbecue pork), rice or wheat dumplings, and rice noodle rolls that contain a range of ingredients, including beef, chicken, pork, prawns, and vegetarian options. Many dim sum restaurants also offer plates of steamed green vegetables, stuffed eggplant, stuffed green peppers, roasted meats, congee and other soups. Dessert dim sum is also available and can be ordered at any time since there is not a set sequence for the meal.

It is customary to order "family-style", sharing the small dishes consisting of three or four pieces of dim sum among all members of the dining party. Small portion sizes allow people to try a wide variety of food.

=== Dishes ===
Dim sum restaurants typically have a wide variety of dishes, usually several dozen.

==== Dumplings ====
Name	Image	Name	Description
Shrimp dumpling		蝦餃; haa1 gaau2	steamed dumpling with shrimp filling.
Teochew dumpling		潮州粉粿; ciu4 zau1 fan2 gwo2	steamed dumpling with peanuts, garlic, Chinese chives, pork, dried shrimp, and Chinese mushrooms.
Chive dumpling		韭菜餃; gau2 coi3 gaau2	steamed dumpling with Chinese chives.
Xiaolongbao		小籠包; siu2 lung4 baau1	dumplings containing a rich broth and filled with meat or seafood.
Tangbao		灌湯包; gun3 tong1 baau1	soup-filled steamed buns
Guotie		鍋貼; wo1 tip3	pan-fried dumpling, usually with meat and cabbage filling.
Shark fin dumpling		魚翅餃; jyu4 ci3 gaau2	steamed dumplings with shrimp, crab sticks, shiitake, and straw mushrooms.
Shumai		燒賣; siu1 maai6	steamed dumplings with pork and prawns, usually topped off with crab roe and mushroom.
Taro dumpling		芋角; wu6 gok3	deep-fried dumpling made with mashed taro and stuffed with diced mushrooms, shrimp, and pork.
Haam seui gok		鹹水角; haam4 seoi2 gok3	deep-fried dumpling with a slightly savory filling of pork and chopped vegetables in a sweet and sticky wrapping.
Dumpling soup		灌湯餃; gun3 tong1 gaau2	soup with one or two big dumplings.
Wonton		雲吞; wan4 tan1	dumpling filled with ground pork and shrimp

==== Rolls ====
Name	Image	Chinese	Description
Spring roll		春捲; ceon1 gyun2	a deep-fried roll with various sliced vegetables (such as carrots, cabbage, mushrooms, and wood ear fungus) and sometimes meat.
Tofu skin roll		腐皮捲; fu6 pei4 gyun2	a roll made of tofu skin filled with various meats and sliced vegetables.
Fresh bamboo roll		鮮竹卷; sin1 zuk1 gyun2	a roll made of tofu skin filled with minced pork and bamboo shoot, typically served in an oyster sauce broth.
Four-treasure chicken roll		四寶雞扎; sei3 bou2 gai1 zaat3	a roll made of tofu skin filled with chicken, Jinhua ham, fish maw (花膠), and Chinese mushroom.
Cifantuan		粢飯團; zi1 faan6 tyun4	steamed glutinous rice rolls
Rice noodle roll		腸粉; coeng4 fan2	steamed rice noodles with or without meat or vegetable filling. Popular fillings include: beef, dough fritter, shrimp, and barbecued pork. Often served with sweetened soy sauce.
Zhaliang		炸兩; zaa3 loeng5	steamed rice noodles rolled around youjagwai (油炸鬼), typically doused in soy sauce, hoisin sauce, or sesame paste, and sprinkled with sesame seeds.
Duckfeet Roll		鴨腳扎; aap3 goek3 zaat3	Duck feet wrapped in bean curd sheets.

==== Buns ====
Name	Image	Chinese	Description
Barbecued pork bun		叉燒包; caa1 siu1 baau1	bun with barbecued pork filling steamed to be white and fluffy. 叉燒餐包; chāshāo cān bāo; chāsīu chāan bāau is a variant that is glazed and baked for a golden appearance.
Sweet cream bun		奶黃包; naai5 wong4 baau1	steamed bun with milk custard filling.
Lotus seed bun		蓮蓉包; lin4 jung4 baau1	steamed bun with lotus seed paste filling.
Pineapple bun		菠蘿包; bo1 lo4 baau1	a usually sweet bread roll that does not contain pineapple but has a topping textured like pineapple skin.
Longevity peach		壽桃; sau6 tou4	lotus seed bun sometimes with a filling made of red bean paste or lotus paste.
Steamed Chinese Sausage Rolls		臘腸卷; laap6 coeng4 gyun2	steamed chinese sausage in a bun

==== Cakes ====
Name	Image	Chinese	Description
Turnip cake		蘿蔔糕; lo4 baak6 gou1	pudding made from a mix of shredded white radish, bits of dried shrimp, Chinese sausage and mushroom that is steamed, sliced, and pan-fried.
Taro cake		芋頭糕; wu6 tau4 gou1	pudding made of taro.
Water chestnut cake		馬蹄糕; maa5 tai4 gou1	pudding made of crispy water chestnut; some restaurants also serve a variation made with bamboo juice.
Nian gao		年糕; nin4 gou1	glutinous rice flour cake, sweetened, usually with brown sugar.
Red Date Cake		紅棗糕; hung4 zou2 gou1	Dessert made with dried jujubes and tapioca flour.
Thousand-layer cake		千層糕; cin1 cang4 gou1	a dessert made of many layers of salted egg dough.
Malay sponge cake		馬拉糕; maa5 laai1 gou1	sponge cake consisting of lard or butter, flour, and eggs.
White sugar sponge cake		白糖糕; baak6 tong4 gou1	steamed sponge cake made with white sugar.

==== Meats ====
Name	Image	Chinese	Description
Steamed meatball		牛肉丸; ngau4 juk6 jyun4	steamed meatballs served on thin tofu skin. Generally served with Worcestershire sauce.
Pearl meatballs		珍珠丸子; zan1 zyu1 jyun4 zi2	steamed meatballs coated with glutinous rice. Traditionally from Hubei and Hunan.
Lion's Head		獅子頭; si1 zi2 tau4	pork meatballs or beef meatballs stewed with vegetables.
Phoenix claws		鳳爪; fung6 zaau2	deep fried, boiled, and then steamed chicken feet with douchi. "White Cloud Phoenix Claws" (白雲鳳爪; baak6 wan4 fung6 zaau2) is a plain steamed version.
Spare ribs		排骨; paai4 gwat1	steamed pork spare ribs with douchi and sometimes garlic and chili.
Beef tendon		牛筋; ngau4 gan1	Beef tendons are cooked for a long time until it is very tender. In Hong Kong, it is usually served together with beef brisket and/or radish.
Reticulum beef tripe		金錢肚; gam1 cin4 tou5	
Omasum beef tripe		牛百葉; ngau4 baak3 jip6; or 牛柏葉	
Shrimp toast		蝦多士; haa1 do1 si6	Bread coated with a paste made from minced shrimp and cooked by baking or deep frying.

==== Seafood ====
Name	Image	Chinese	Description
Deep fried squid		椒鹽魷魚; ziu1 jim4 jau4 jyu4	similar to fried calamari, the battered squid is deep-fried.
Curry squid			squid served in curry broth.

==== Vegetables ====
Name	Image	Chinese	Description
Steamed gai lan		芥蘭; gaai3 laan4	Steamed vegetables served with oyster sauce, popular varieties include lettuce (生菜; sang1 coi3), choy sum (菜心; coi3 sam1), gai lan (芥蘭; gaai3 laan4), or water spinach (蕹菜; ung3 coi3).
Fried tofu		炸豆腐; zaa3 dau6 fu6	deep fried tofu with salt and pepper.

==== Rice ====
Name	Image	Chinese	Description
Lotus leaf rice		糯米雞; no6 mai5 gai1	glutinous rice wrapped in a lotus leaf that typically contains egg yolk, dried scallop, mushroom, and meat (usually pork and chicken). A lighter variant is known as "pearl chicken" (珍珠雞; zan1 zyu1 gai1).
Chinese sticky rice		糯米飯; nuòmǐ fàn; noh máih faahn	stir-fried (or steamed) glutinous rice with Chinese sausage, soy sauce-steeped mushrooms, sweet spring onions, and sometimes chicken marinated with a mixture of spices including five-spice powder.
Congee		粥; zhōu; jūk	many kinds of rice porridge, such as the "Preserved Egg and Pork Porridge" (皮蛋瘦肉粥; pídàn shòuròu zhōu; pèihdáan sauyuhk jūk).

==== Desserts ====
Name	Image	Chinese	Description
Egg tart		蛋撻; daan6 taat3	baked tart with egg custard filling.
Douhua		豆腐花; dau6 fu6 faa1	soft tofu served with a sweet ginger or jasmine syrup.
Sesame ball		煎堆; zin1 deoi1	deep fried chewy dough with various fillings (lotus seed, black bean, red bean pastes) coated in sesame seeds.
Coconut pudding		椰汁糕; je4 zap1 gou1	light and spongy but creamy coconut milk pudding made with a thin, clear jelly layer made with coconut water on top.
Mango pudding		芒果布甸; mong4 gwo2 bou3 din6	a sweet, rich mango pudding often served with a topping of evaporated milk and large chunks of fresh mango.
Mango pomelo sago		楊枝甘露; joeng4 zi1 gam1 lou6	A Hong Kong dessert made with diced mango, pomelo, sago, coconut milk, and milk.
Black sesame roll		芝麻卷; zi1 maa4 gyun2	Refrigerated thin layer of black sesame paste
Chinese flaky pastry		叉烧酥; caa1 siu1 sou1	Also called Char Siu So. They are triangular, flaky pastries filled with a savory and slightly sweet barbecued pork filling, topped with sesame seeds for added flavor.
Ox-tongue pastry		牛脷酥; ngau4 lei6 sou1	a fried oval-shaped dough resembling an ox tongue that is similar to youjagwai, but sugar is added to the flour.
Tong sui		糖水; tong4 seoi2	sweet dessert soups; popular varieties include black sesame soup (芝麻糊), red bean soup (紅豆沙), mung bean soup (綠豆沙), sai mai lo (西米露), guilinggao (龜苓膏), peanut paste soup (花生糊), and walnut soup (核桃糊).
Sweet potato soup		番薯糖水; faan1 syu4 tong4 seoi2	sweet dessert soups containing sweet potato, rock sugar, and ginger.
Black sesame soup		芝麻糊; zi1 maa4 wu4	sweet dessert soups containing Black sesame seed flour;

=== Tea ===
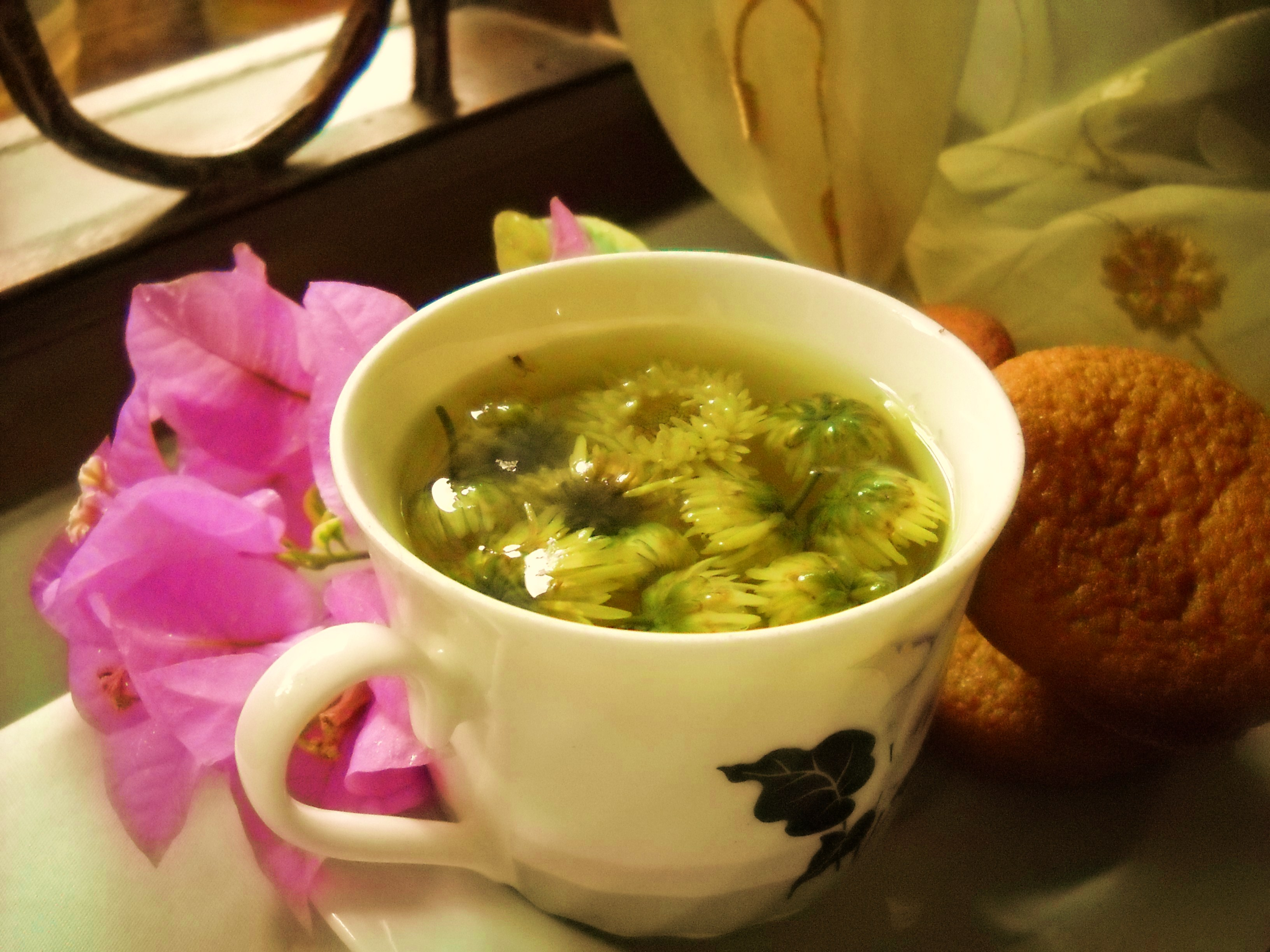
Chrysanthemum tea

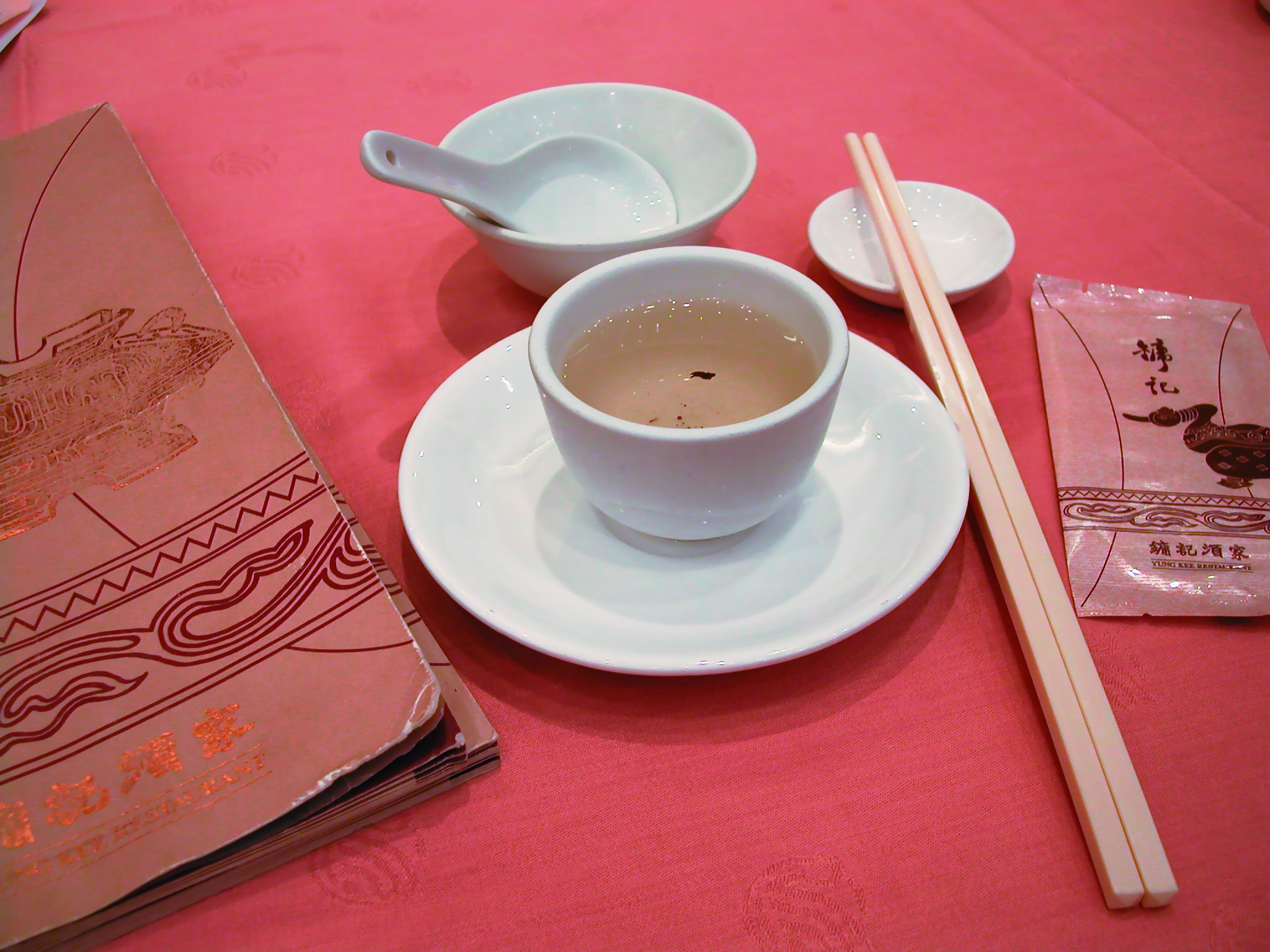
A typical dining set for "yum cha"

Tea is considered to be very important, so much so that it is considered just as important as the food itself. Teas served during dim sum include:

- Chrysanthemum tea: instead of tea leaves, it is a flower-based tisane (herbal tea) made from flowers of the species Chrysanthemum morifolium or Chrysanthemum indicum, which are the most popular in East Asia. To prepare the tea, chrysanthemum flowers (usually dried) are steeped in hot water (usually 90 to 95 °C (194 to 203 °F) after cooling from a boil) in a teapot, cup, or glass. A common mix with pu-erh is called guk pou (菊普; guk1 pou2) from its component teas.
- Green tea: freshly picked leaves that go through heating and drying processes but not oxidation, so keep their original green color and chemical compounds, like polyphenols and chlorophyll. Produced all over China, and the most popular category of tea, green teas include the representative Dragon Well (龍井; lung4 zeng2) and Biluochun from Zhejiang and Jiangsu provinces, respectively.
- Oolong tea: partially oxidizing the tea leaves imparts them with characteristics of both green and black teas. Oolong teas are closer in taste to green than black tea, yet have less of a "grassy" taste. Major oolong-tea producing areas such as Fujian, Guangdong, and Taiwan line the southeastern coast of China. Tieguanyin or Ti Kuan Yin (鐵觀音; tit3 gun1 jam1): one of the most popular, originated in Fujian province, and is a premium variety with a delightful fragrance.
- Pounei (Cantonese) or pu-erh tea (Mandarin): usually a compressed tea, pu-erh has unique, earthy notes derived from years of fermentation.
- Scented teas: various mixes of flowers with green, black, or oolong teas exist. Flowers used include jasmine, gardenia, magnolia, grapefruit flower, sweet-scented osmanthus, and rose. Strict rules govern the proportion of flowers to tea. Jasmine tea, the most popular scented tea, is the one most often served at yum cha establishments.

The tea service includes several customs. Typically, the server starts by asking diners which tea to serve. According to etiquette, the person closest to the teapot pours tea for the others. Sometimes, a younger person will serve an older person.

Those receiving tea express thanks by tapping their index and middle fingers twice on the table. According to one legend, the finger-tapping tradition evolved from an incident when an emperor poured tea for his servant in a public teahouse during a trip where the emperor concealed his identity to mingle with the commoners. Having been instructed by the emperor not to expose his identity to the public, the servant showed gratitude by improvising the finger-tapping gesture instead of what should have been a kowtow, which would have betrayed the emperor's noble status. The practice gradually evolved to represent gratitude for having tea poured by others.

Diners also flip open the lid (of hinged metal tea pots) or offset the tea pot cover (on ceramic tea pots) to signal an empty pot; servers will then refill the pot.

== History ==
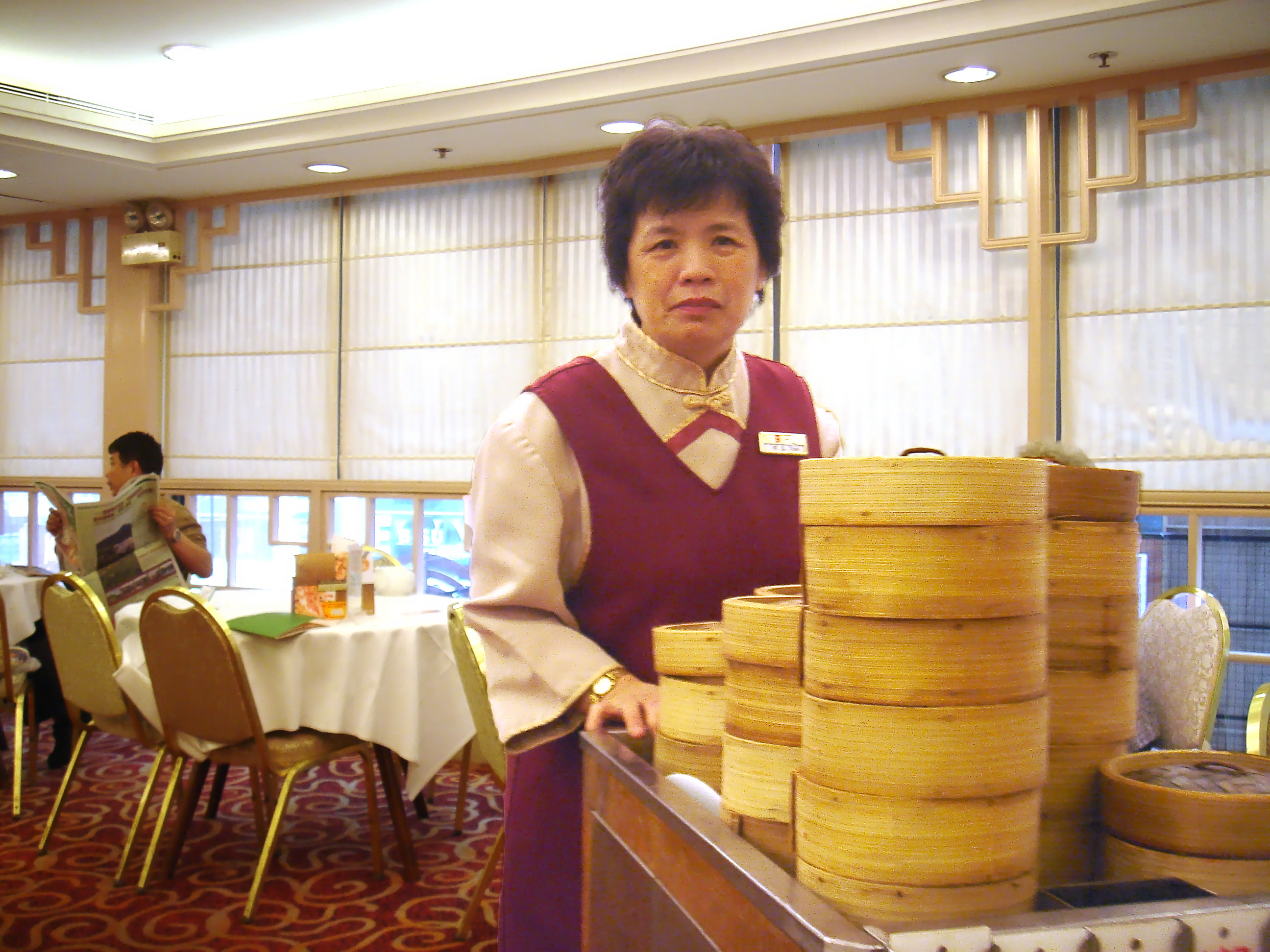
A dim sum restaurant in Hong Kong

A video guide to dim sum

Dim sum is part of the Chinese tradition of snacks originating from the Song dynasty (960–1279), when royal chefs created various dishes such as minced pheasant, lark tongue, and desserts made from steamed milk and bean paste. Guangzhou experienced an increase in commercial travel in the tenth century At that time, travelers would frequent teahouses for small-portion meals with tea called yum cha or "tea" meals. Yum cha includes two related concepts. The first, 一盅兩件, translates literally as "one cup, two pieces". This refers to the custom of serving teahouse customers two delicately made food items, savory or sweet, to complement their tea. The second, 點心, which means dim sum, translates literally to "touch the heart" (i.e., heart touching). This is the term used to designate the small food items that accompanied the drinking of tea.

During the thirteenth century, when the Mongols invaded China, the royal court fled to southern China, bringing a royal influence to the dim sum of Guangzhou. Guangzhou was a wealthy, large port city that had international visitors, a temperate climate, and a coastline where fresh and tropical ingredients were grown, resulting in an ideal environment for food and entertainment. In Guangzhou, street vendors and teahouses sold dim sum. The practice of having tea with dim sum at tea houses eventually evolved into modern yum cha. While at the teahouses, travelers selected their preferred snacks from carts. Visitors to tea houses often socialized as they ate, and business people negotiated deals over dim sum.

During the Ming dynasty (1368–1644), the Tea and Horses Bureau was established to monitor tea production and improve tea quality. The improvements in tea quality also led to teahouse improvements.

Cantonese dim sum culture developed rapidly during the latter half of the nineteenth century in Guangzhou. Teahouse dining areas were typically located upstairs, and initial dim sum fare included steamed buns. Eventually, these evolved into specialized dim sum restaurants, and the variety and quality of dim sum dishes rapidly followed suit. Cantonese dim sum was originally based on local foods such as sweet roast pork called char siu and fresh rice noodles. As dim sum continued to develop, chefs introduced influences and traditions from other regions of China, which created a starting point for the wide variety of dim sum available today. Chefs created a large range of dim sum that even today comprises most of a teahouse's dim sum offerings. Part of this development included reducing portion sizes of larger dishes originally from northern China, such as stuffed steamed buns, so they could easily be incorporated into the dim sum menu. The rapid growth in dim sum restaurants was partly because people found the preparation of dim sum dishes to be time-consuming and preferred the convenience of dining out and eating a large variety of baked, steamed, pan-fried, deep-fried, and braised foods. Dim sum continued to develop and also spread southward to Hong Kong.

Although dim sum is normally considered Cantonese, it includes many additional influences. Over thousands of years, as people in China migrated in search of different places to live, they carried the recipes of their favorite foods and continued to prepare and serve these dishes. Many Han Chinese migrated south, seeking warmer climates. Settlements took shape in the Yangtze River Valley, the central highlands, and the coastal southeast, including Guangdong. The influence of Suzhou and Hangzhou is found in vegetarian soy skin rolls and pearl meatballs. The dessert squares flavored with red dates or wolfberries are influenced by Beijing desserts. Savory dishes, such as pot stickers and steamed dumplings, include Muslim influences because of people traveling from Central Asia across the Silk Road and into Guangdong. These are just a few examples of how a wide range of influences became incorporated into traditional Cantonese dim sum.

By 1860, foreign influences had shaped Guangdong's dim sum with culinary innovations such as ketchup, Worcestershire sauce, and curry, all of which came to be used in some savory dishes. Custard pies evolved into the miniature classics found in every teahouse. Other dim sum dishes evolved from Indian samosas, mango puddings, and Mexican conchas (snow-topped buns). Cantonese-style dim sum has an extremely broad range of tastes, textures, cooking styles, and ingredients. As a result, there are more than a thousand different varieties of dim sum.

During the 1920s, in Guangzhou, the foremost places to enjoy tea were its tea pavilions, which had refined and expansive surroundings. The customers were wealthy, and there were rather high standards for the privilege of enjoying tea pavilion service and dim sum. Upon entering a tea pavilion, customers would inspect tea leaves to ensure their quality and to verify the water temperature. Once satisfied, these guests were presented with a pencil and a booklet listing the available dim sum. A waiter would then tear their orders out of the booklet so that the kitchen could pan-fry, steam, bake, or deep-fry these dishes on demand. Customers dined upstairs in privacy and comfort. Servers carefully balanced the dishes on their arms or arranged them on trays as they climbed up and down the stairs. Eventually, dim sum carts were used to serve the steamers and plates.

People with average incomes also enjoyed tea and dim sum. Early every morning, customers visited inexpensive restaurants that offered filled steamed buns and hot tea. During the mid-morning, students and government employees ordered two or three kinds of dim sum and ate as they read their newspapers. In the late morning, people working at small businesses visited restaurants for breakfast and to use the restaurant as a small office space.

By the late 1930s, Guangzhou's teahouse culture included four high-profile dim sum chefs, with signs at the front doors of their restaurants. There was heavy competition among teahouses, and as a result, new varieties of dim sum were invented almost daily, including dishes influenced by the tea pastries of Shanghai, Beijing, and the Western world. Many new fusion dishes were also created, including puddings, baked rolls, turnovers, custard tarts, and Malay steamed cakes.

There were also significant increases in the variety of thin wrappers used in both sweet and savory items.

If we concentrate only on the changes and developments in the variety of wrappers, the main types of dim sum wrappers during the 1920s included such things as raised (for filled buns), wheat starch, shao mai (i.e., egg dough), crystal bun, crispy batter, sticky rice, and boiled dumpling wrappers. By the 1930s, the varieties of wrappers commonly used by chefs included puff pastry, Cantonese short pastry, and so on, for a total of 23 types that were prepared by pan-frying, deep-frying, steaming, baking, and roasting.

As the Chinese Civil War progressed from 1927 to 1949, many dim sum chefs left China and settled in Hong Kong, resulting in further refinements and innovations of the dim sum there. Very large dim sum restaurants in major cities like Hong Kong, San Francisco, Boston, Toronto, and New York were also established.

In the nineteenth century, Cantonese immigrants brought dim sum to the west and east coasts of the United States. Some of the earliest dim sum restaurants in the U.S. still operating today opened in the 1920s in San Francisco and New York City. The history of San Francisco's Chinese community is believed to have started about 30 years before the first dim sum restaurant opened in the city's Chinatown neighborhood. The Chinese preferred to live in the present Chinatown area because of its restaurants and theaters. In the late 1930s, some early U.S. newspaper references to dim sum began to appear. While some Chinese restaurants in the U.S. had offered dim sum for decades, it was not until the late 1980s that there was a broader public awareness of dim sum.

Although there was increased awareness of dim sum around this time, one chef from Hong Kong, who immigrated to San Francisco, noted that diners in the U.S. usually focused on the food itself and not the communal aspects of eating dim sum. Although dim sum is a Chinese meal, it is a communal dining and social experience that can span hours. It is customary for large groups to enjoy dishes together as a leisurely social activity. Diners go to restaurants early, around 10:00 AM, and rather than ordering a whole table of food, they order small amounts, have a cup of tea, read the newspaper, and wait for friends and family to join them. As a result, a visit to a dim sum restaurant can last from late morning well into the afternoon. For some people in Hong Kong, eating dim sum is a daily routine and a way of life. Since this dim sum tradition is not always present in some U.S. dim sum restaurants, however, approaches to generate interest and attract customers include customized seasoning and flavors of traditional dishes, as well as creating novel dishes with an emphasis on enhanced flavors and visual appeal.

One food reviewer notes that there has been an increase in popularity in posting dim sum photos on social media feeds, and that dim sum has become so popular that every U.S. state now has at least one high-quality dim sum restaurant.

The dim sum restaurants in Chicago's Chinatown serve mainly traditional dim sum dishes, but there has been recent growth in contemporary dim sum with new fusion dishes, as well as restaurants now located outside Chinatown.

In Hong Kong, many chefs are also introducing variants based on traditional Cantonese cuisine, which generates interest and provides both Hongkongers and tourists with new, fresh dim sum dishes.

== Modern dim sum ==
In addition to traditional dim sum, some chefs also create and prepare new fusion-based dim sum dishes. Modern versions of buns include pork belly steamed buns with cucumber, green onion, cilantro, and ginger hoisin sauce, cocoa mushroom buns, and chili lamb buns. Dumplings include snow pea shoot and shrimp dumplings, and chili crab with fried garlic, siu mai with pork, shrimp, scallop, and caviar, dumplings stuffed with shrimp and peanut, dumplings with South Australian scallop, garoupa (grouper), caviar, gold leaf, and egg white, and bone marrow or beef short ribs in potstickers. Pastry puff dishes include Australian Wagyu beef puff, Assam curry chicken puff, and pumpkin puffs. Toast dishes include Hong Kong–style French toast with condensed milk and peanut butter and prawn toast. Additional examples are spring rolls filled with goat and duck skin and duck hearts cooked over a wood-fired grill and served with sesame-horseradish sauce.

One AAA four-diamond-award-winning Chinese restaurant in Miami Beach has a prix-fixe dim sum menu, prix-fixe yum cha menu and breakfast cocktails. Variations designed for visual appeal on social media, such as dumplings and buns made to resemble animals and fictional characters, also exist. Dim sum chefs have previously used cocoa powder as coloring to create steamed bread puffs to appear like forest mushrooms, espresso powder as both flavoring and coloring for deep-fried riblets, as well as pastry cream, and French puffs to create innovative dishes while paying tribute to the history of dim sum.

Dim sum has transitioned to become a global culinary staple. According to Britannica, dim sum restaurants exist worldwide. Modernly, many new establishments serve dim sum via order cards or computer systems rather than the traditional steam cart. In immigrant communities across North America, dim sum is adapted to local palates and dining. There are even fusion dim sum dishes now.

== Modern service styles ==
Traditionally, dim sum was served from rolling carts pushed through dining rooms, allowing customers to select dishes visually as servers circulated among tables. This style remains common in many Cantonese restaurants, particularly during daytime service hours associated with yum cha. However, many modern establishments have shifted toward menu-based ordering systems, in which dishes are prepared to order rather than selected from carts. This change has been attributed to factors including labor costs, efficiency, and a desire to ensure consistent food quality and temperature.

In contemporary urban centers such as Hong Kong and major international cities, dim sum service has also evolved to include upscale dining formats, extended evening hours, and fusion interpretations that incorporate nontraditional ingredients or presentation styles. Despite these changes, the communal nature of sharing multiple small dishes alongside tea remains a defining characteristic of the cuisine.

=== Fast food ===
Dim sum can often be purchased from grocery stores in major cities. They can be cooked easily by steaming, frying, or microwaving. Major grocery stores in Hong Kong, Vietnam, the Philippines, Singapore, Taiwan, China, Indonesia, Malaysia, Brunei, Thailand, Australia, the United States and Canada stock a variety of frozen or fresh dim sum. These include dumplings, shumai, pork buns, and others.

In Hong Kong and other cities in Asia, dim sum can be purchased from convenience stores, coffee shops and other eateries. Halal-certified dim sum that uses chicken instead of pork is very popular in Hong Kong, Malaysia, Indonesia and Brunei.

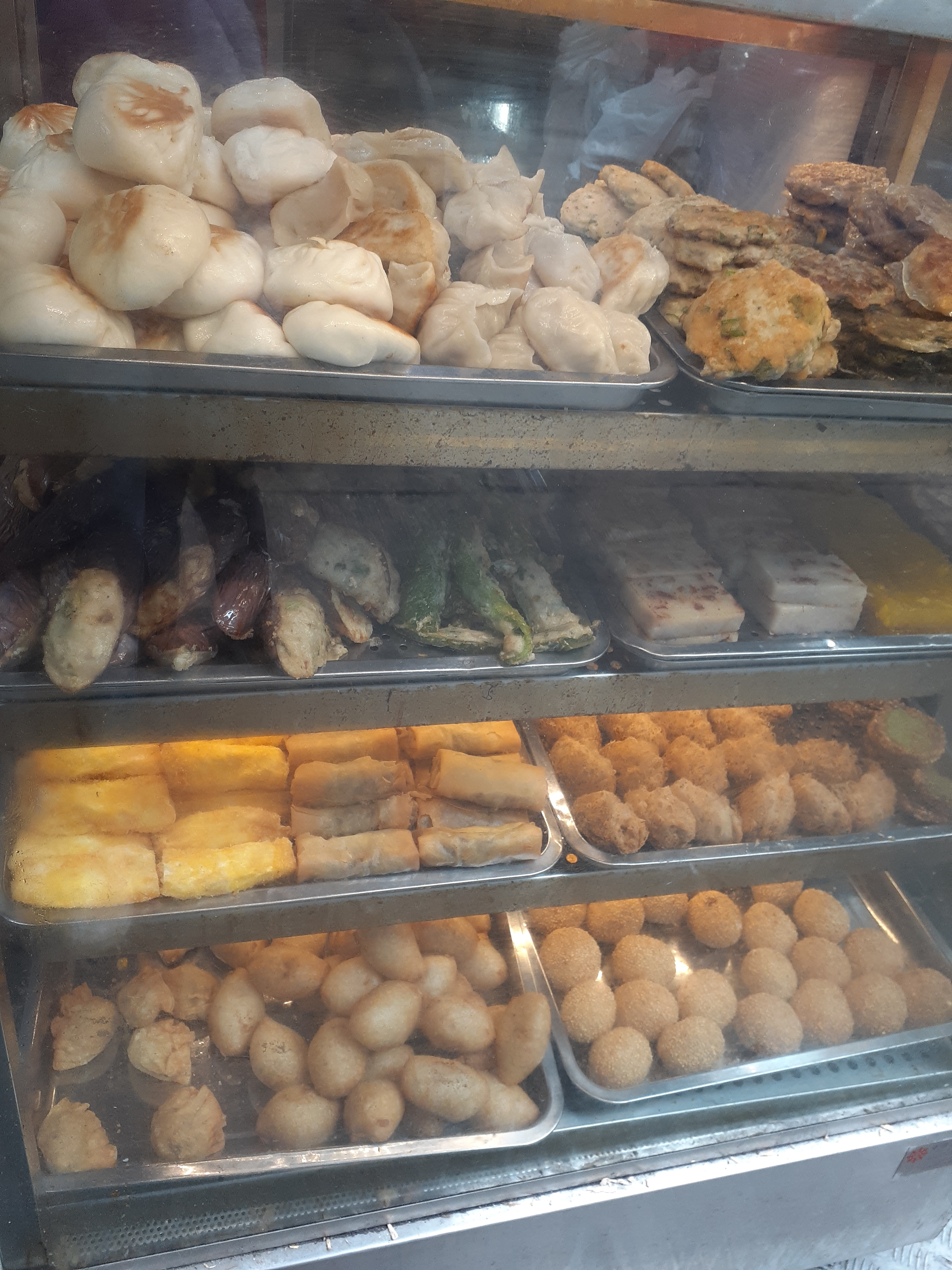
Streetside dim sum food shop in Hong Kong

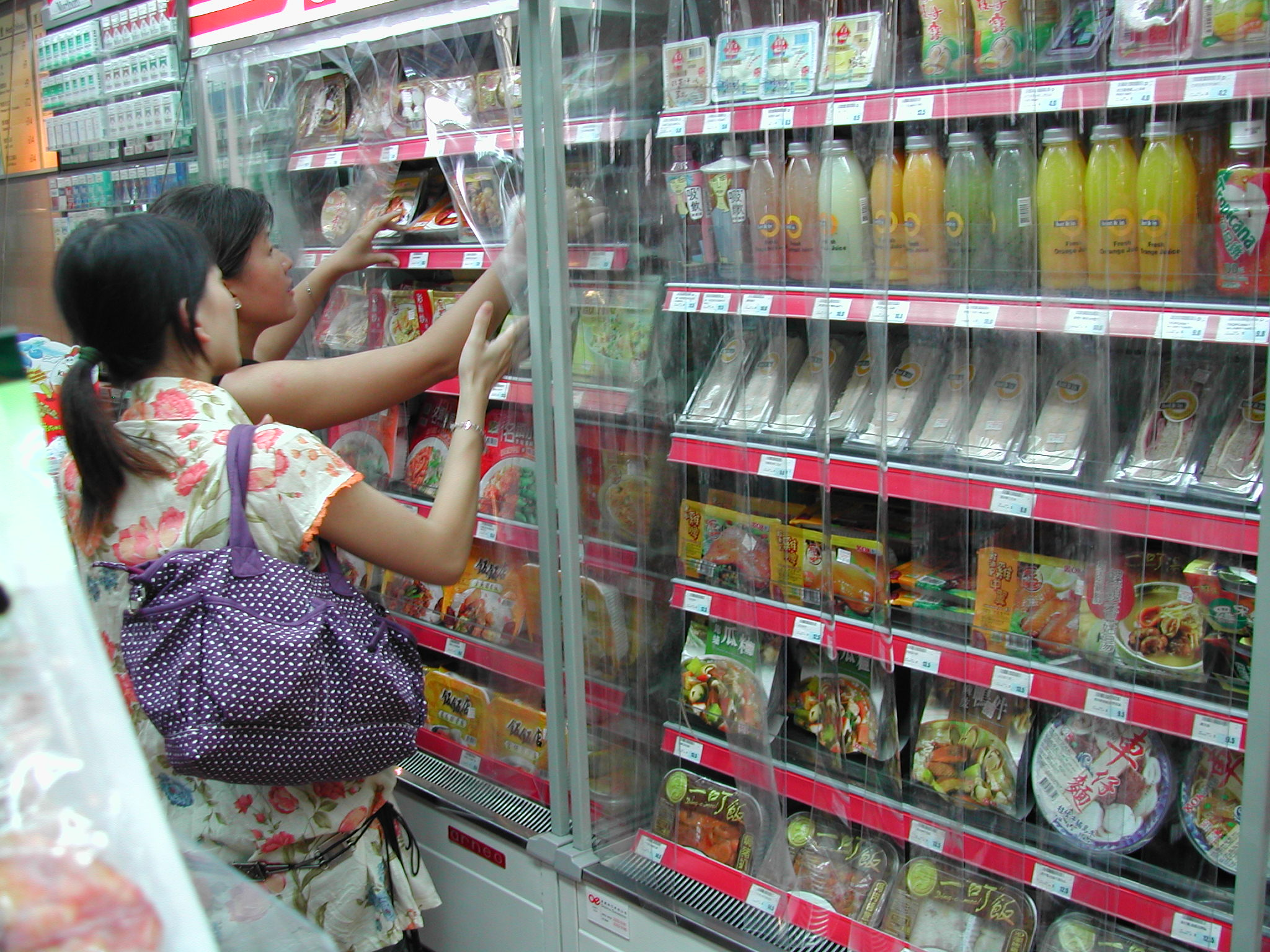
Frozen dim sum are widely available at convenience stores

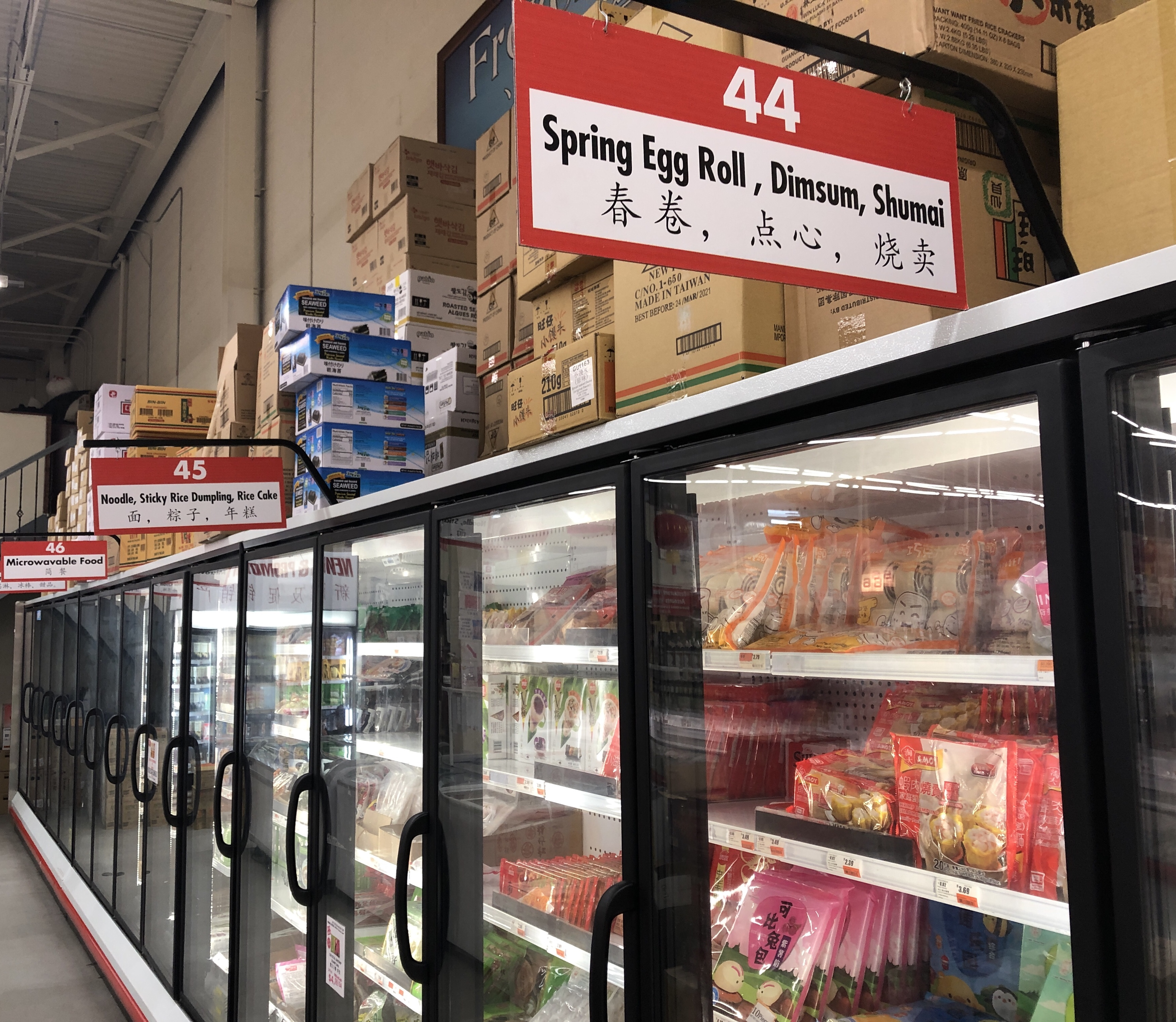
Frozen dim sum in a grocery store in the United States

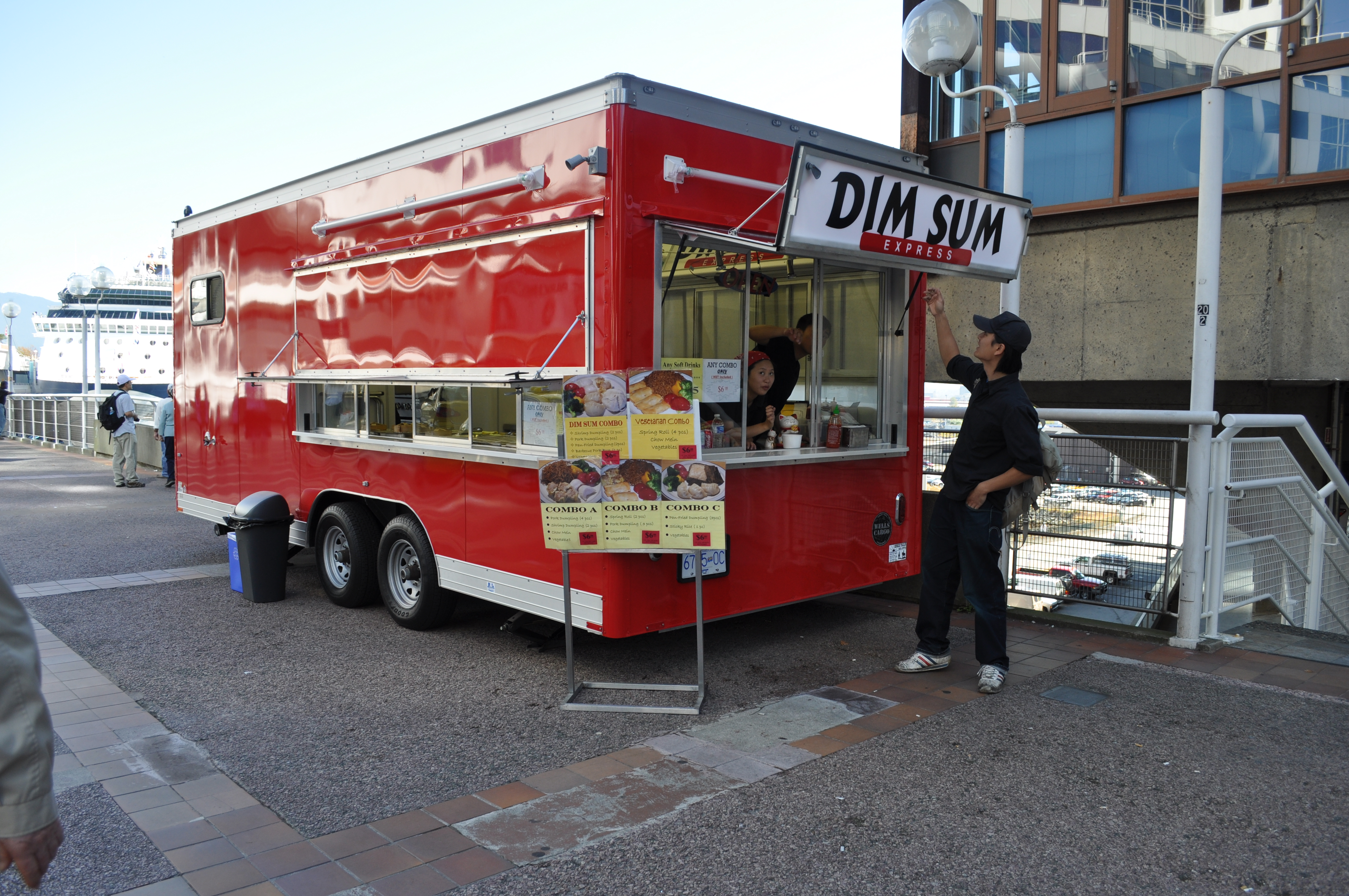
Express Dim Sum food truck, Canada Place, Vancouver, British Columbia.

=== Restaurants ===
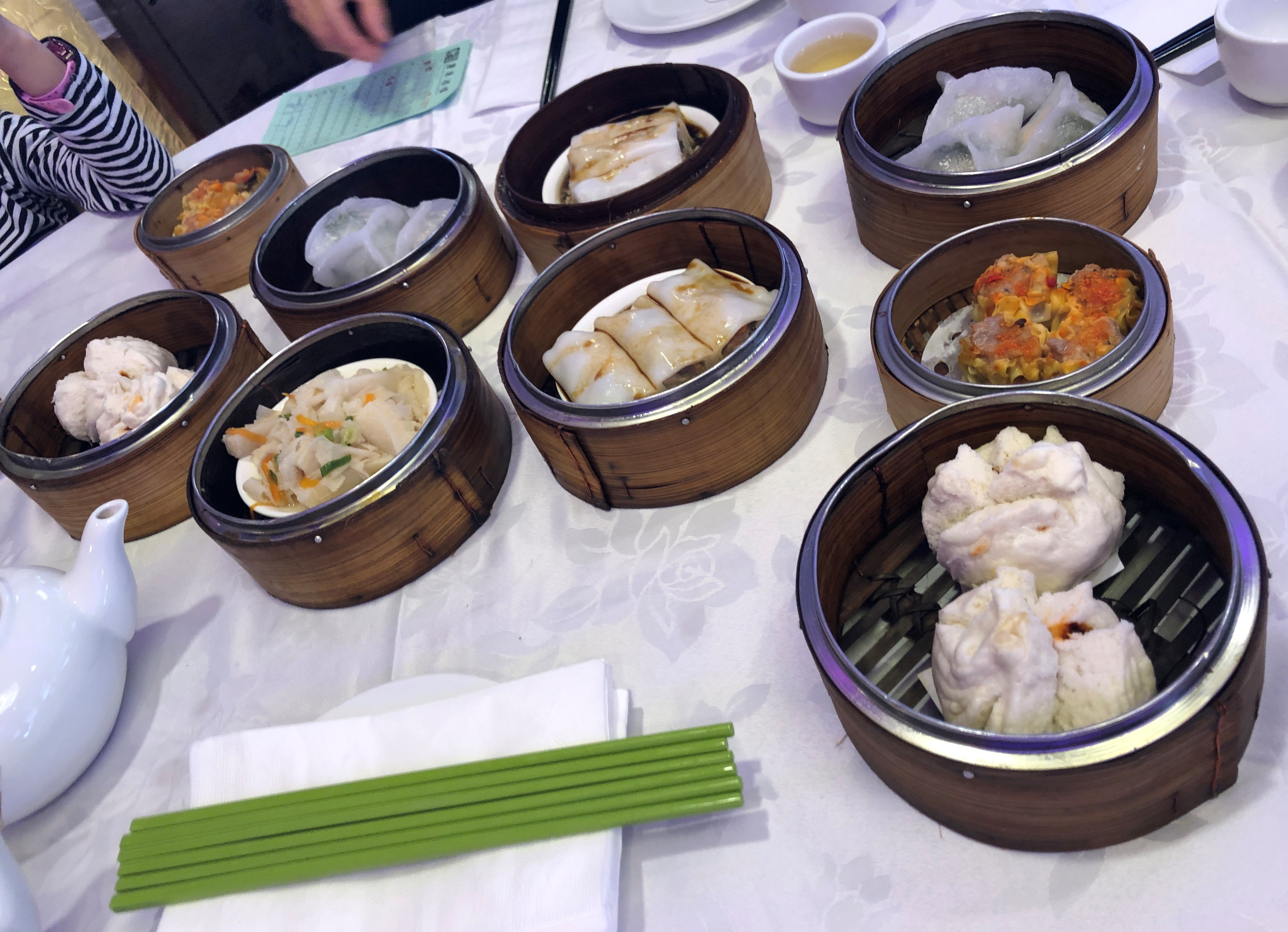
A light blue bill card (upper left) on a table of traditional family-style dim sum lunch dishes in a restaurant

Some Cantonese restaurants serve dim sum as early as five in the morning, while more traditional restaurants typically serve dim sum from mid-morning until mid-afternoon. It is common for restaurants to serve dim sum during dinner as well as for takeout.

Dim sum is served using a unique serving method whereby servers offer dishes to customers from carts, including some carts that are steam-heated. Diners often prefer tables nearest the kitchen since servers and carts pass by these tables first. Many restaurants place lazy susans on tables to help diners reach food and tea.

The pricing of dishes at these types of restaurants may vary, but traditionally they are classified as "small", "medium", "large", "extra-large", or "special". Servers record orders with a rubber stamp or an ink pen on a bill card that remains on the table. Servers in some restaurants use distinctive stamps to track sales statistics for each server. When they have finished eating, the customer calls the server over, and their bill is calculated based on the number of stamps or quantities marked in each priced section.

Another way of pricing the food that was consumed uses the number and color of the dishes left on the table. Some restaurants offer a new approach by using a conveyor belt format.

Other Cantonese restaurants may take orders from a pre-printed sheet of paper and serve à la carte, much like Spanish tapas restaurants, to provide fresh, cooked-to-order dim sum or because of real estate and resource constraints.

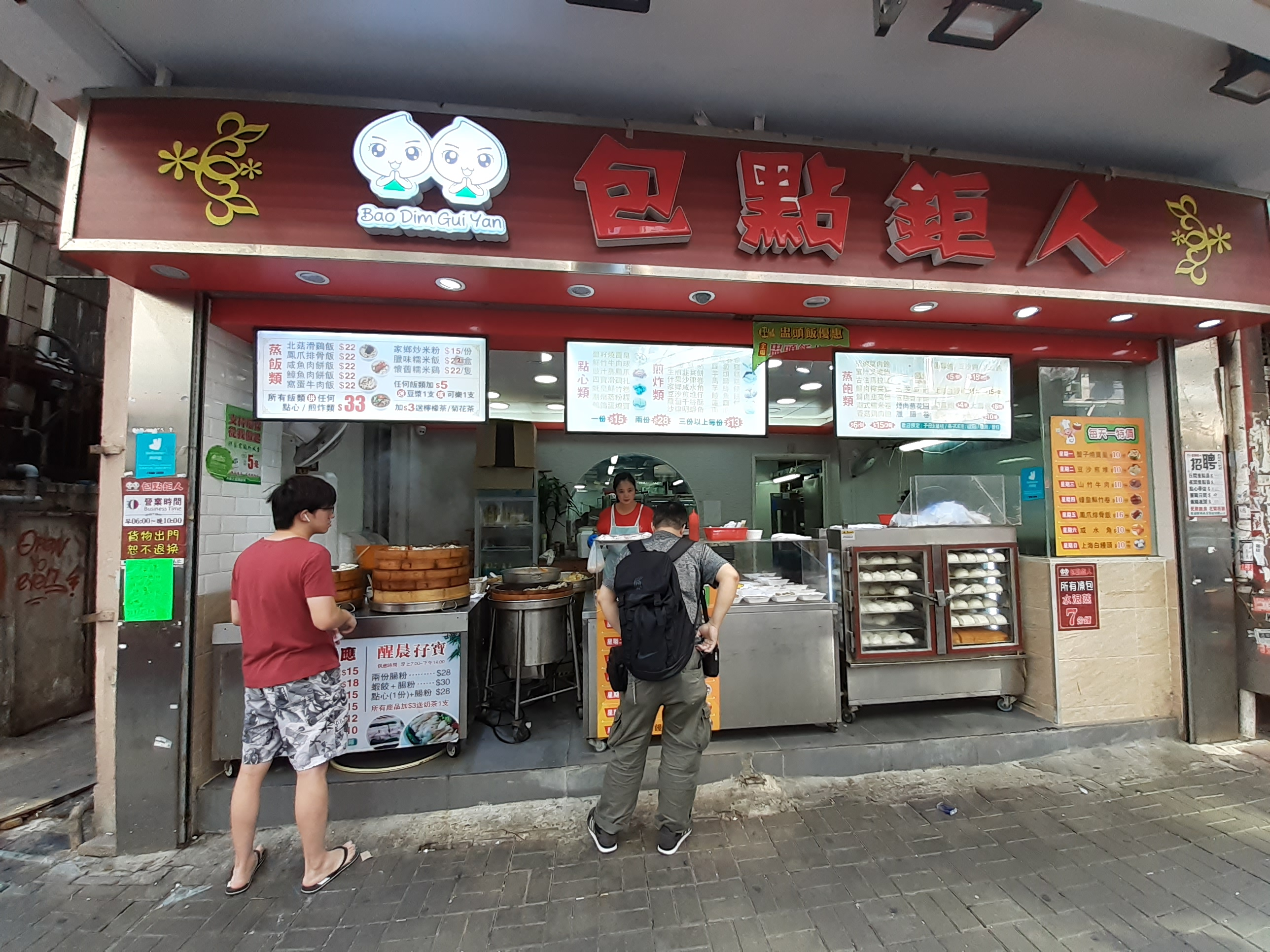
Dim sum food shop in Hong Kong

== See also ==
- Bamboo steamer
- Cantonese cuisine
- Chinese cuisine
- Dim sim, Australian dumpling inspired by dim sum, with origins in local Cantonese restaurants.
- Hong Kong cuisine
- List of brunch foods
- List of dumplings

== Sources ==
- Phillips, Carolyn (2006) The Dim Sum Field Guide: A Taxonomy of Dumplings, Buns, Meats, Sweets, and Other Specialties of the Chinese Teahouse. New York: Crown Publishing Group ISBN 9781607749578
- Chén Zōngmào [陳宗懋] (1991). Zhōngguó chájīng 中國茶經 [Chinese Tea] (in Chinese). Shanghai Culture Press [上海文化出版社]. ISBN 978-7-80511-499-6.
