= Pearl meatballs =

Type of traditional Chinese meatball

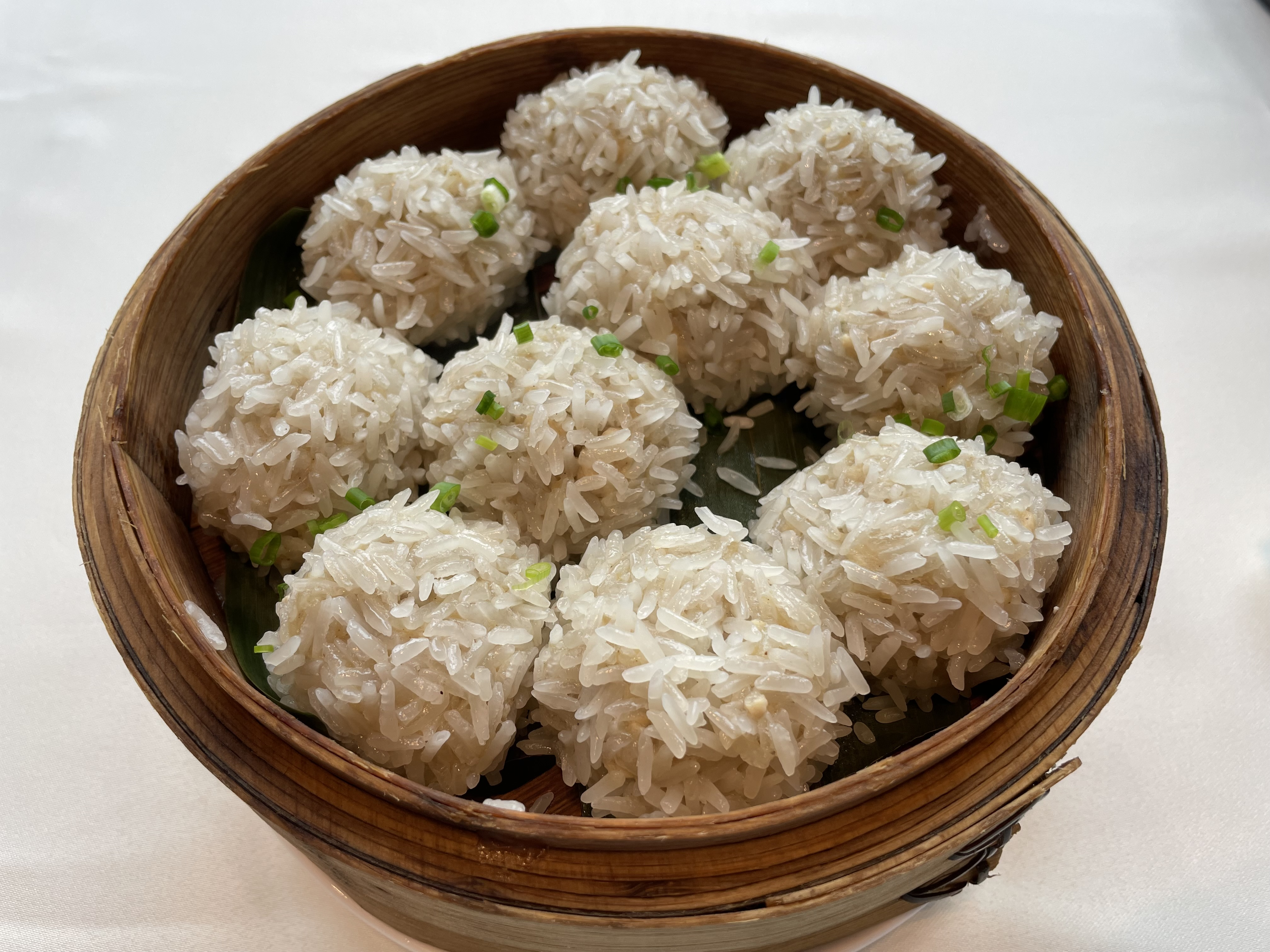
- Pearl meatballs in a bamboo steamer
- Course: Dim sum
- Place of origin: China
- Region or state: Hubei, Hunan
- Main ingredients: Ground pork, glutinous rice, vegetables, starch

Pearl meatballs
- Traditional Chinese: 珍珠丸子
- Simplified Chinese: 珍珠丸子
- Literal meaning: pearl ball
Transcriptions
Standard Mandarin
- Hanyu Pinyin: zhēnzhū wánzi

Pearl meatballs, also called pearl balls (Chinese: 珍珠丸子; pinyin: zhēnzhū wánzi) or glutinous rice balls (Chinese: 糯米丸子; pinyin: nuòmǐ wánzi), are traditional Chinese meatballs from Hubei and Hunan. They are usually made of ground pork and vegetables, then covered in glutinous rice and steamed.

Historically, pearl meatballs were eaten on festive occasions like birthdays or Chinese New Year, but is now served casually, such as in dim sum. Pearl balls are a part of Mianyang Sanzheng ("The Three Steamed Dishes of Mianyang"), a famous dish in Hubei cuisine.

== Preparation ==
Pearl meatballs are made with ground pork, mixed with sesame oil, Shaoxing wine, pepper, diced vegetables, and starch or egg white for thickening. The most commonly used vegetables include ginger, water chestnut, scallions, bamboo shoots, mushrooms, and lotus root.

The meat mixture is formed into balls, then rolled and coated in glutinous rice, which is soaked beforehand but not cooked. The balls are then steamed and served in bamboo steamers.

== Gallery ==
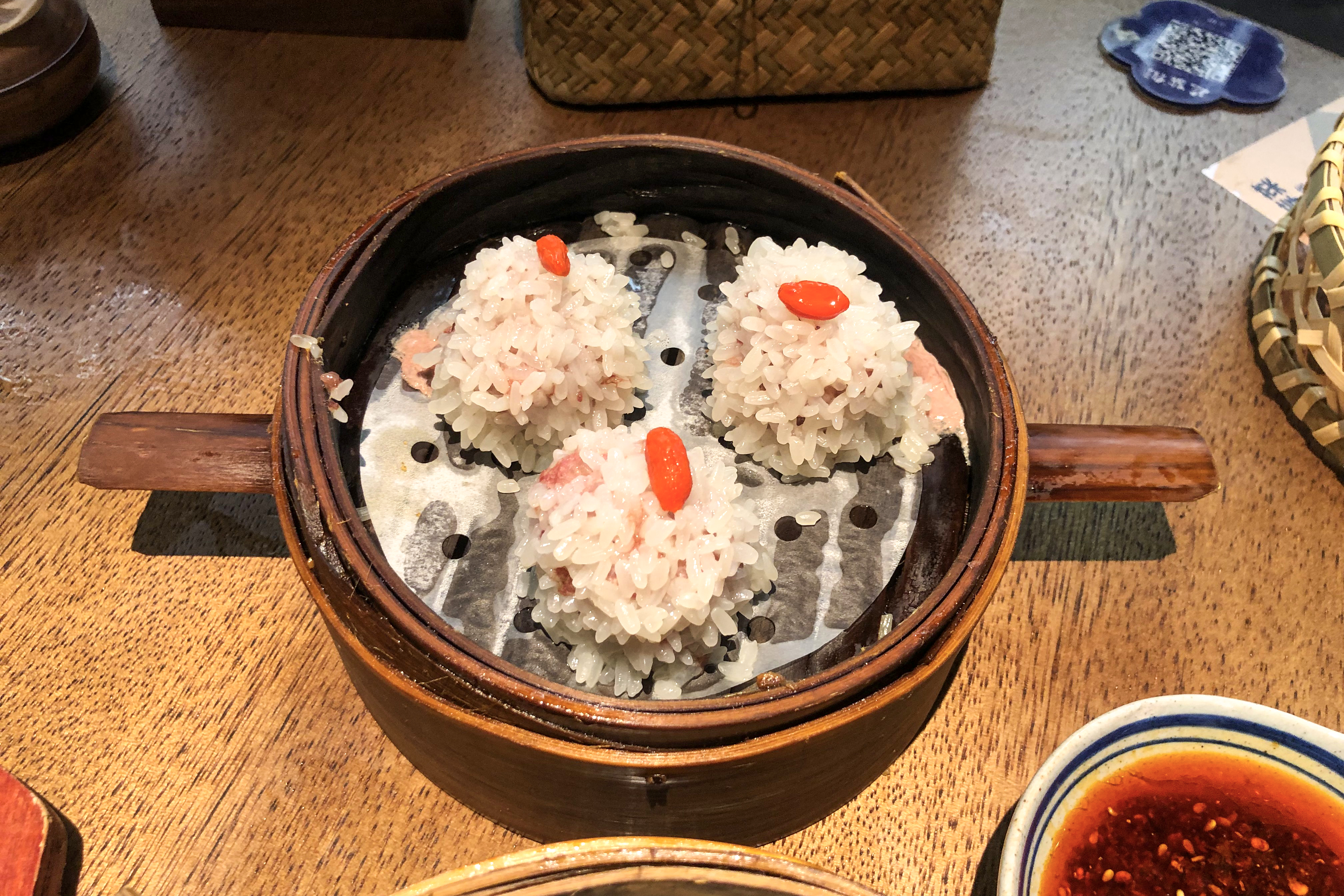

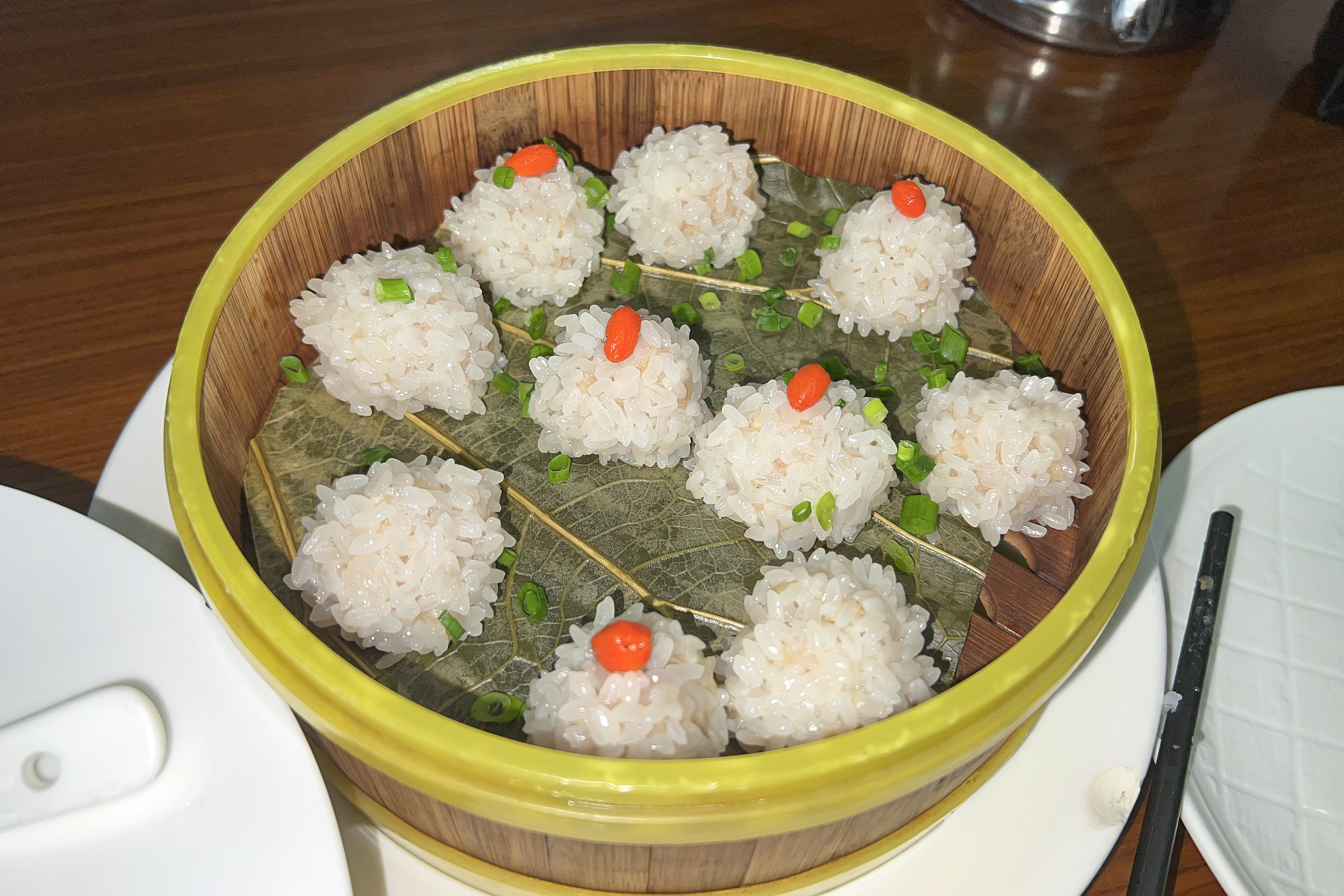

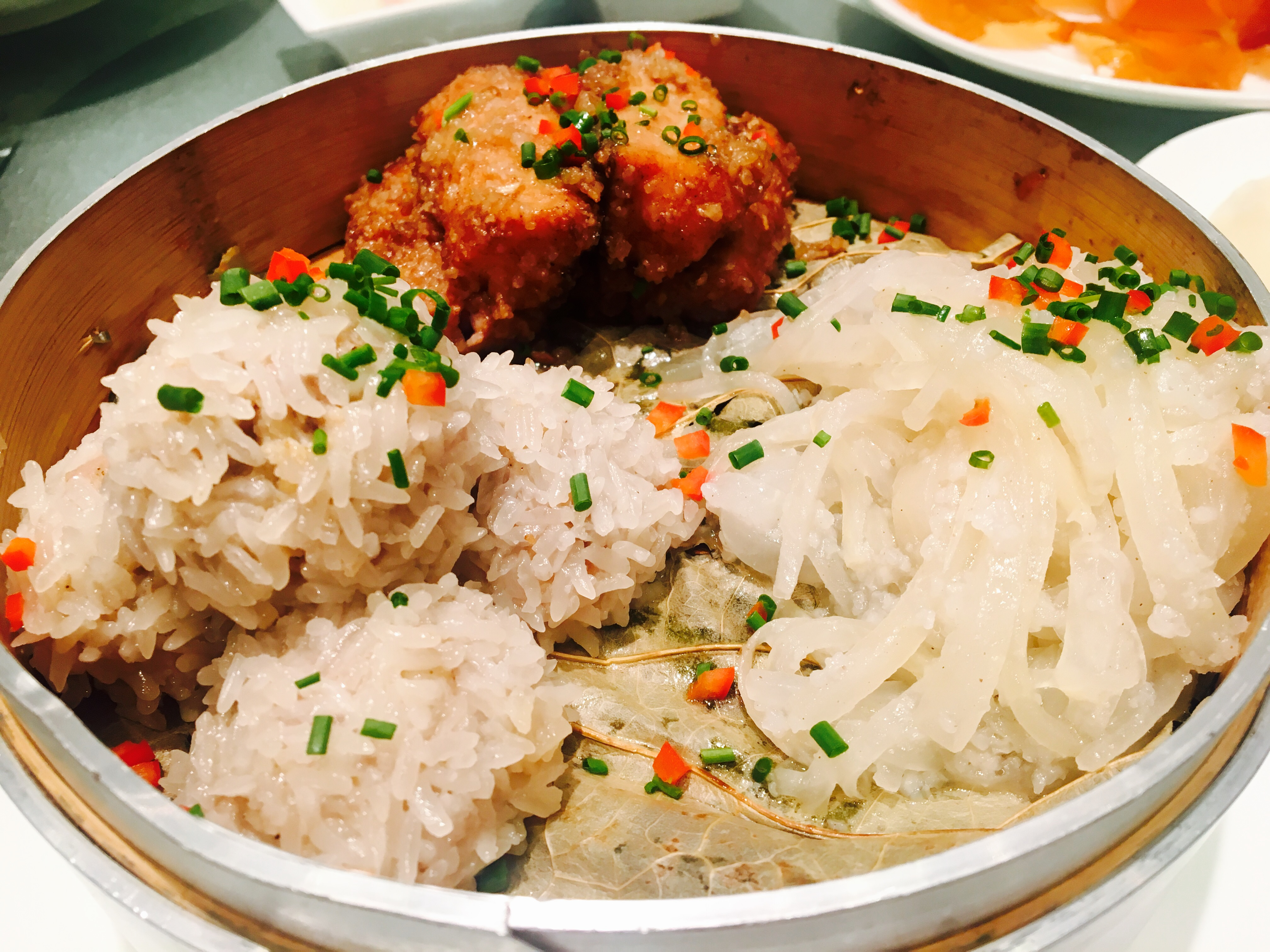
Mianyang Sanzheng, a specialty in Hubei cuisine that contains pearl meatballs

== See also ==
- Dim sum
- Lion's head
- Steamed meatball
- Meatball
