= Lion's Head (food) =

Chinese stewed meatball dish

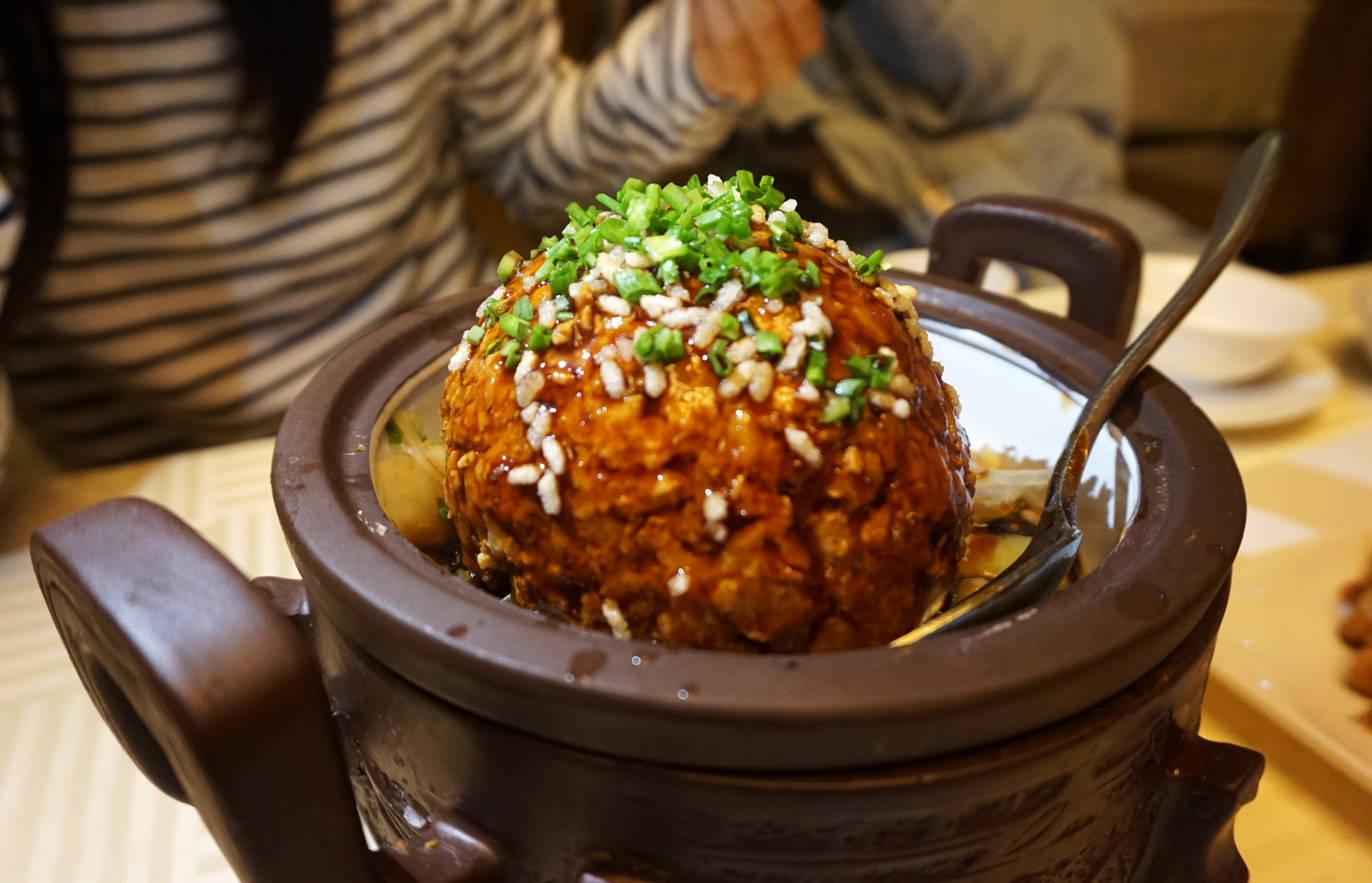
- Traditional Chinese: 獅子頭
- Simplified Chinese: 狮子头
- Literal meaning: Lion's head
Transcriptions
Standard Mandarin
- Hanyu Pinyin: Shīzi Tóu

Lion's Head (Chinese: 獅子頭; pinyin: Shīzitóu) or stewed meatball is a dish from the Huaiyang cuisine of eastern China, consisting of large pork or beef meatballs stewed with vegetables. There are two varieties: white (or plain), and red (紅燒, cooked with soy sauce). The plain variety is usually stewed or steamed with napa cabbage. The red variety can be stewed with cabbage or cooked with bamboo shoots and tofu derivatives. The minced meat rich in fat is more likely to bring better texture, addition of chopped water chestnut also works.

The name "lion's head", derives from the shape of the meatball which is supposed to resemble the head of the Chinese guardian lion, specifically.

The dish originated in Yangzhou and Zhenjiang, to a lesser degree, Huai'an, while the plain variety is more common in Yangzhou and the red variety more common in Zhenjiang. The dish became a part of Shanghai cuisine with the influx of migrants in the 19th and 20th centuries.

The dish can also be prepared with beef or be made as a vegetarian dish.

== History ==
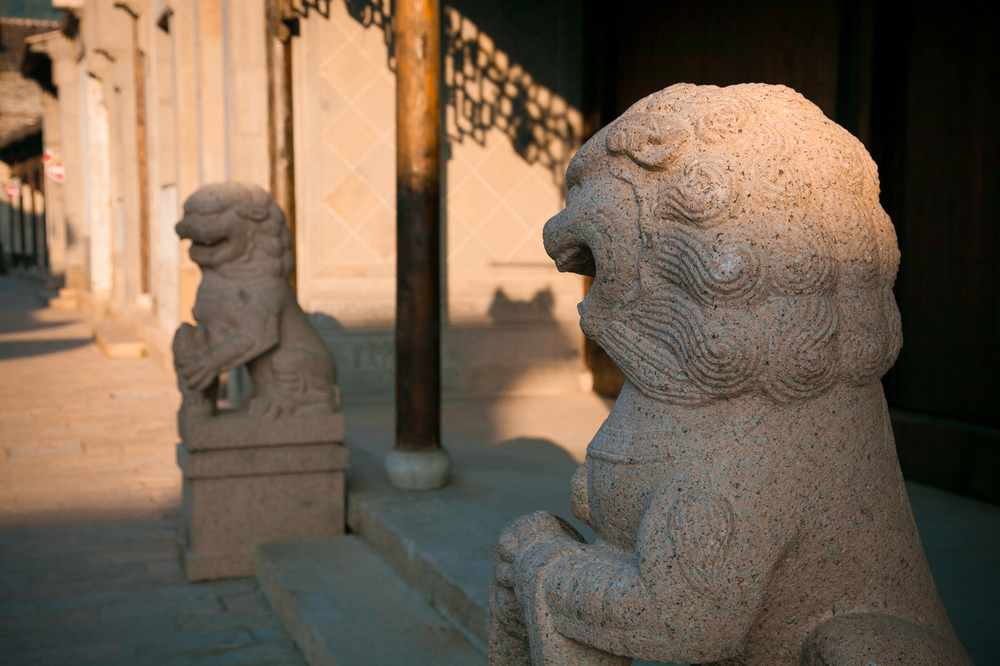
The shape of the meatball is supposed to resemble the head of Chinese guardian lions

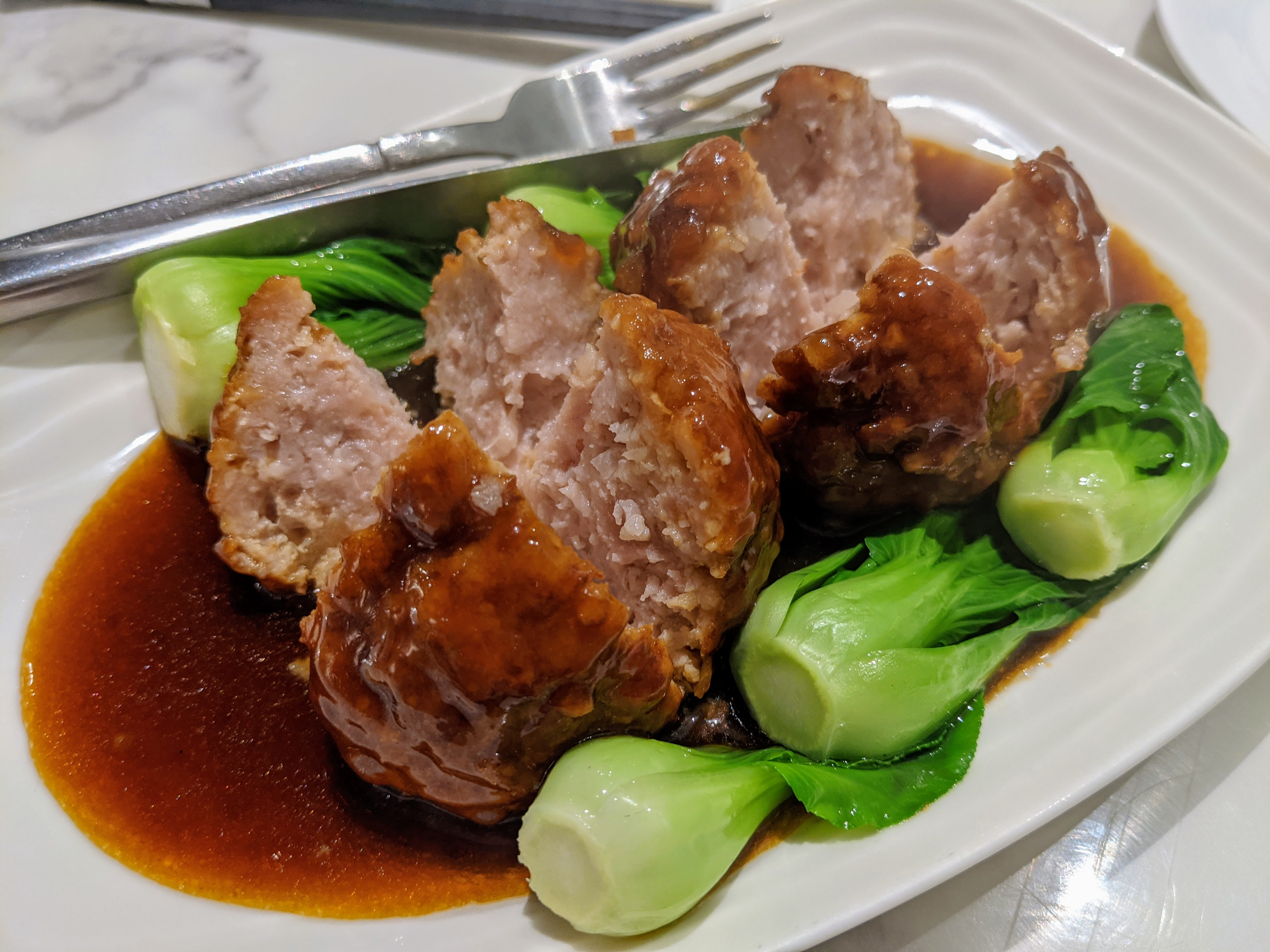
Lion's head meatballs in brown sauce, cut open

The dish has been well known since the Qing dynasty, as the recipe extracted from Xu Ke's Qing bai lei chao (清稗類鈔) attests:

獅子頭者，以形似而得名，豬肉圓也。豬肉肥瘦各半，細切粗斬，乃和以蛋白，使易凝固，或加蝦仁、蟹粉。以黃沙罐一，底置黃芽菜或竹筍，略和以水及鹽，以肉作極大之圓，置其上，上覆菜葉，以罐蓋蓋之，乃入鐵鍋，撒鹽少許，以防鍋裂，然後以文火乾燒之。每燒數柴把一停，約越五分時更燒之，候熟取出。 (Lion's head, is a pork meatball, its shape just as its name implies. The proportion of fat to lean pork is fifty-fifty, chop up them, then mix them with egg whites so that the mixture can coagulate easily. The shrimp meat or crab powder is an optional ingredient to mix. Put napa cabbage or bamboo shoots on the bottom of a clay pot, pour a little water and dissolve the salt in it. Make the meatballs as big as possible, put them in, then put leaves above the meatballs and put the lid on the pot. Place the pot in a wok filled with salt water, to avoid cracking in this way, cook over a gentle heat. stoke enough firewood at intervals, when the meat is medium, burn the wok fiercely until the meat is well done.)

Earlier, a salt merchant from Yangzhou called Tong Yuejian (童嶽薦) who lived in the mid-Qing recorded a dish, dadian rouyuan (大㓠肉圓), in his concise cookbook Tiaoding ji (調鼎集):

取肋條肉去皮切細長條粗㓠，加豆粉少許作料，用手松捺不可搓，或油炸，或蒸，襯用嫩青。

The significant resemblance between both dishes indicates that the latter may be the prototype of the former. It is said to date back to Sui dynasty in myth and folklore, but there is no evidence to support such a theory so far.

== Types ==
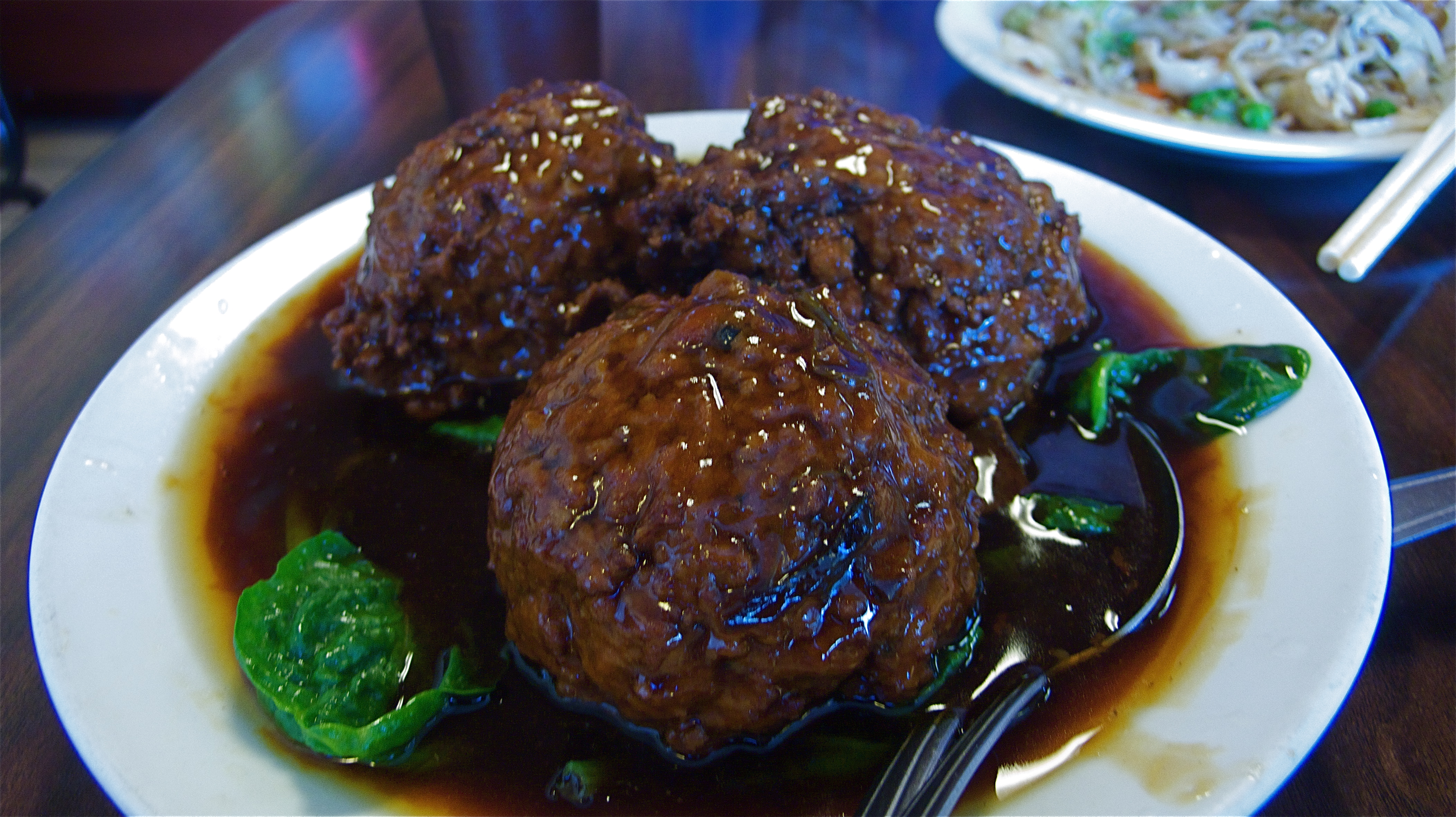
Red-cooked (soy-braised) lion's head meatballs

=== Stewed meatballs with crab powder ===
This type is deemed to be the traditional one, its ingredients and procedure changed a little from the dish mentioned above.

- Pork Ribs (proportion of fat and lean pork: 7:3)
- Crab Roe
- Crab Meat
- Napa Cabbage
- Shrimp
- Shaohsing Wine
- Salt
- Infusion of garlic and scallions
- Starch
- Pork Stock
- Lard

== In literature ==
- Liang Shih-chiu's essay, Lion's Head. Liang thought the dish is from Yangzhou cuisine, while its northern counterpart is Sixi wanzi, Braised Pork Balls in Gravy.
- Wang Zengqi's essay Roushizhe bubi (肉食者不鄙). Wang classified the dish as Huai'an cuisine. He wrote that Lion's head is "fluffy but not loose", and "that is the difference from Sixi wanzi". Besides, Wang mentioned that Zhou Enlai could cook this dish since he hailed from Huai'an.

== See also ==
- Pork ball
- Beef ball
- Steamed meatball
- Pearl meatballs
- Meatball
- Fish ball
- List of cabbage dishes
- List of pork dishes
