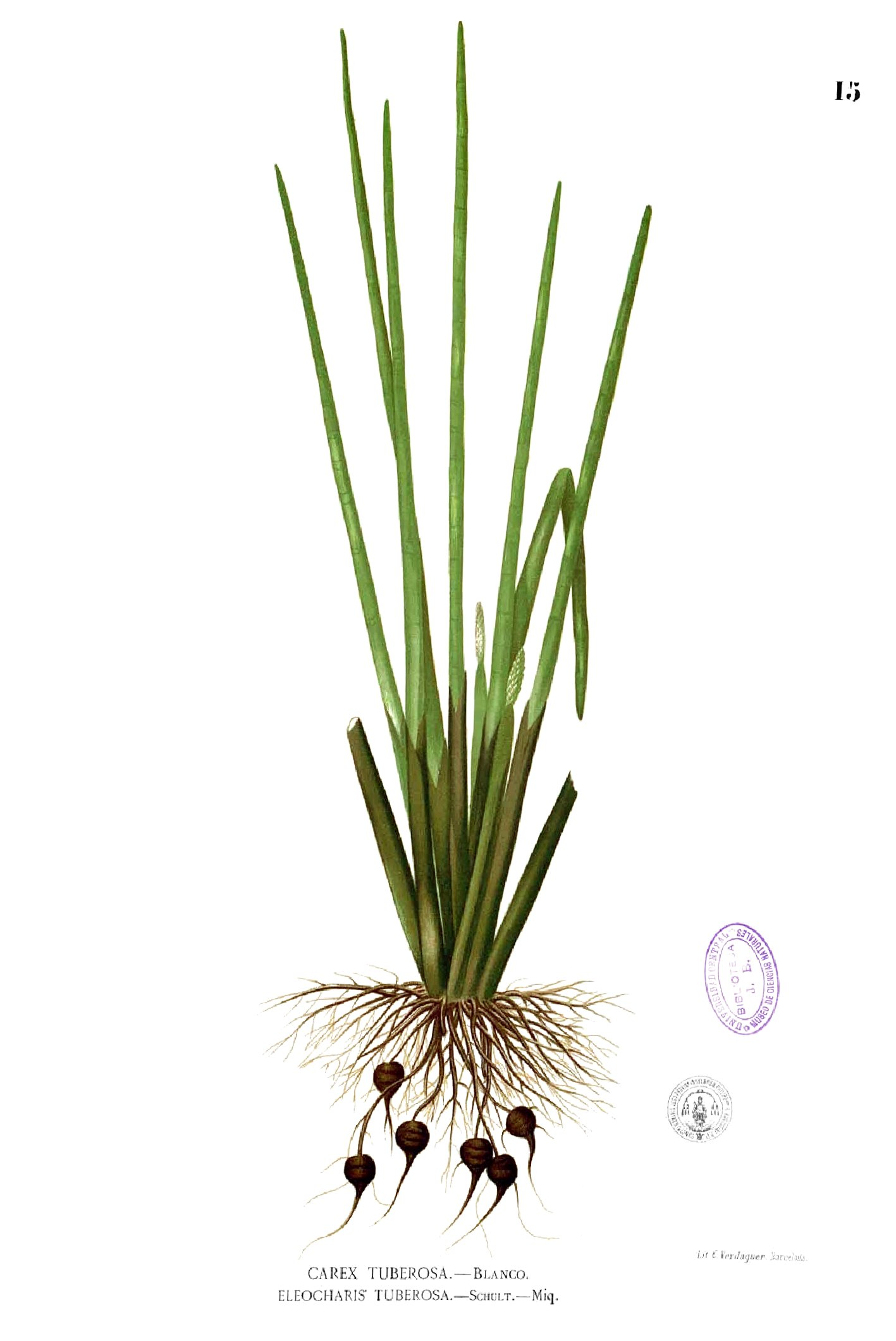
- Illustration c. 1880
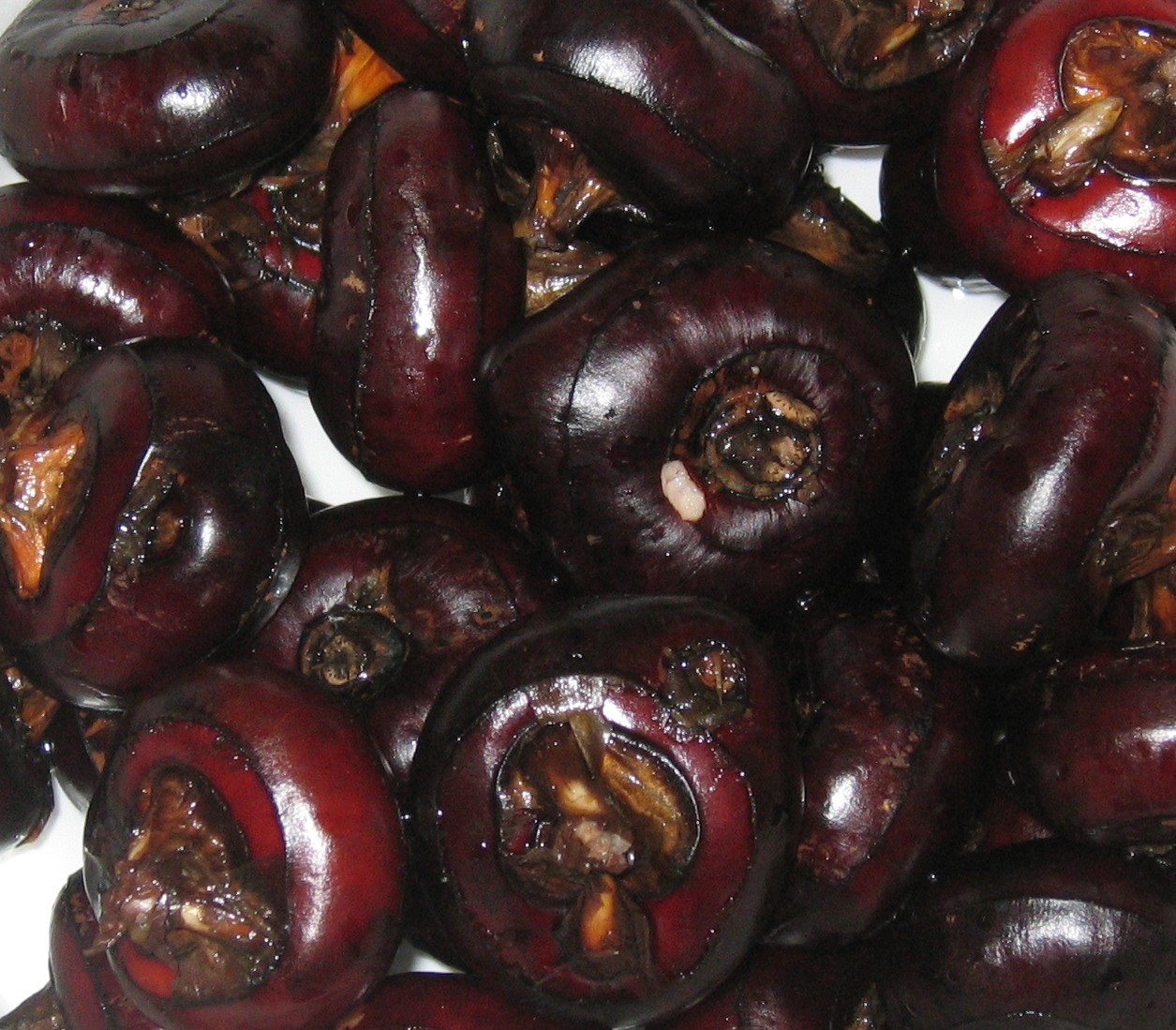
- Corms of chinese water chestnut

Conservation status
- Least Concern (IUCN 3.1)

Scientific classification
- Kingdom: Plantae
- Clade: Tracheophytes
- Clade: Angiosperms
- Clade: Monocots
- Clade: Commelinids
- Order: Poales
- Family: Cyperaceae
- Genus: Eleocharis
- Species: E. dulcis

Binomial name
- Eleocharis dulcis (Burm.f.) Trin. ex Hensch.

Synonyms
- Eleocharis equisetina; Eleocharis indica; Eleocharis plantaginea, Eleocharis plantaginoides; Eleocharis tuberosa; Eleocharis tumida; and several more

= Eleocharis dulcis =

Chinese water chestnut

Grass-like sedge grown for its edible corms

Eleocharis dulcis
- Traditional Chinese: 荸薺
- Simplified Chinese: 荸荠
Transcriptions
Standard Mandarin
- Hanyu Pinyin: bíqí
- IPA: [pǐ.tɕʰǐ]

Cantonese name
- Traditional Chinese: 馬蹄
- Simplified Chinese: 马蹄
Transcriptions
Yue: Cantonese
- Yale Romanization: máah-tàih
- Jyutping: maa^{5}-tai^{4}
- IPA: [ma˩˧ tʰɐj˩]

Chinese water chestnut
Nutritional value per 100 g (3.5 oz)
- Energy: 406 kJ (97 kcal)
- Carbohydrates: 23.94 g
- Sugars: 4.8 g
- Dietary fiber: 3 g
- Fat: 0.1 g
- Protein: 1.4 g
Vitamins and minerals
Vitamins	Quantity %DV^{†}
Thiamine (B1)	12% 0.14 mg
Riboflavin (B2)	15% 0.2 mg
Niacin (B3)	6% 1 mg
Pantothenic acid (B5)	10% 0.479 mg
Vitamin B6	19% 0.328 mg
Folate (B9)	4% 16 μg
Vitamin C	4% 4 mg
Vitamin E	8% 1.2 mg
Minerals	Quantity %DV^{†}
Calcium	1% 11 mg
Iron	0% 0.06 mg
Magnesium	5% 22 mg
Manganese	14% 0.331 mg
Phosphorus	5% 63 mg
Potassium	19% 584 mg
Zinc	5% 0.5 mg
- Other constituents: Quantity
- Water: 73.5 g
- Link to USDA Database entry
- ^{†}Percentages estimated using US recommendations for adults, except for potassium, which is estimated based on expert recommendation from the National Academies.

Eleocharis dulcis, the Chinese water chestnut or water chestnut, is a grass-like sedge native to Asia, tropical Africa, and Oceania. It is grown in many countries for its edible corms, but if eaten uncooked, the surface of the plants may transmit fasciolopsiasis.

The water caltrop, which also is referred to by the same name, is unrelated and often confused with the water chestnut.

== Description ==
The water chestnut is not a nut but rather an aquatic vegetable that grows in marshes, under water, or in mud. It has stem-like, tubular green leaves that grow to about 1.5 m (5 ft).

== Distribution ==
The plant is native to Asia, tropical Africa, and Oceania.

== Ecology ==
In the dry season of the Northern Territory in Australia, magpie geese eat the bulbs of water chestnuts, allowing them to put on fat for the wet season and ensuring they are ready for breeding. In the wet season, water chestnut leaves are used to build their floating nests.

== Cultivation ==
The crop can be cultivated in paddies, 2–7.5 m (7–25 ft) wide by up to 100 m (330 ft) long to allow for mechanization, or in a hydroponic culture. As it is an aquatic plant, it should always be submerged in approximately 10 cm (4 in) of water. The crop needs continuously high soil temperatures, ideally 14–15.5 °C (57–60 °F). At 13.6 °C (56.5 °F), the corms begin to sprout. Soil is ideally a sandy loam with pH 6.5 to 7.2. The plant produces two types of subterranean rhizomes. Under long-daylength conditions, rhizomes grow horizontally and then turn upwards forming daughter plants. Under short-daylength conditions, the rhizomes grow downward and produce a corm at the tip. The photoperiod also significantly influences how fast the corms grow. Corms begin to develop much more slowly if the photoperiod exceeds 12 hours. The corms are also the propagating material. Alternatively, transplants can be used. Machinery, such as tractor-mounted vegetable planters, can be used for plantation.

=== Plant nutrition ===
Nitrogen addition is beneficial for corm production, applying a dose before planting and another dose when corms begin to enlarge. To further improve nutrient levels, potassium and phosphorus mineral fertilizers can be used before planting, where the N:P:K uptake ratio is 1:0.5:1.75. Also organic mulch, especially mushroom compost, shows good results.

=== Harvest ===
Once the corms turn dark brown, they should be harvested. If left in the soil after this point in time, corms will get sweeter, however shelf life will decline. The corms can be harvested using a modified gladiolus corm harvester once the paddy is drained. Alternatively, a "water-suction harvester" can be used without the need to drain the paddy. The corms have to be washed after harvest and brushed once they are dry.

=== Yield ===
The per plant yield was described at 2.3 kg (5 lb 1 oz) per season (fresh matter). In China, yields are reported between 20–40 t/ha (9–18 short ton/acre), while in the United States a range between 47–85 t/ha (21–38 short ton/acre) has been mentioned.

=== Storage ===
The harvested corms are best stored at 4 °C (39 °F). At this temperature, transpiration and thus weight loss are minimized. This will also delay sprouting and minimize deterioration resulting from small injuries. Corms should not be stored at temperatures above 13.6 °C (56.5 °F) as otherwise the corms will begin to sprout. If the corms need to be stored longer term, they can also be kept in a bleach solution of 1000 ppm.

=== Pests ===
Chinese water chestnut is usually not very prone to pests; nevertheless, some animals and fungi may attack the plant: Water fowl may damage the stems and corms, especially when plants are young. Similarly, rodents and grazing animals pose a threat to the Chinese water chestnut, which may be discouraged by keeping the paddy inundated. Caddisfly larvae (Trichoptera) and other leaf-eating caterpillars also feed on the stems. However, unless complete defoliation below the waterline occurs, the plants can normally tolerate this damage. Plant hoppers (Fulgoridae) and scale insects feed on plant sap and may cause subsequent death. Other pests include the nematodes Ditylenchus and Dolichodorus heterocephalus. Fungal species can also attack the Chinese water chestnut. In warmer climates, a rust is caused by Uromyces, and Cylindrosporium eleocharidis causes stem blight.

== Disease potential ==
If eaten uncooked, the surface of the plants may transmit fasciolopsiasis.

== Uses ==
=== Nutrition ===
Raw water chestnuts are 74% water, 24% carbohydrates, 1% protein, and contain very little fat. In a 100-gram reference amount, raw water chestnuts supply 410 kilojoules (97 kcal) of food energy, are rich (20% or more of the Daily Value, DV) in vitamin B_{6} (25% DV), and contain moderate amounts of other B vitamins, manganese, and potassium (10% to 17% DV).

=== Culinary ===
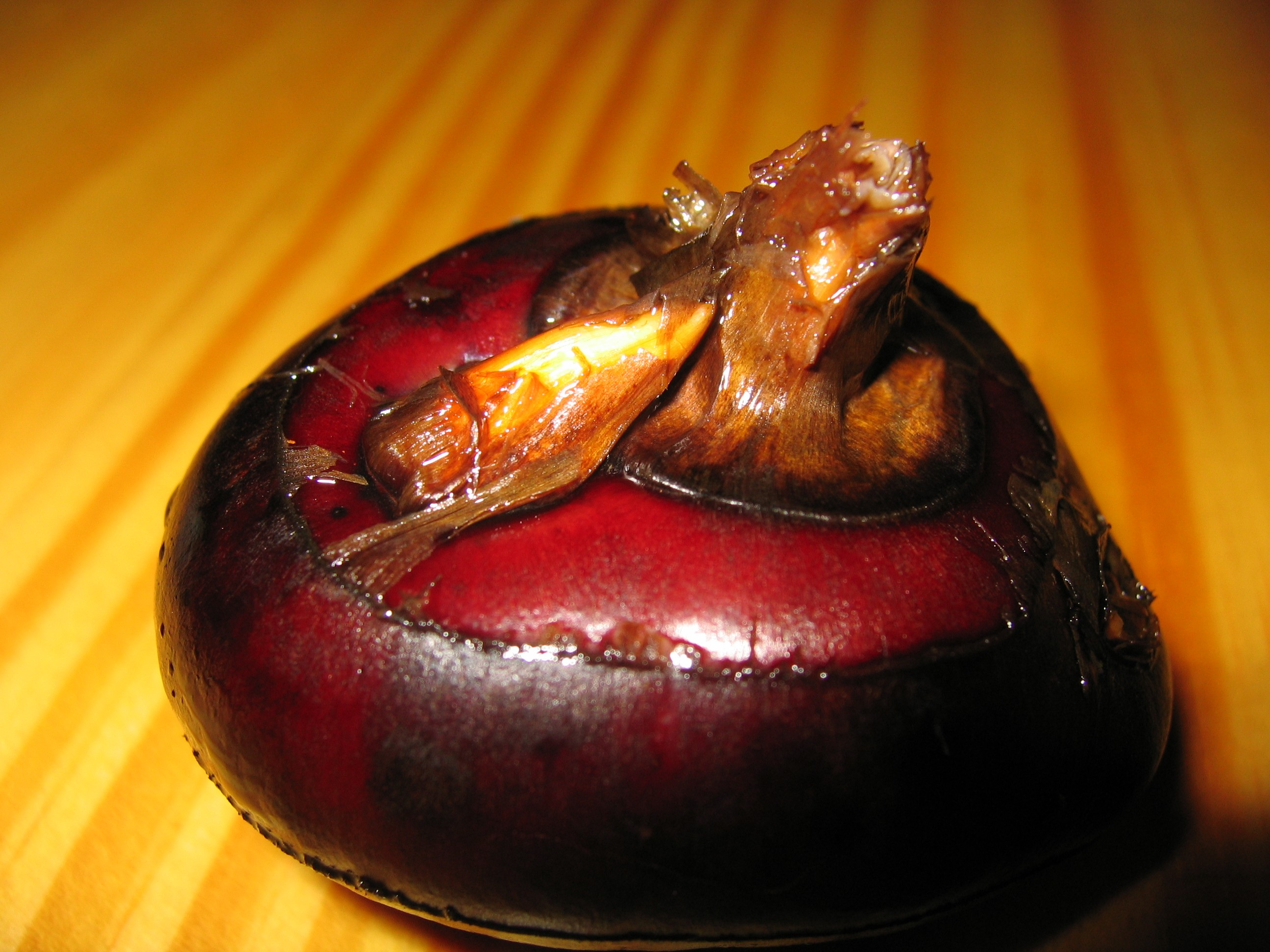
Corm of Eleocharis dulcis

Raw water chestnuts are edible, and are slightly sweet and crunchy. The small, rounded corms have a crisp, white flesh and may be eaten raw, slightly boiled, or grilled, and often are pickled or tinned. Boiled water chestnuts have a firm and slightly crunchy texture, with a mild and slightly nutty flavor that may easily be overpowered by seasonings or sauces with which the water chestnut is served or cooked. They may be combined with bamboo shoots, coriander, ginger, sesame oil, and snow peas. Steamed or sauteed vegetable dishes may contain water chestnuts, such as noodle or rice recipes. They may also be added to minced-meat fillings and dishes, such as Cantonese dim sum-style steamed meatballs, to add a crunchy texture. The Thai dessert thapthim krop, with water chestnuts as its main ingredient, was named one of the world's best 50 desserts in 2019 by CNN Travel.

The corms are a popular ingredient in Chinese cuisine, in which they are most often eaten raw, sometimes sweetened. They also may be ground into a flour form used for making water chestnut cake, which is common as part of dim sum cuisine. They are unusual among vegetables for remaining crisp even after being cooked or canned, because their cell walls are cross-linked and strengthened by certain phenolic compounds, such as oligomers of ferulic acid. This property is shared by other vegetables that remain crisp in this manner, including the tiger nut, lotus root and spurge nettle root. The corms contain the antibiotic agent puchiin, which is stable to high temperature.

=== Other uses ===
Apart from the edible corms, the leaves can be used for cattlefeed, mulch or compost.
