= Pork ball =

Traditional Taiwanese pork dish

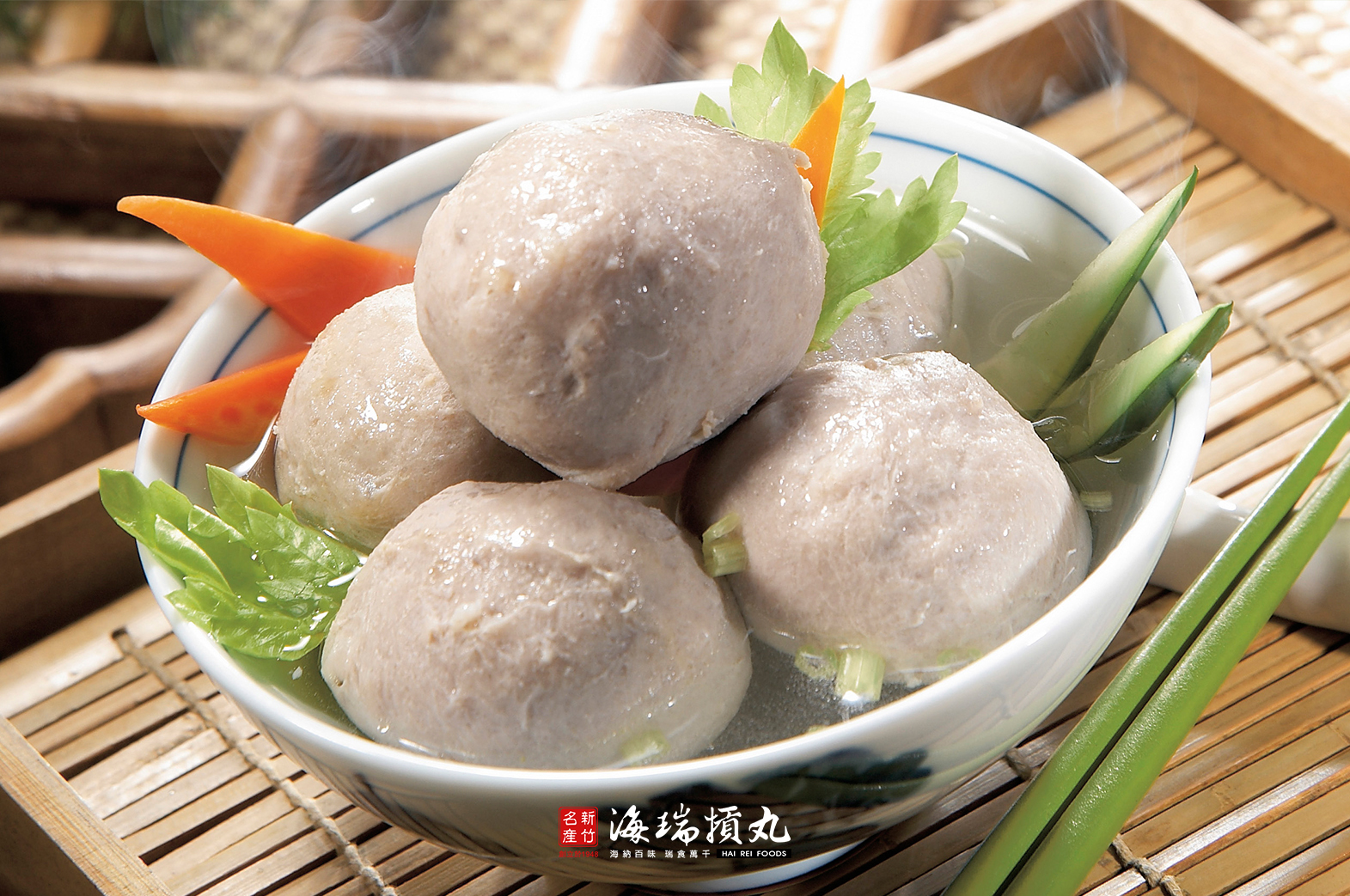
- Gongwan, or pork meatballs
- Type: Meatball
- Main ingredients: Pork, starch

Pork ball
- Traditional Chinese: 貢丸
- Simplified Chinese: 贡丸
- Literal meaning: pounded balls
Transcriptions
Standard Mandarin
- Hanyu Pinyin: gòngwán
Southern Min
- Hokkien POJ: kòng-ôan

Alternative Chinese name
- Traditional Chinese: 摃丸
- Simplified Chinese: 扛丸
Transcriptions
Standard Mandarin
- Hanyu Pinyin: n/a
Southern Min
- Hokkien POJ: kòng-ôan

Pork balls, also called kòng-ôan or gongwan, are Chinese meatballs made from finely minced pork, starch, and sometimes cuttlefish to impart a "chewy" texture and added flavour. They are a common part of the cuisines of Taiwan, China, and other parts of Asia, including Malaysia, Singapore, the Philippines, Indonesia, and Thailand.

== Taiwan ==
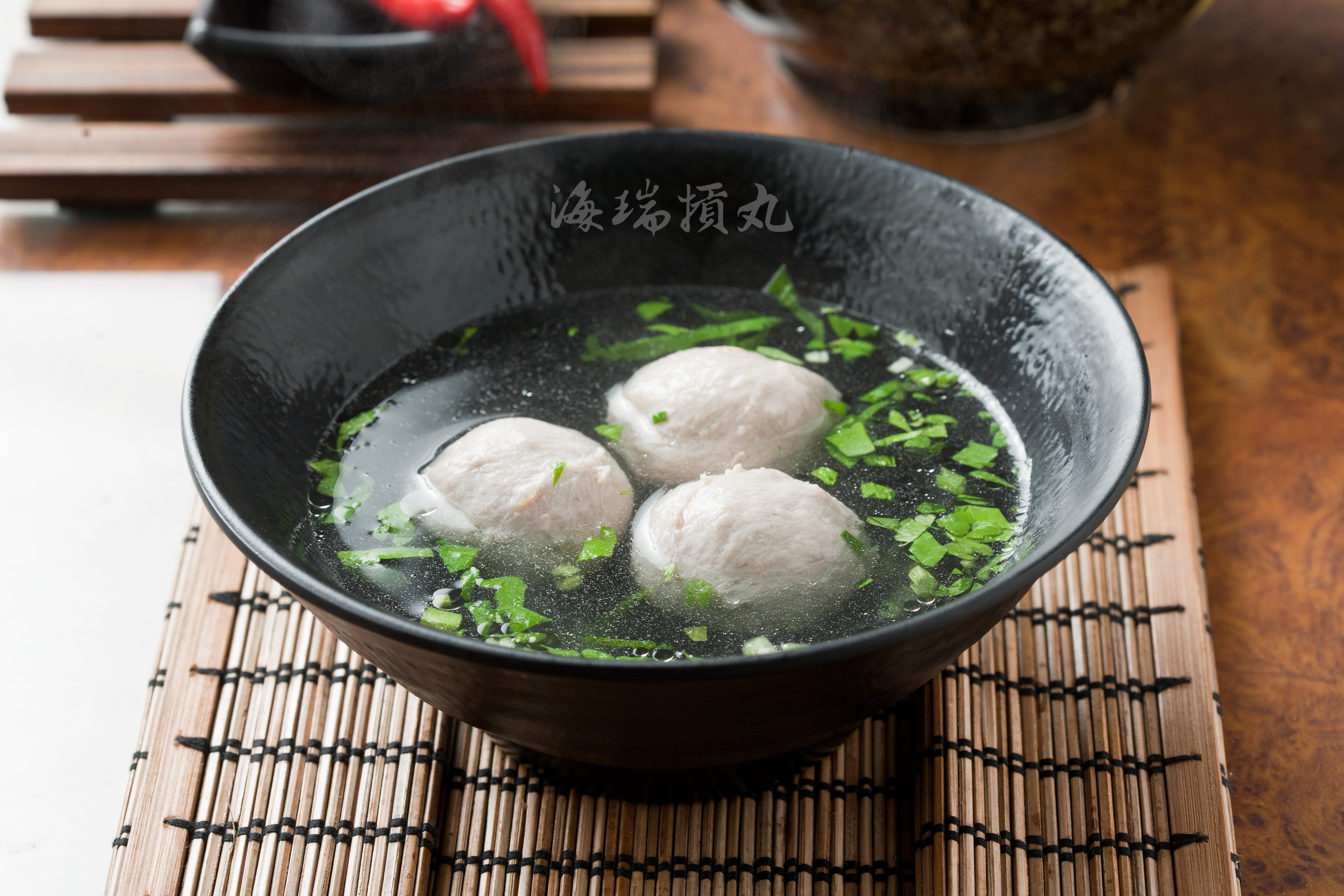
Taiwanese gongwan tang, or pork ball soup

Pork balls are particularly popular in the Taiwanese city of Hsinchu, where an annual festival is dedicated to them. The name originally derives from Taiwanese: 摃 (to pound with a mallet) + 丸 (ball). However, the first character is usually rendered as 貢 (tribute, gifts) because its Mandarin pronunciation more closely matches the Taiwanese pronunciation of 摃.

In Taiwan, pork balls are most commonly served in a soup called gongwan tang (貢丸湯; pinyin: gòngwán tāng; POJ: kòng-ôan-thng), which is essentially a clear broth topped with chopped coriander leaf and green onions. They are also served in various kinds of noodle soup, such as cart noodles and soup in Hong Kong.

== Vietnam ==
In Vietnam, pork ball (thịt heo viên) may be roasted or eaten with tomato sauce.

== See also ==
- Beef ball
- Fish ball
- Lion's head
- List of meatball dishes
- Steamed meatball
- Taiwanese cuisine
