= Steamed meatball =

Cantonese dim sum dish

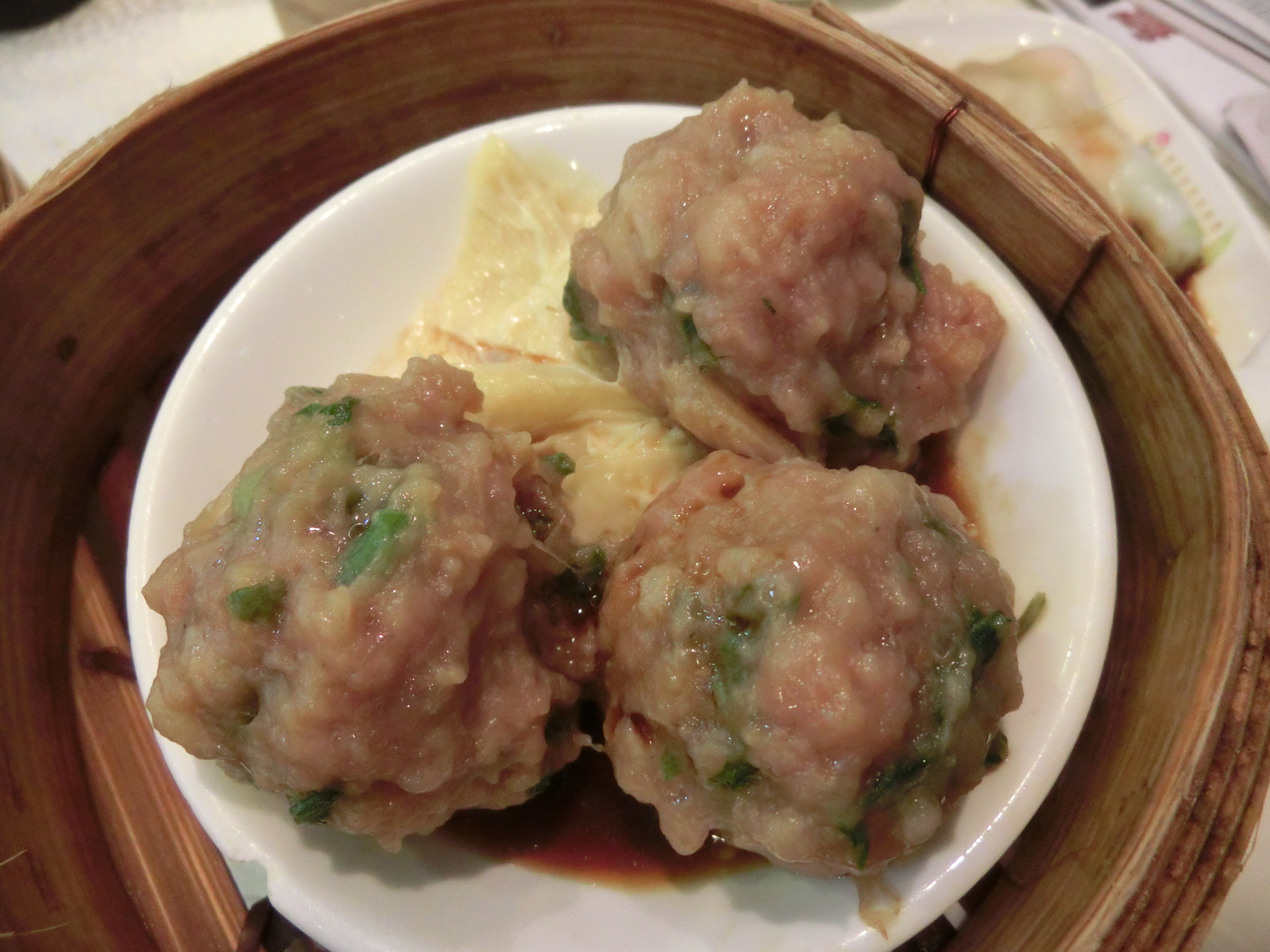
- Steamed meatballs in a bamboo steamer
- Course: Dim sum
- Place of origin: Hong Kong, Guangdong
- Main ingredients: Beef

Steamed meatball
- Chinese: 山竹牛肉丸
- Jyutping: saan1 zuk1 ngau4 juk6 jyun2
- Hanyu Pinyin: shānzhú niúròu wán
- Literal meaning: tofu bamboo beef ball
Transcriptions
Standard Mandarin
- Hanyu Pinyin: shānzhú niúròu wán
Yue: Cantonese
- Yale Romanization: sāanjūk ngàuh yuhk yún
- Jyutping: saan1 zuk1 ngau4 juk6 jyun2

Steamed meatball (山竹牛肉) is a common Cantonese dim sum dish. It is popular in Hong Kong and most overseas Chinatowns. The meatballs are usually made of minced beef, with water chestnut to add texture and with coriander and a few slivers of chan pei or dried orange peel used as seasoning. A layer of tofu skin, or sometimes peas, are used to raise the meatballs from the bottom of the dish and prevent them from sitting in the cooking juices. It is generally served with Worcestershire sauce (Chinese: 喼汁; Jyutping: gip1 zap1; Cantonese Yale: gīp jāp; pinyin: jiézhī).

== History ==
The meatball originated from Muslims during the Tang dynasty and Song dynasty. Many Hui Muslims, the descendants of Arab traders, live in Guangzhou.

== Gallery ==
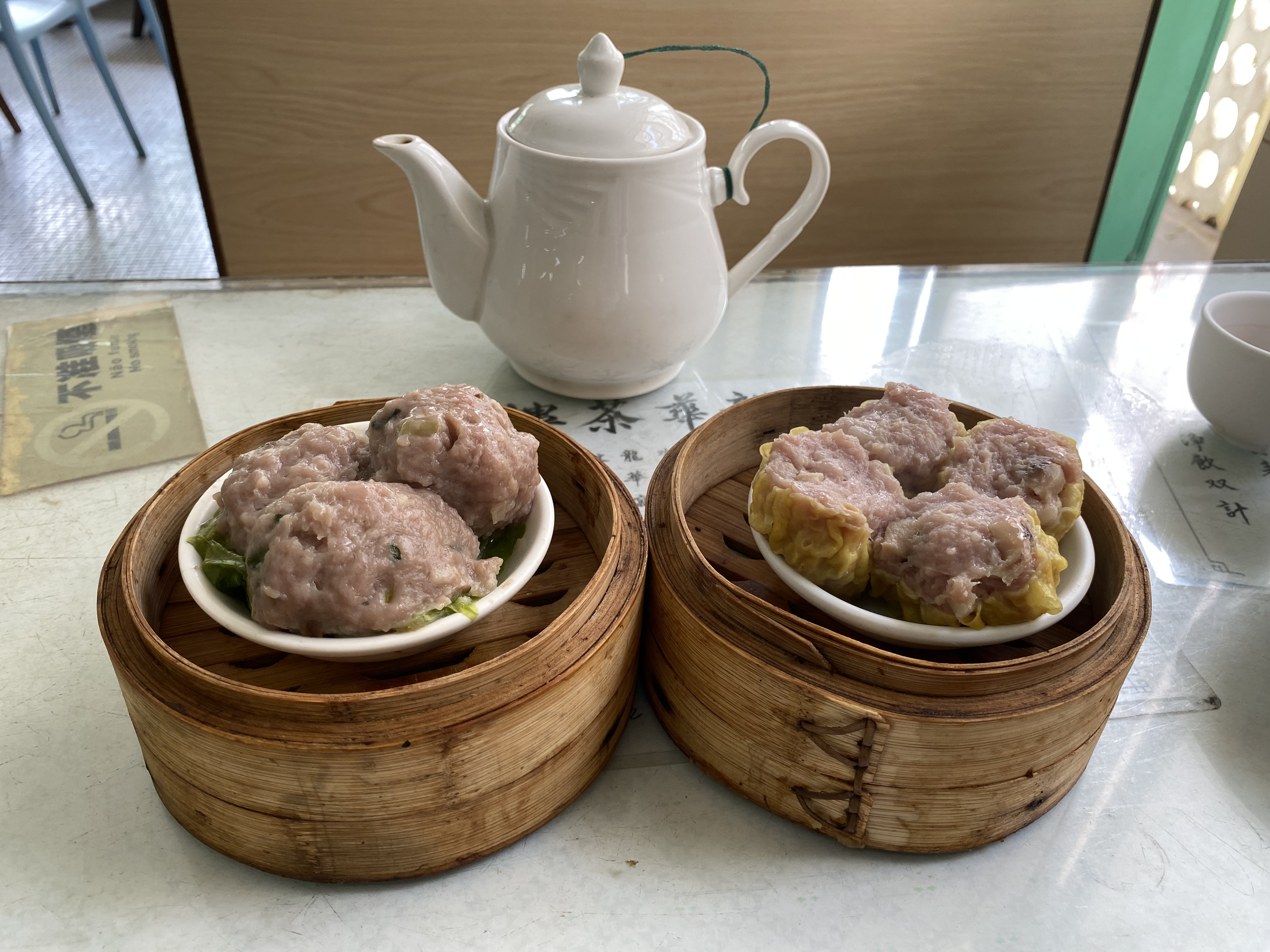

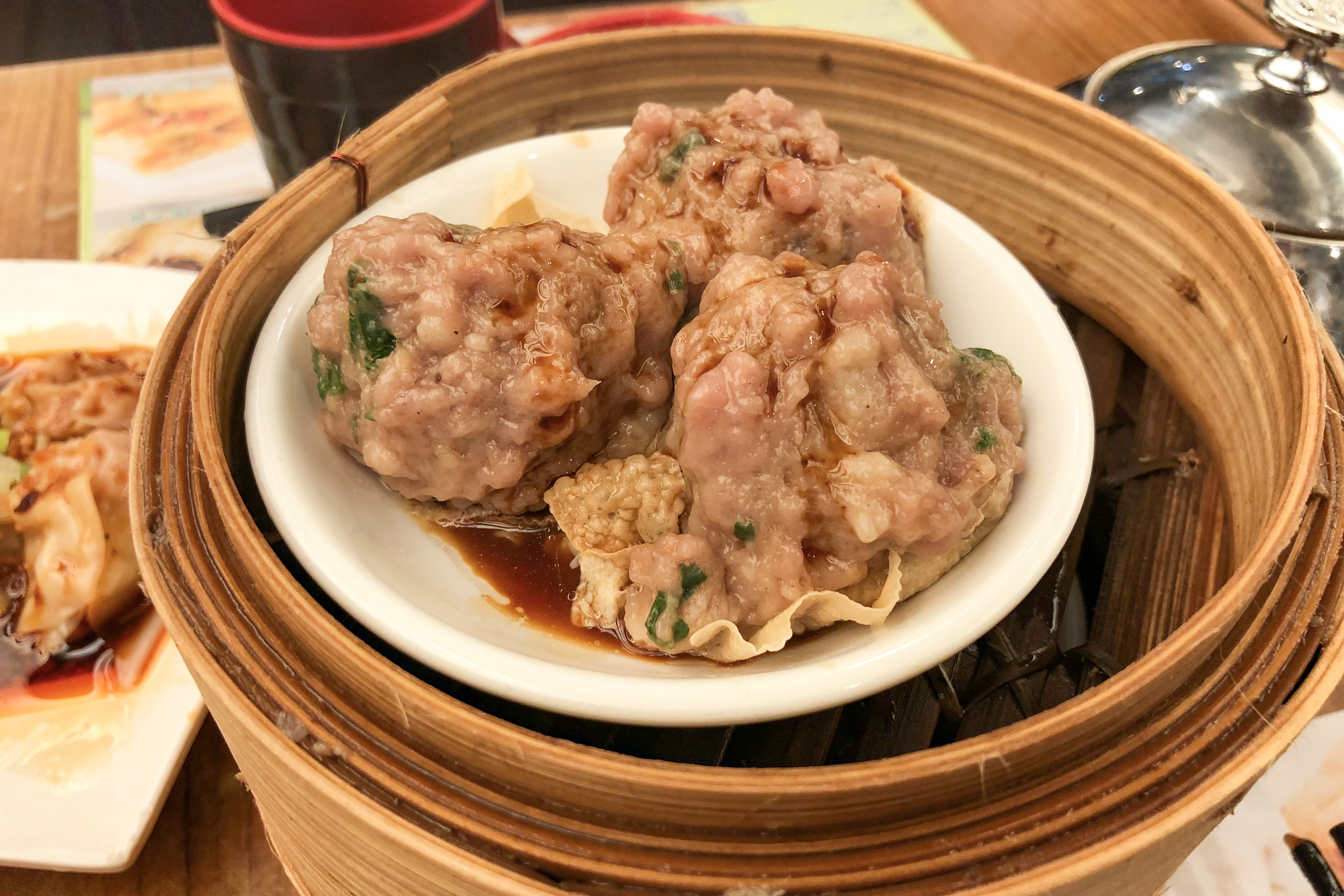

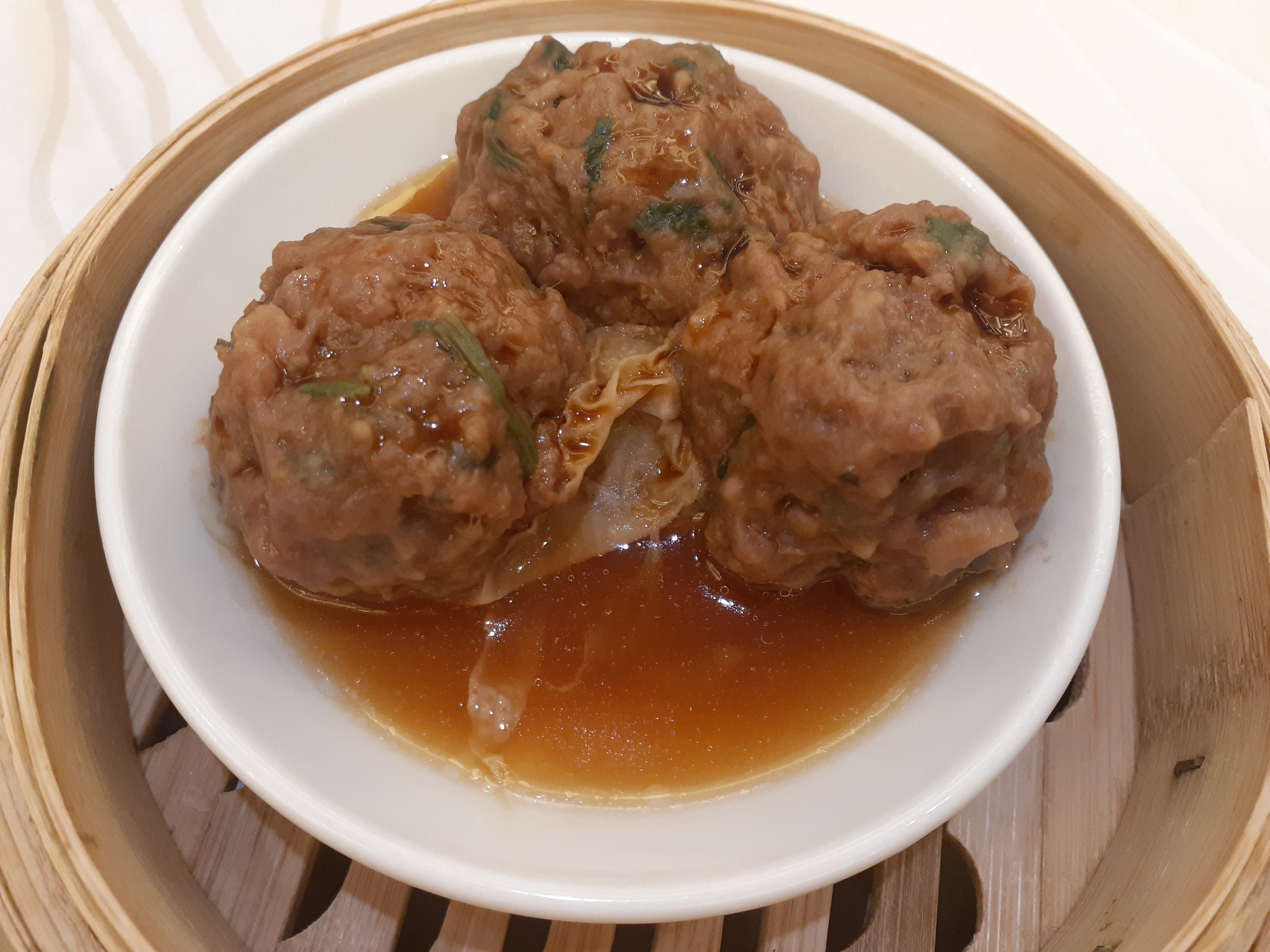

== See also ==
- Shumai
- Beef ball
- Lion's head (food)
- Pearl meatballs
- Pork ball
- Meatball
- Fish ball
- List of meatball dishes
- List of pork dishes
- List of steamed foods
