= Yan-kit So =

Chinese food historian and cookbook writer

Yan-kit So (13 July 1933 – 22 December 2001) was a Chinese food historian and cookery expert who lived and worked mainly in London since the 1960s.

== Career ==
So became known among a wider public for her commercially successful and critically acclaimed cookbooks, which contributed much to the popularization of Chinese cooking in Britain. She joined the Oxford Symposium on Food and Cookery of Alan Davidson in 1981.

== Life ==
Born in Zhongshan, Guangdong province into the family of a tea merchant, Yin Moo So, she grew up in Hong Kong, where she graduated from University with a degree in history, and went on to acquire a DPhil at the University of London.

She was married twice, to a Chinese surgeon, Po Yat Iu, whom she divorced, and then to the American historian Briton Martin Jr, who died of a brain tumour in 1967 and with whom she had a son, Hugo Martin (born 1965). She died in London on 22 December 2001.

== Works ==
- The Classic Chinese Cookbook (1984)
- Wok Cookbook (1985)
- Party Eats (1988), with Paul Bloomfield
- Classic Food Of China (1992)
