= List of steamed foods =

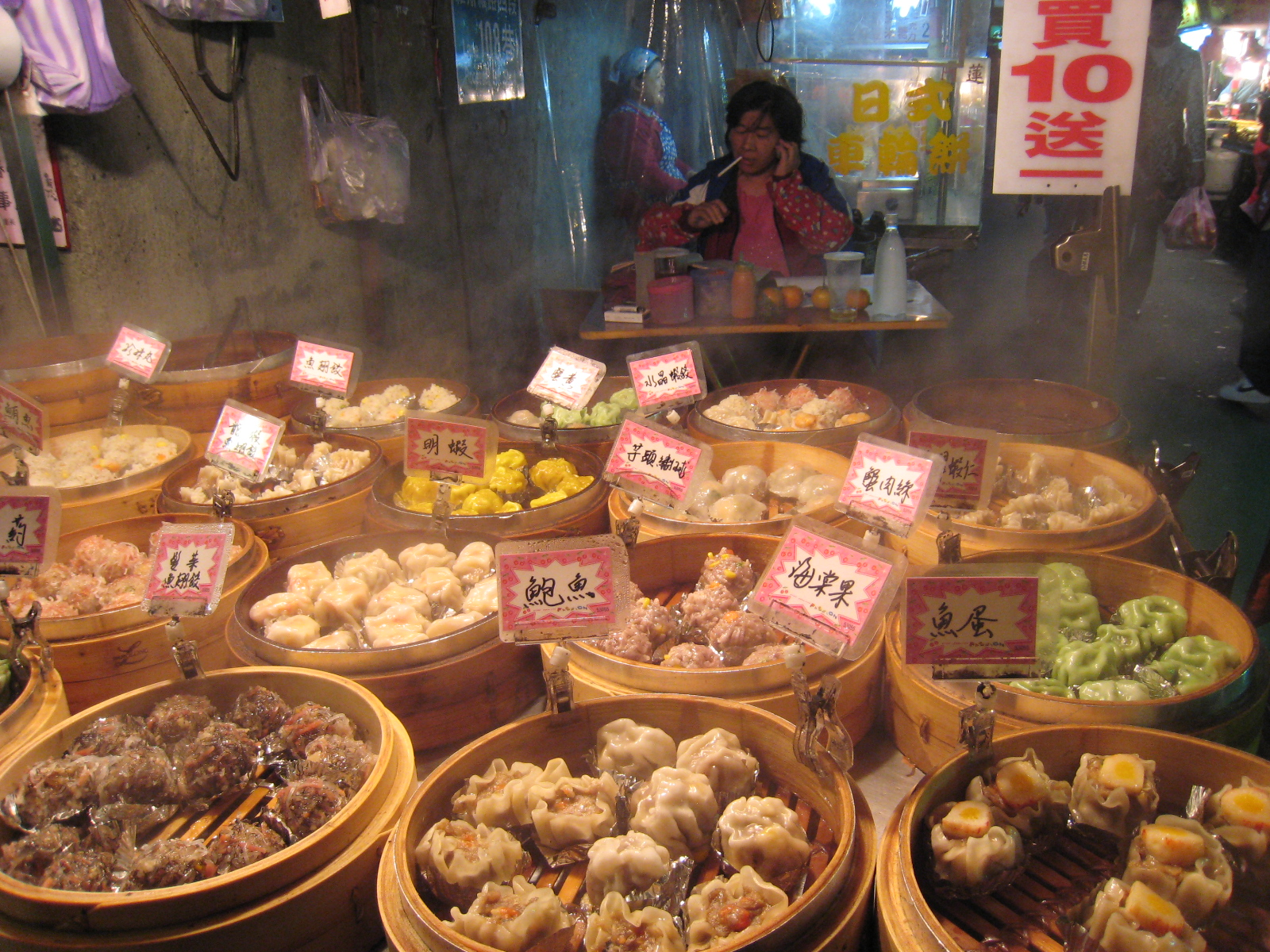
Steamed dim sum in bamboo steamers

This is a list of steamed foods and dishes that are typically or commonly prepared by the cooking method of steaming.

== Steamed foods ==
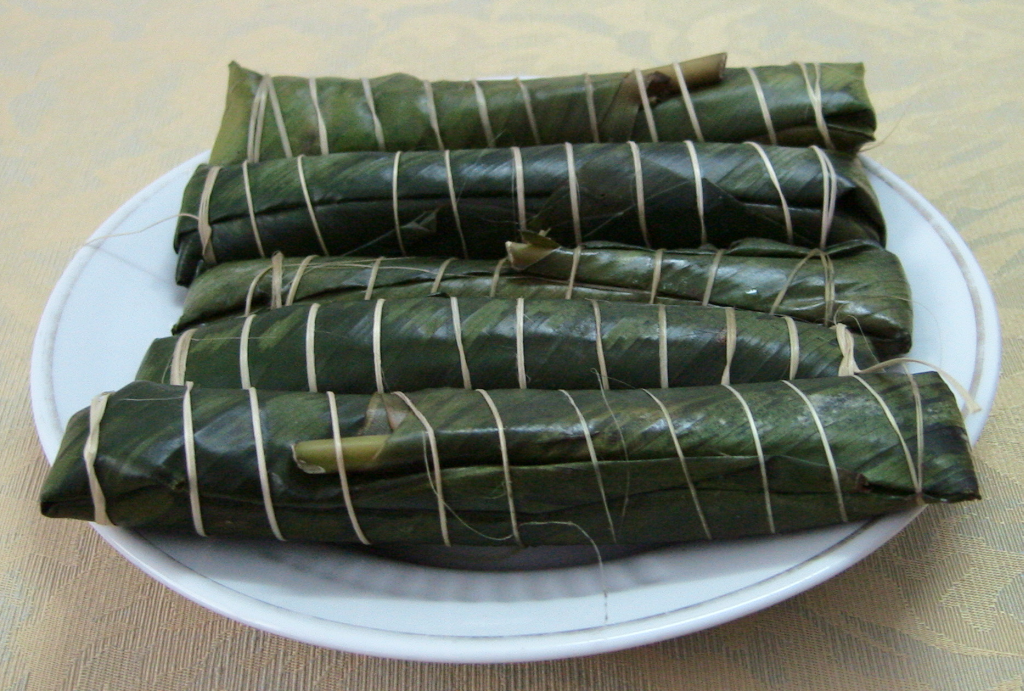
Bánh tẻ wrapped in lá dong leaves

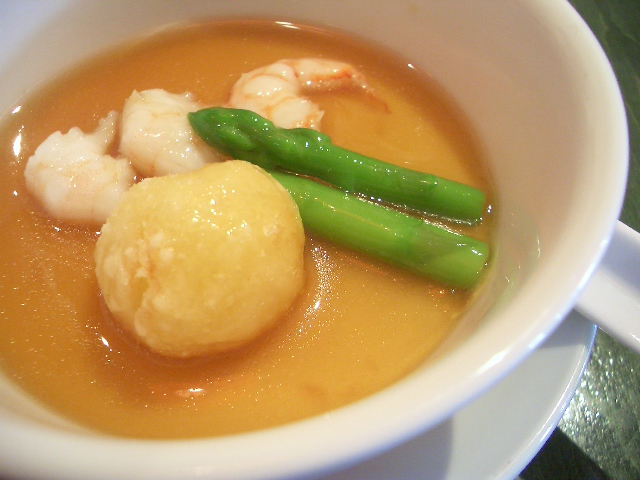
Chinese steamed eggs with shrimp, asparagus and broth

- Ada – a food item from Kerala, usually made of rice flour with sweet filling inside
- Bánh – in Hanoi Vietnamese, translates loosely as "cake" or "bread", referring to a wide variety of prepared foods. Some varieties are cooked by steaming.
  - Bánh bò – a steamed sponge cake
  - Bánh bột lọc
  - Bánh chuối hấp – literally "steamed banana cake"
  - Bánh cuốn
  - Bánh da lợn – a steamed layer cake
  - Bánh khoai mì hấp
  - Bánh tẻ
- Chinese steamed eggs – eggs are beaten to a consistency similar to that used for an omelette and then steamed
- Corunda
- Couscous
- Dhokla
- Jjim – a Korean cuisine term referring to dishes made by steaming or boiling meat, chicken, fish, or shellfish which have been marinated in a sauce or soup
  - Agujjim
  - Andong jjimdak
  - Galbijjim – a variety of jjim or Korean steamed dishes made with galbi (갈비, short rib)
  - Gyeran jjim – a Korean steamed egg casserole, often eaten as a side dish (banchan)
- Kue lapis – Indonesian kue, or a traditional snack of colorful layered soft rice flour pudding or steamed layered cake
- Idli – a dish prepared from rice and black gram; part of Udupi cuisine
- Idiyappam (putu mayam)
- Kwacoco – pureed cocoyam wrapped and steamed in banana leaves
- Lemper
- Nasi campur
- Nasi lemak – a fragrant rice dish cooked in coconut milk and pandan leaf; commonly found in Malaysia, where it is considered the national dish, and the Riau Province of Indonesia

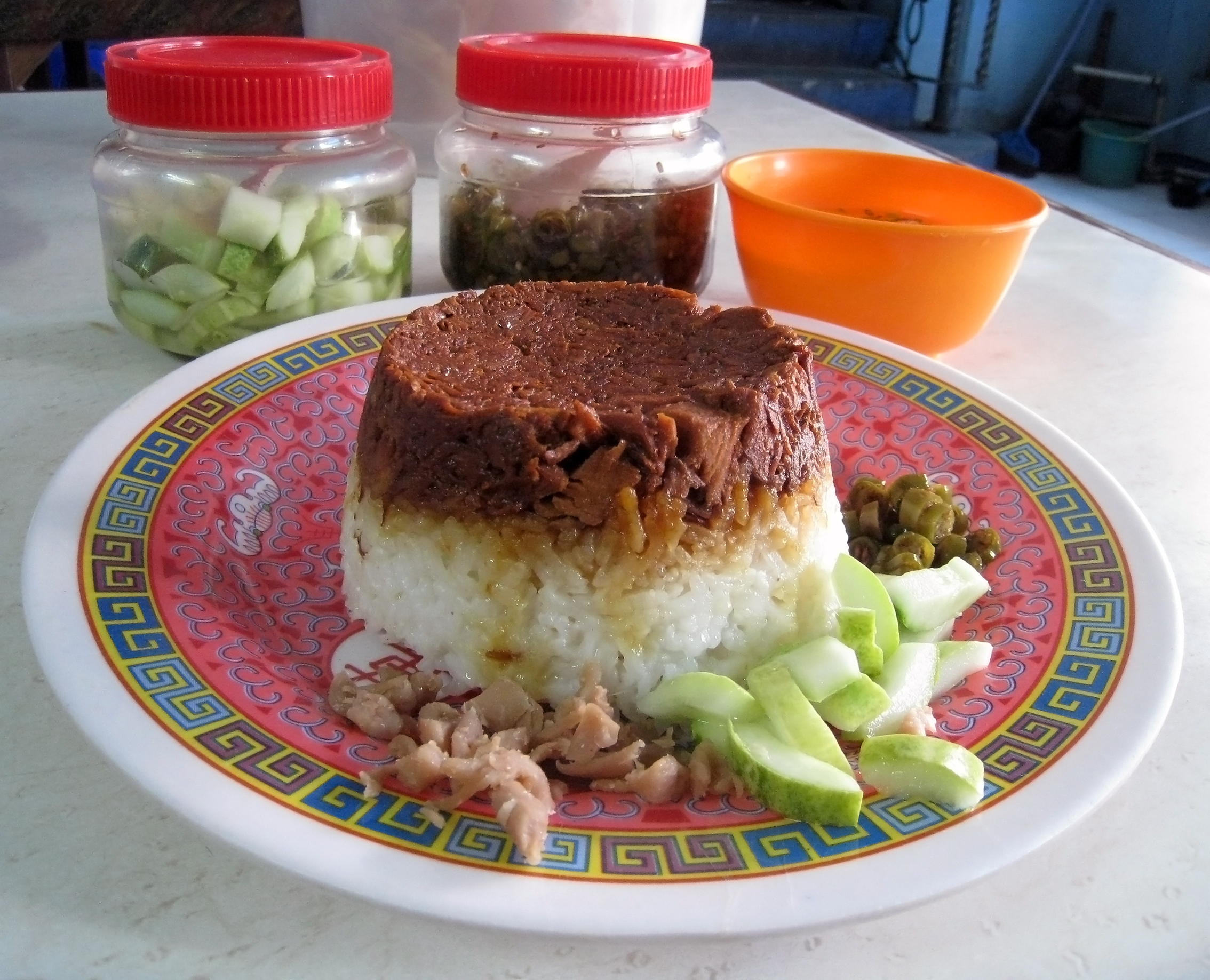
Nasi tim in Jakarta, Indonesia

- Pitha – some varieties are steamed
  - Enduri pitha
  - Manda pitha
  - Tekeli pitha
- Puttu
- Rice noodle roll – a Cantonese dish from southern China including Hong Kong, commonly served either as a snack, small meal or as a variety of dim sum
- Seon – refers to Korean traditional dishes made by steaming vegetables such as zucchini, cucumber, eggplant, or napa cabbage that are stuffed with fillings
- Steamed rice
- Tamales – a Mexican and Central American dish of pre-Columbian origins made with a corn-based dough and a variety of fillings, usually wrapped in banana leaf or corn husks
- Tofu skin roll – the bamboo-steamed version is generally known as sin zuk gyun
- Urap

=== Breads ===
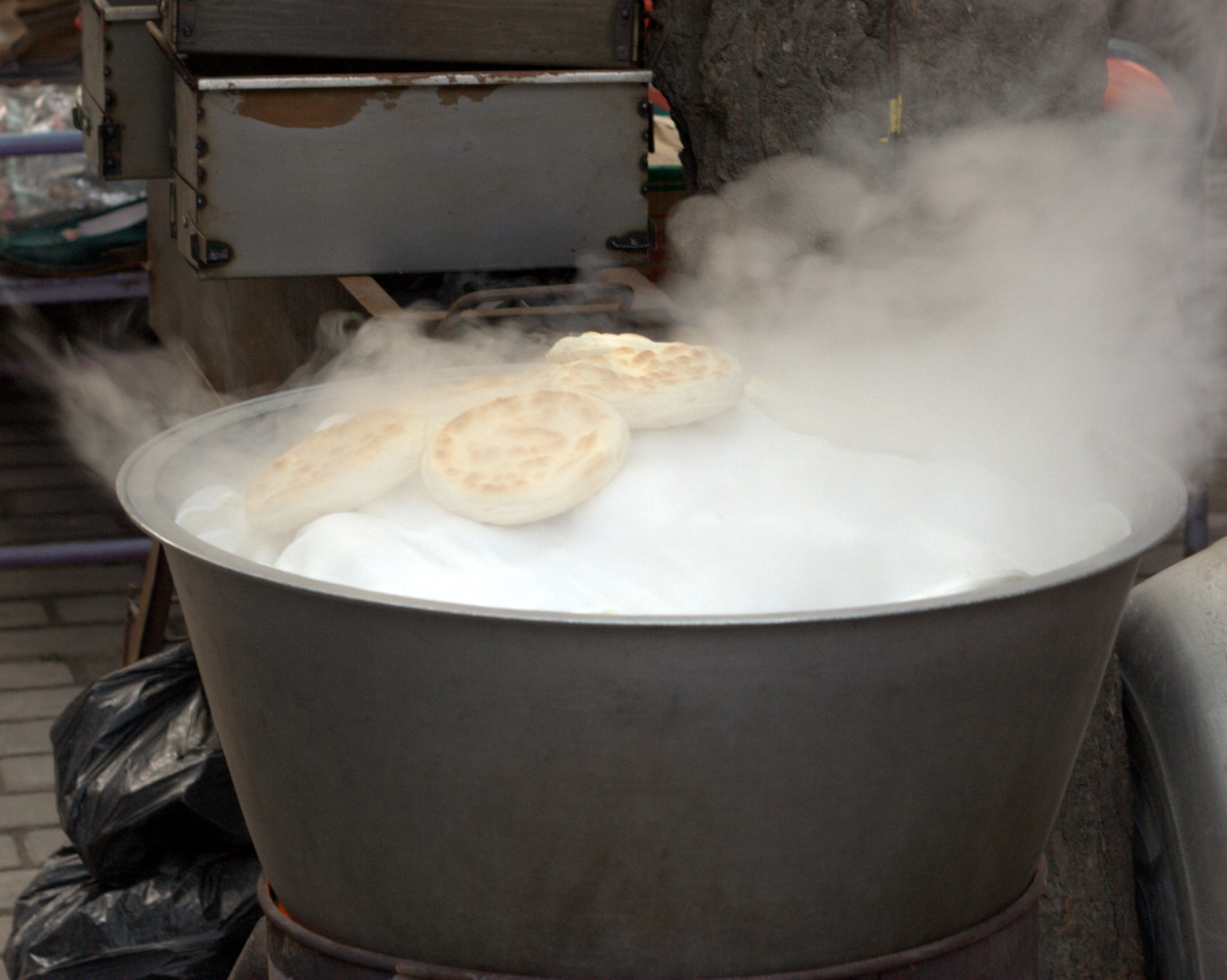
Steamed bread

- Dombolo – a traditional South African steamed bread
- Mantou – a cloud-like steamed bread or bun common in Northern China
- Steamed bread – produced and consumed around the world
  - Milk roll – a steamed bread roll originating in Blackpool, Lancashire
  - Tingmo – a steamed bread in Tibetan cuisine
  - Wotou – a type of steamed bread made from cornmeal in Northern China

=== Buns and rolls ===
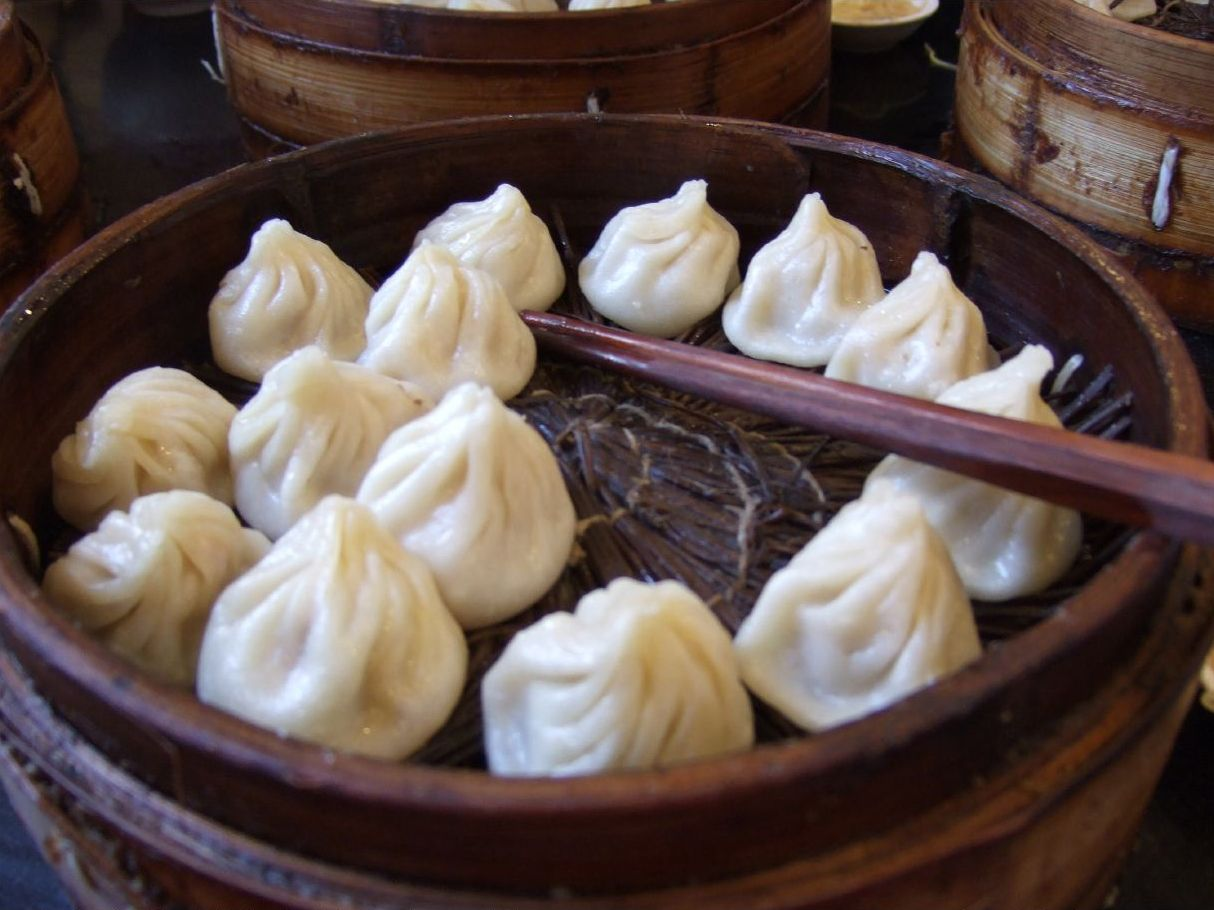
Xiaolongbao

- Bánh bao
- Baozi
  - Bakpau
  - Cha siu bao
  - Goubuli
  - Nikuman
  - Shengjian mantou
  - Siopao
  - Tangbao – large, soup-filled steamed buns in Chinese cuisine
  - Xiaolongbao
- Da bao
- Dampfnudel
- Hoppang
- Jjinppang
- Lotus seed bun
  - Longevity peach
- Mandarin roll – Chinese steamed rolls

=== Cakes ===
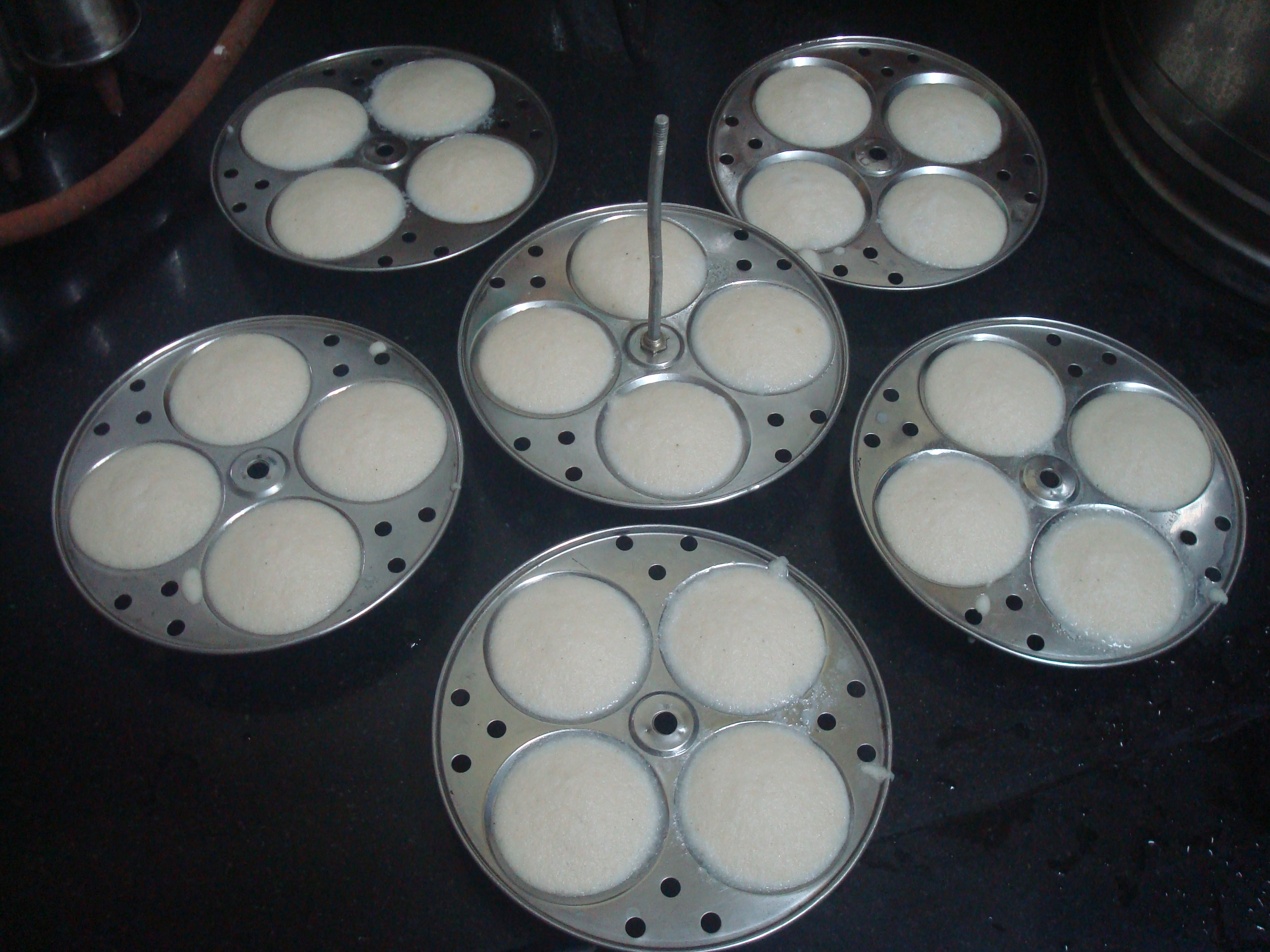
Idli in steaming molds

- Bánh bèo
- Idli – cakes made by steaming a batter consisting of fermented black lentils (de-husked) and rice. Idli is a traditional breakfast in Indian households, and is also popular throughout India and neighbouring countries like Sri Lanka.
  - Rava idli
- Khanom sai bua
- Kue putu – a traditional cylindrical-shaped and green-colored steamed cake. It is consumed in Indonesia, Malaysia, and the Philippines.
- Nagasari – a traditional steamed cake made from rice flour, coconut milk and sugar, filled with slices of banana.
- Nian gao
- Red tortoise cake
- Taro cake – typically steamed or fried
- Treacle sponge pudding – a traditional British dessert dish consisting of a steamed sponge cake with golden syrup cooked on top of it, often served with hot custard poured atop
- Turnip cake
- Uirō
- White sugar sponge cake

=== Confectionery and sweets ===
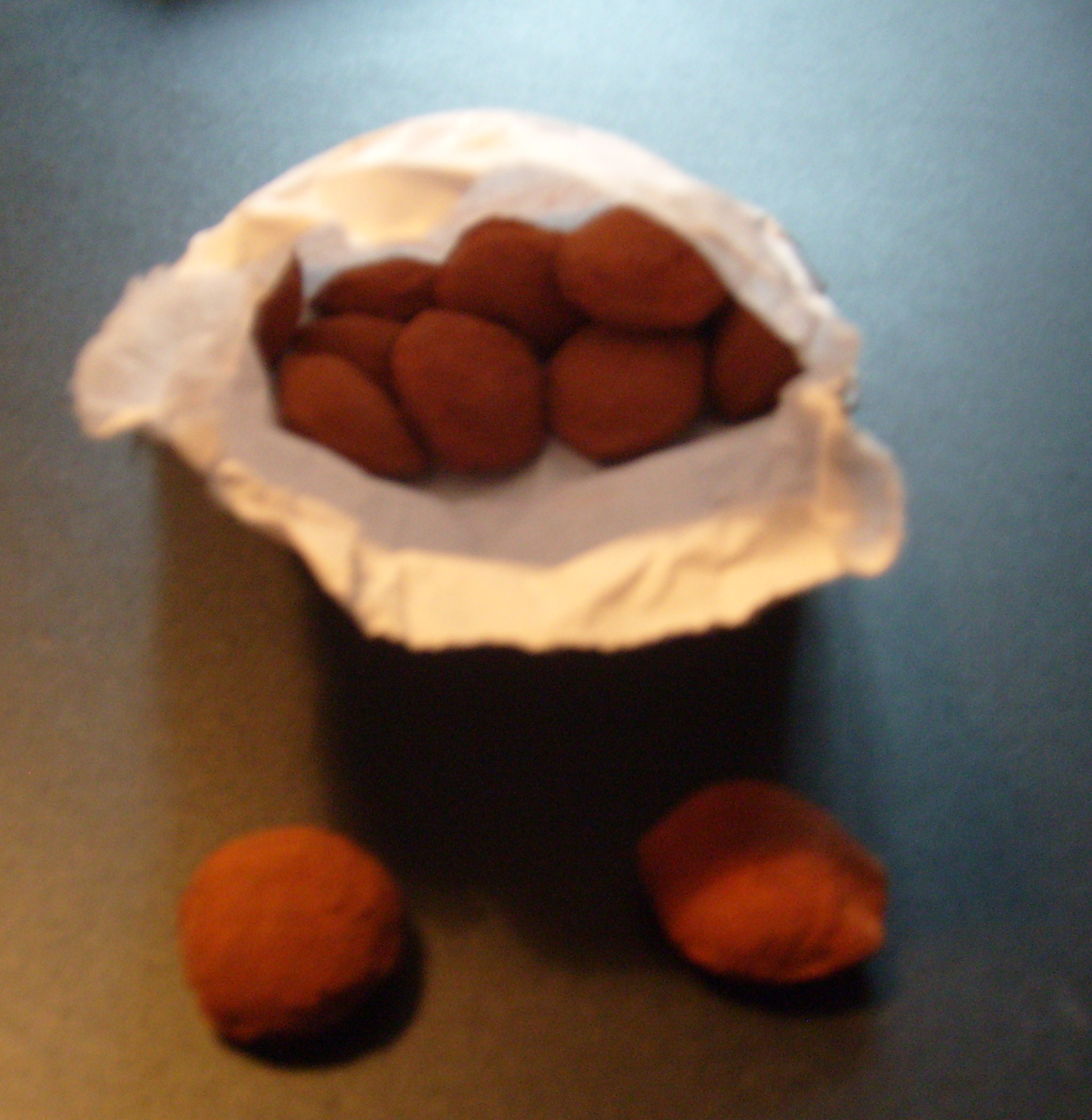
Lucky tatties

- Karukan
- Kue and kuih
  - Clorot
  - Kue mangkok
  - Kue putu mangkok
  - Seri muka
- Lucky tattie
- Put chai ko

=== Custards ===
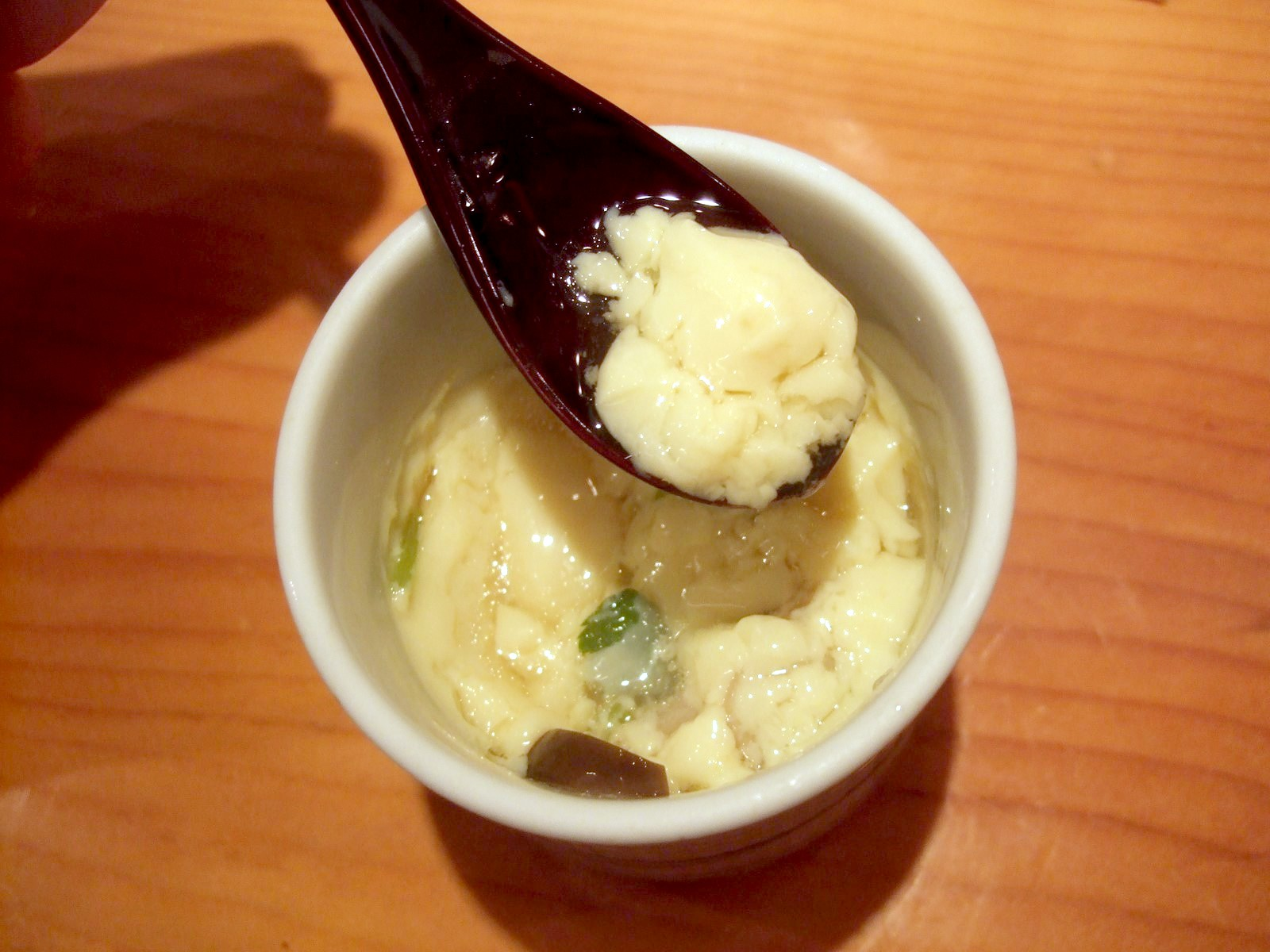
Chawanmushi

- Chawanmushi – (茶碗蒸し, Chawanmushi, literally "tea cup steam" or "steamed in a tea bowl"), an egg custard dish found in Japan.

=== Dumplings ===
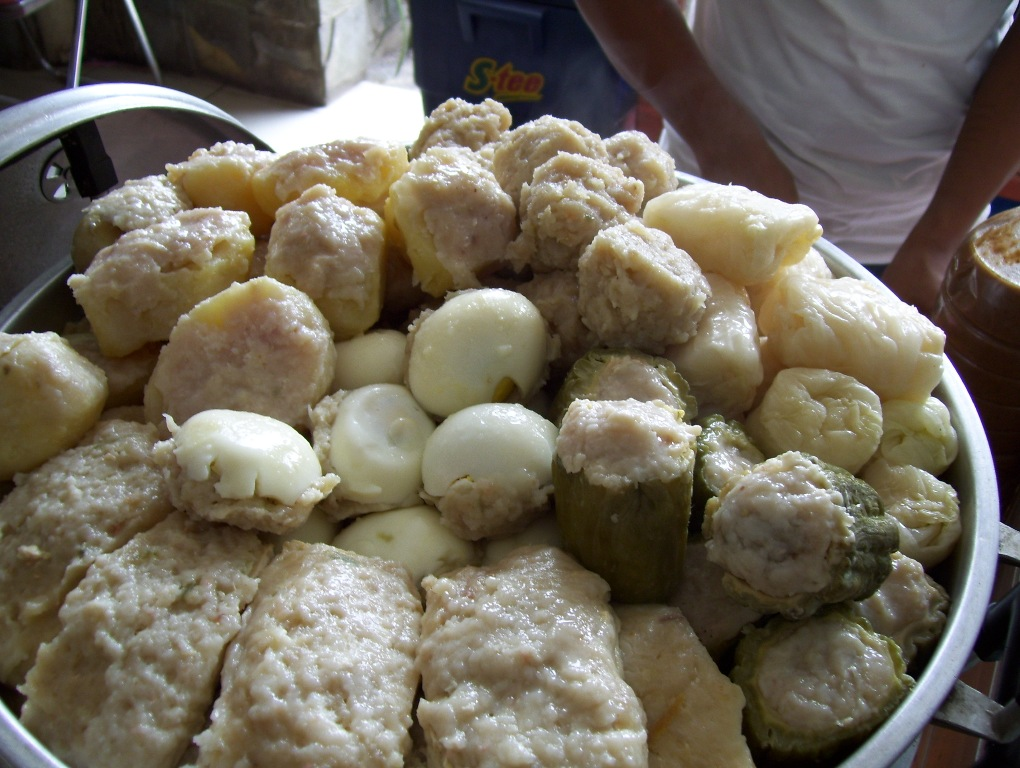
Varieties of steamed siomay: tofu, potatoes, cabbages, bitter gourd and eggs

- Burasa – a rice dumpling cooked with coconut milk packed inside a banana leaf pouch; a speciality of the Bugis and Makassar people of South Sulawesi, Indonesia
- Buuz
- Germknödel
- Har gow - Chinese shrimp dumplings
- Jiaozi
- Lepet
- Mandu
  - Eomandu
- Momo – a type of steamed bun in Tibetan cuisine with or without filling
- Pampuchy - steamed yeast dumplings from Poland
- Patrode
- Shumai - Chinese pork dumplings served in dim sum
- Siomay – an Indonesian steamed fish dumpling with vegetables served in peanut sauce. It is derived from Chinese shumai.

=== Meat-based ===
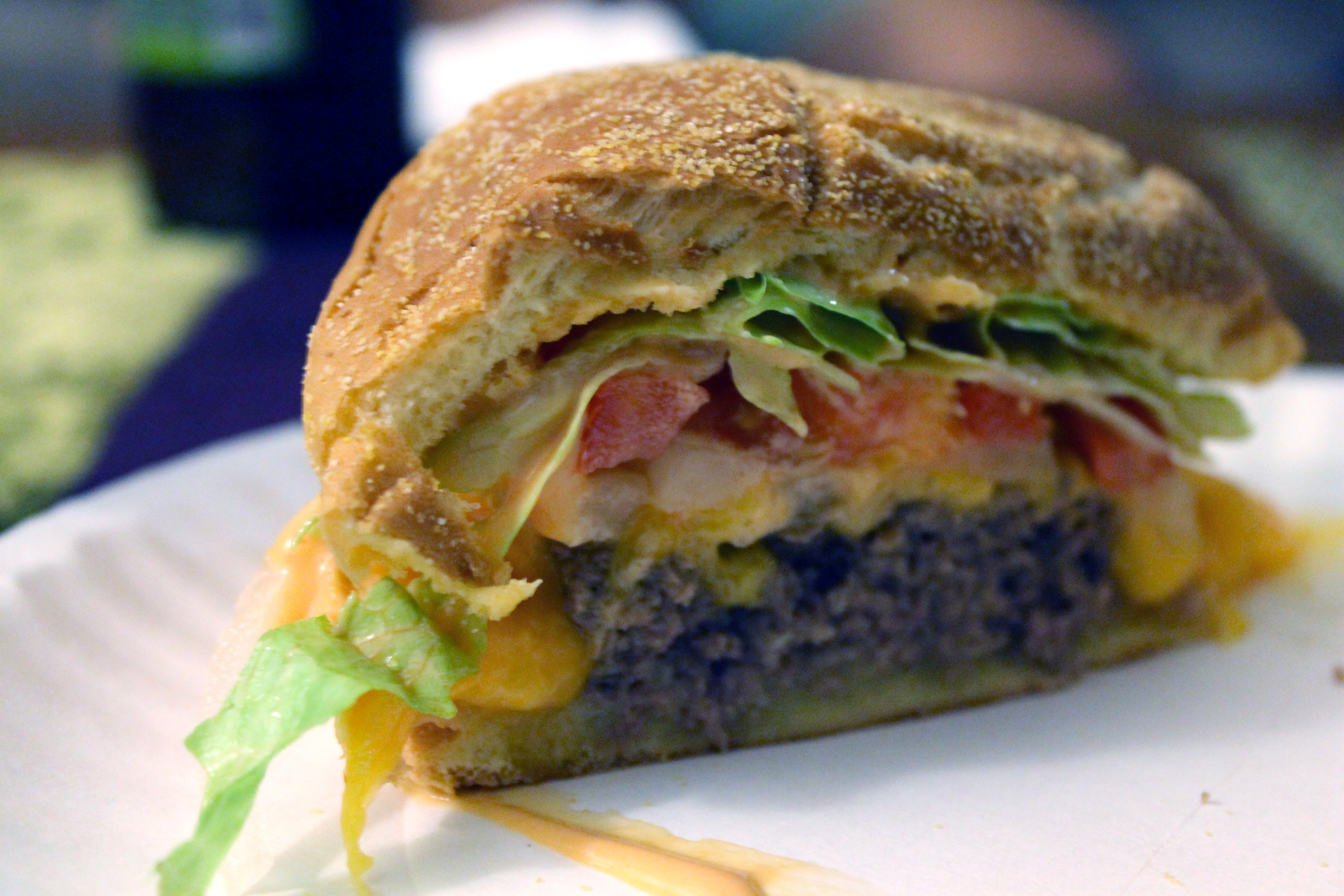
Half of a steamed cheeseburger

- Nasi tim – a Chinese-Indonesian steamed chicken rice dish
- Steamed cheeseburger – a hamburger sandwich topped with cheese that is steamed in a specially made cabinet and mainly available in the state of Connecticut in the United States
- Steamed clams – clams are steamed according to many different recipes in different regions
- Pearl meatballs - Chinese pork meatballs covered in glutinous rice
- Steamed meatball – a Cantonese dim sum dish

=== Puddings ===
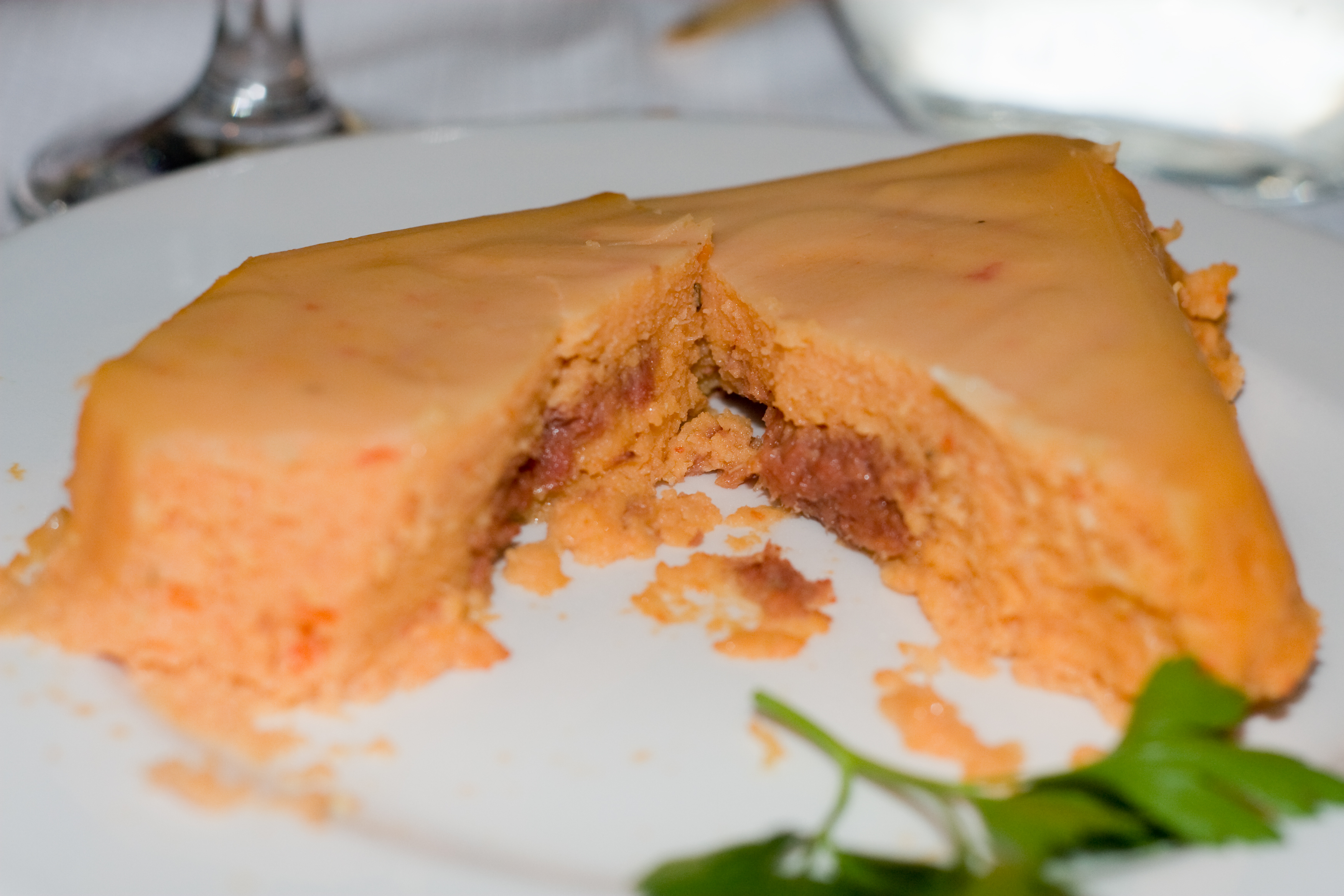
Sliced moin moin

- Cabinet pudding
- Chocolate pudding – a steamed/baked version, texturally similar to cake, is popular in the UK, Ireland, Australia, and New Zealand
- Custard – some custards are prepared by steaming
- Figgy pudding – sometimes cooked by steaming
- Moin moin
- Persimmon pudding
- Steak and kidney pudding
- Sticky toffee pudding
- Suet pudding
  - Christmas pudding
  - Fruit hat (pudding)
  - Jam Roly-Poly
  - Spotted dick – a cylindrical pudding popular in Britain, made with suet and dried fruit (usually currants or raisins) and often served with custard
- Sussex Pond Pudding

=== Rice cakes ===
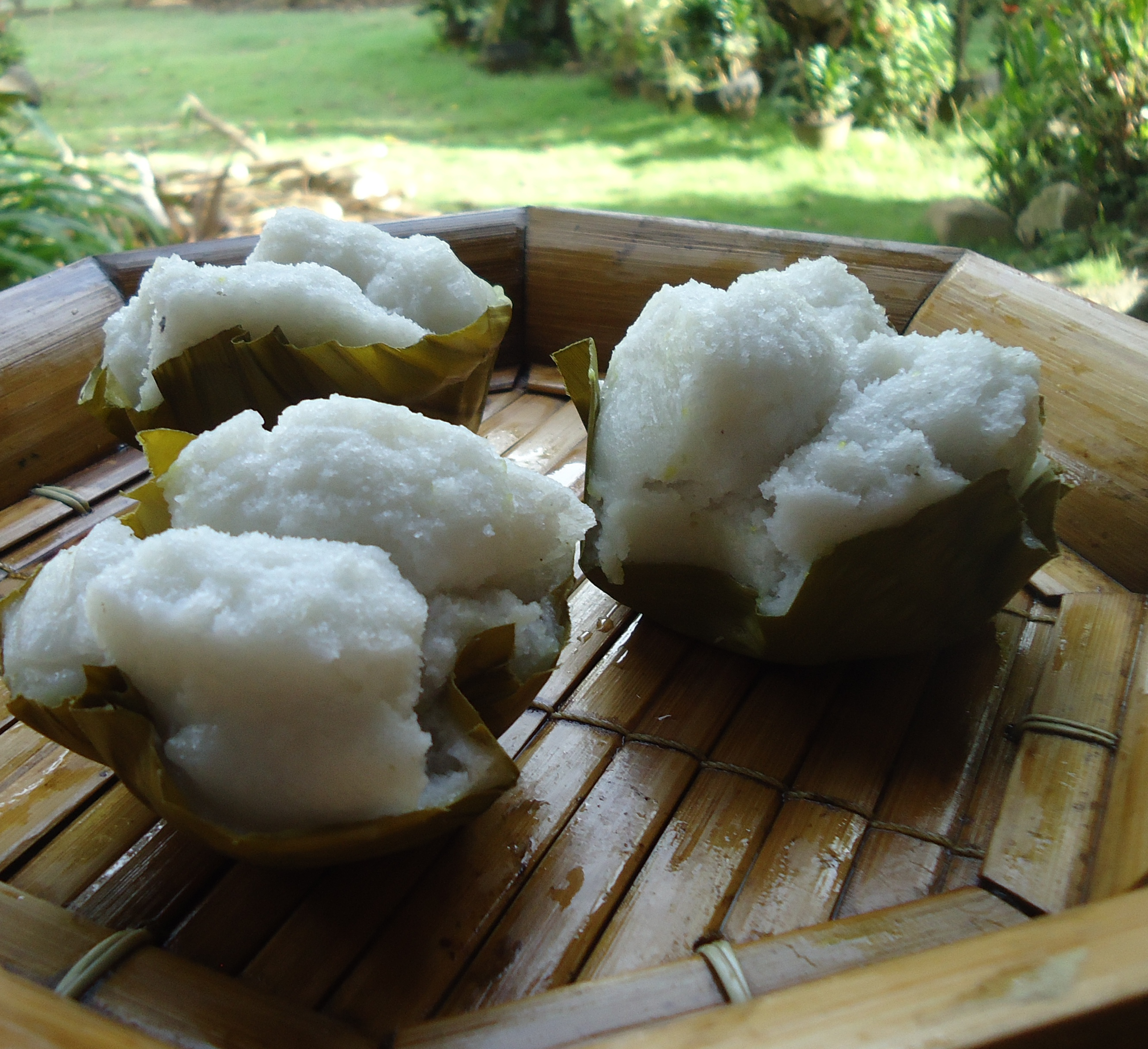
Puto in banana leaves

Some varieties of rice cakes are steamed.

- Bánh chưng
- Chwee kueh – a type of steamed rice cake, common in Singapore and Johor
- Mont-sein-paung – a type of steamed rice cake, sometimes with jaggery added, served with coconut flakes and pounded sesame. Found throughout Myanmar.
- Puto – a type of steamed rice cake in Philippine cuisine derived from Indian puttu of Malayalam origin.
  - Kutsinta – a type of puto found throughout the Philippines
- Bhapa/tekeli pitha – Steamed rice cakes stuffed with grated coconut, jaggery and sesame seeds found throughout Bengal and Assam.
- Sanna
- Suman
- Tteok – also see List of tteok varieties
  - Injeolmi
  - Jeungpyeon
  - Mujigae tteok
  - Sirutteok
  - Songpyeon

== Gallery ==
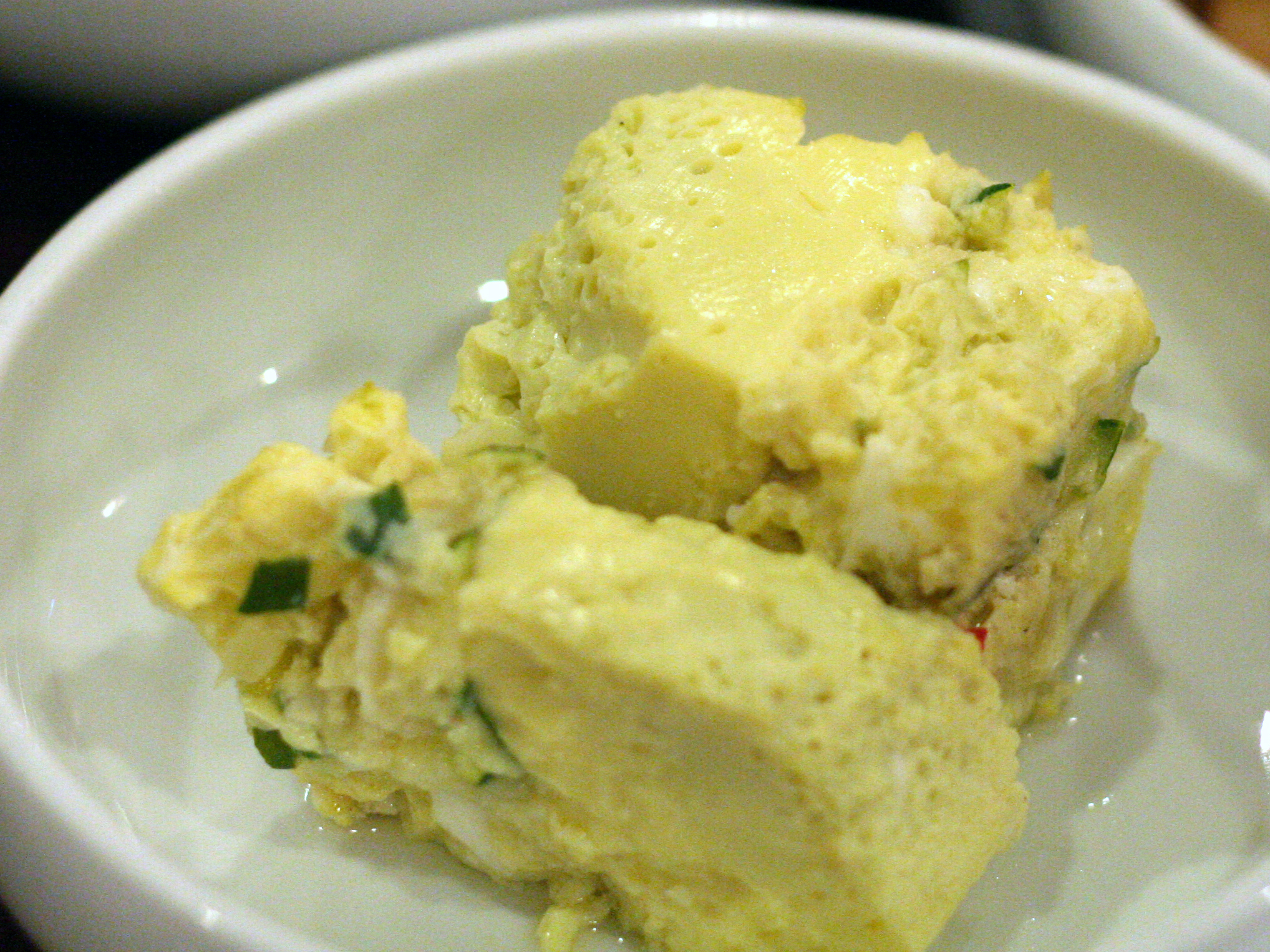
Gyeran jjim

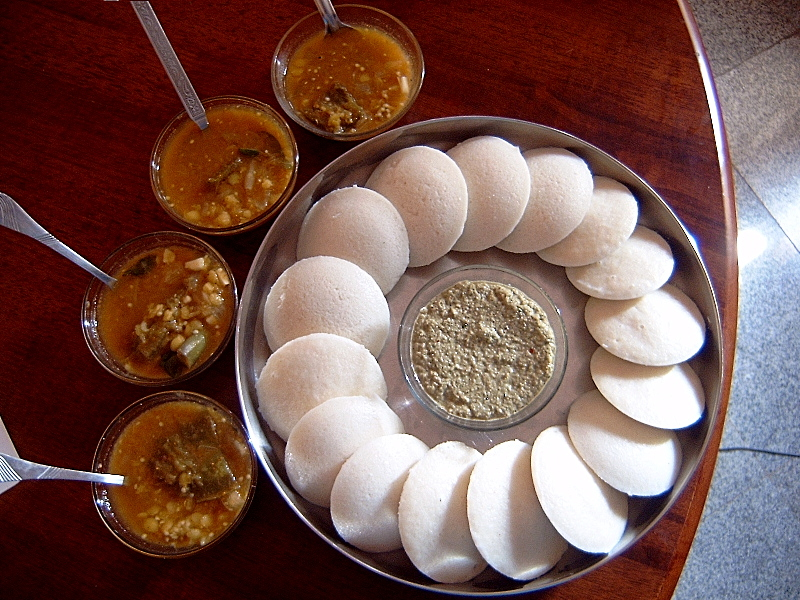
Idli with chutney and sambar

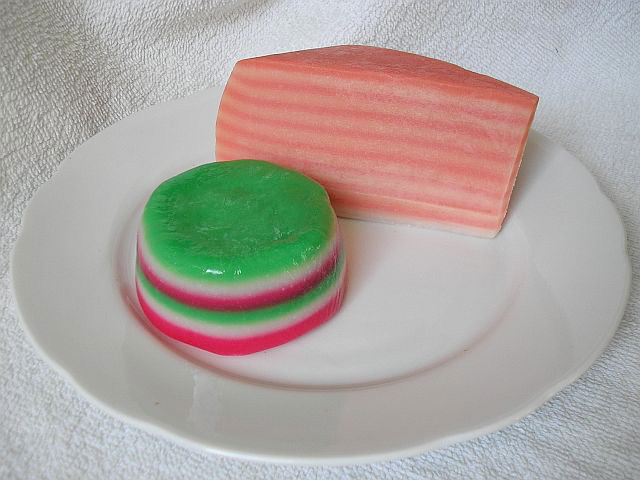
Kue lapis

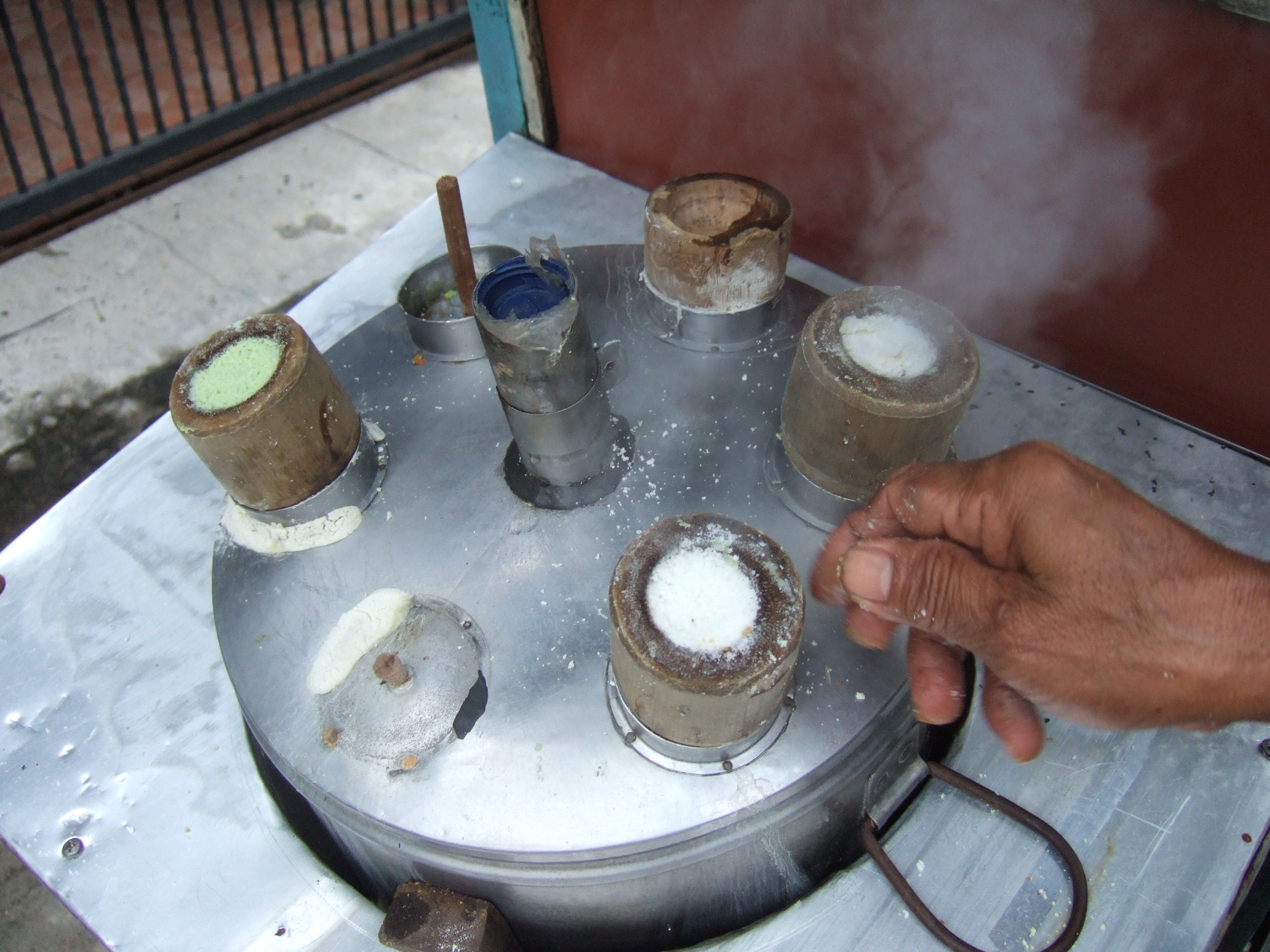
Kue putu being steamed

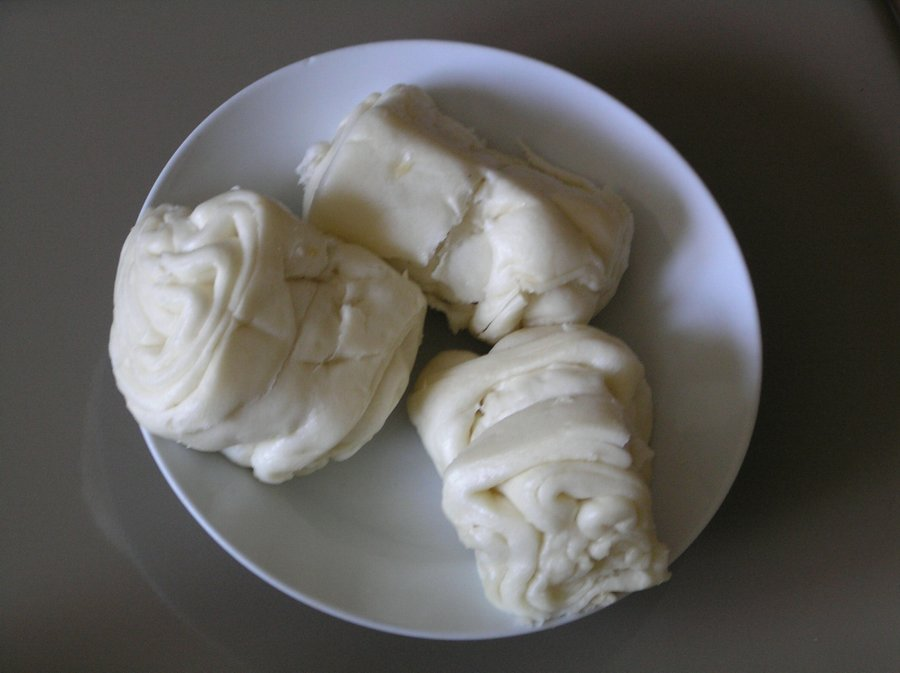
Mandarin rolls

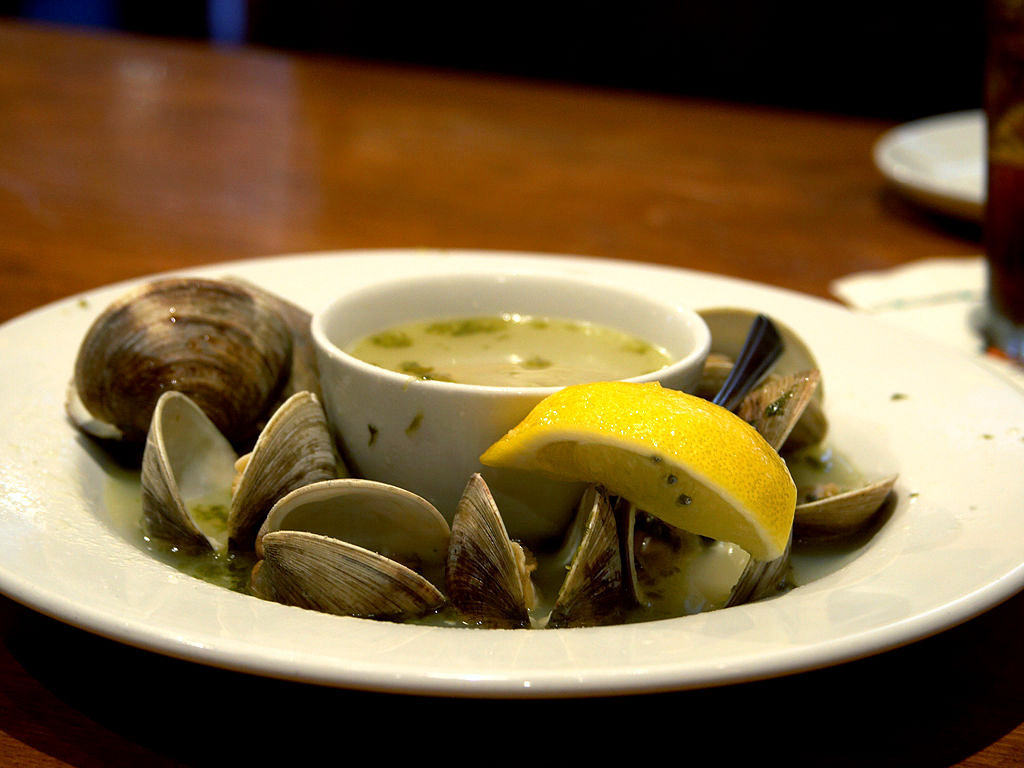
Steamed clams

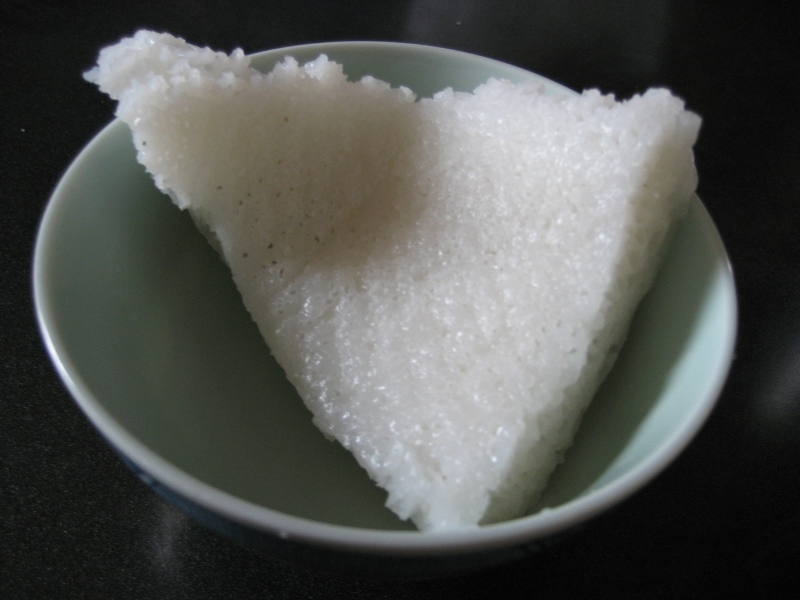
A steamed rice cake

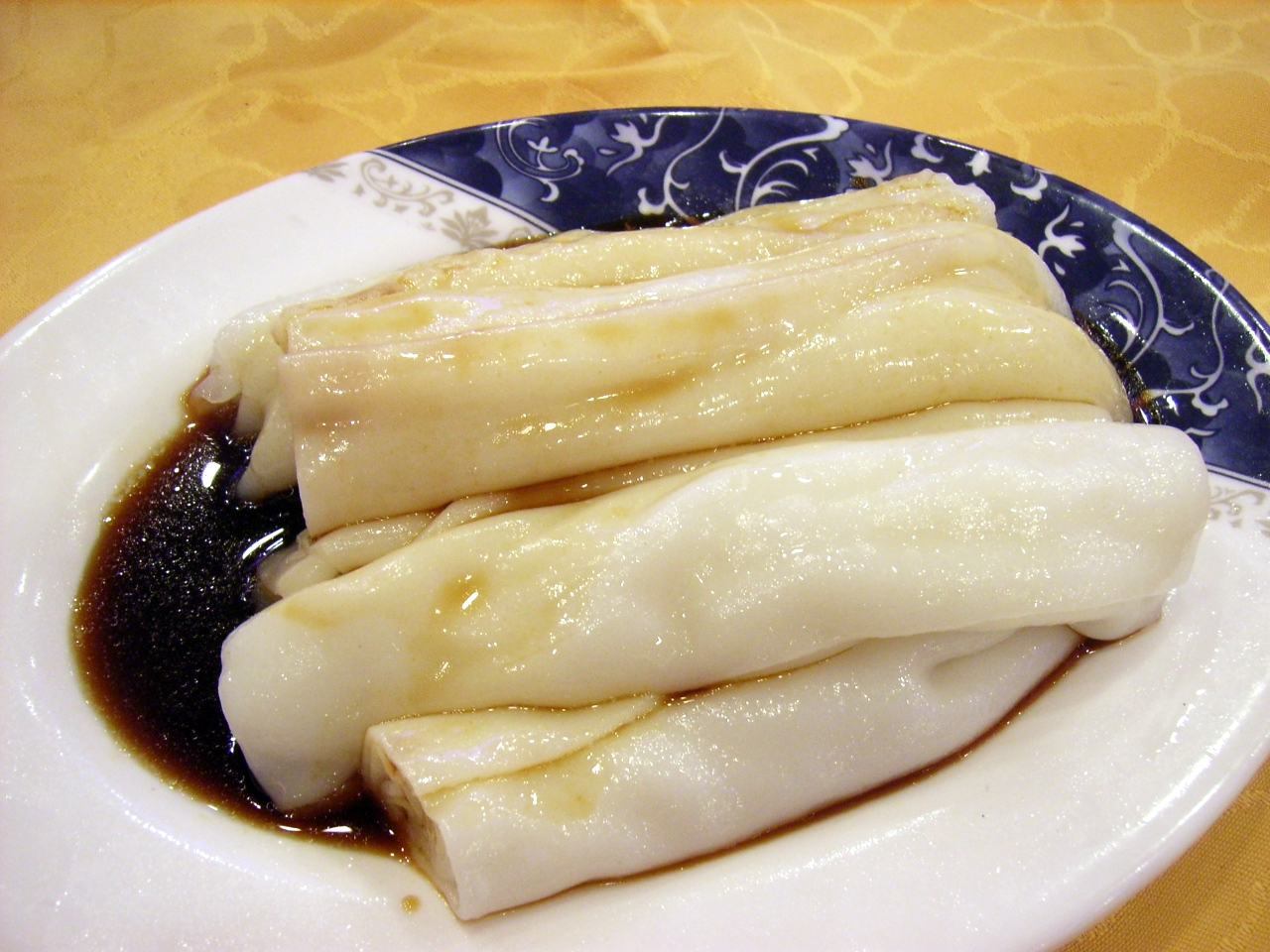
Rice noodle rolls with a sauce

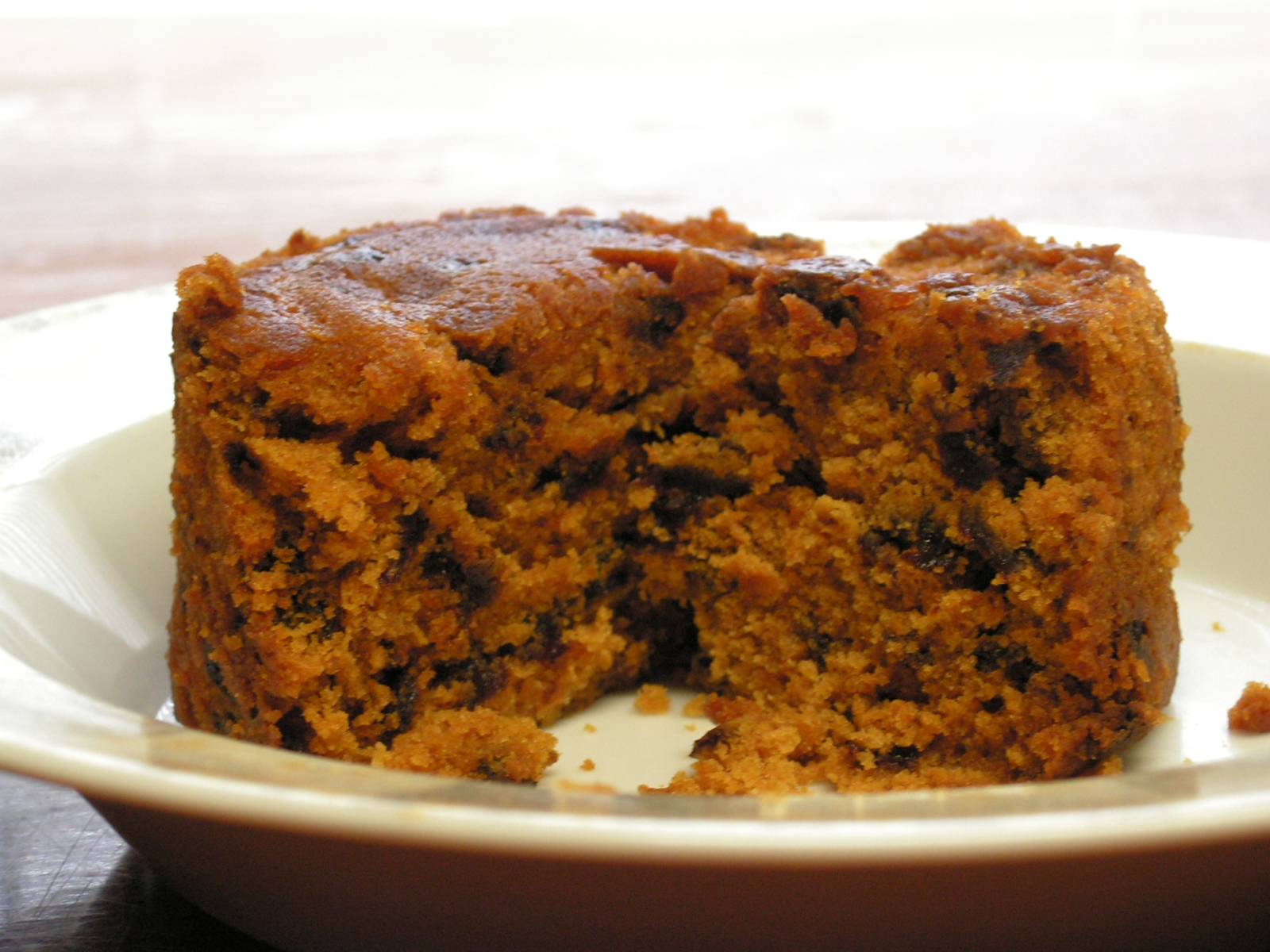
Spotted dick

== See also ==
- Double steaming
- Food steamer
- List of deep fried foods
- List of twice-baked foods
- Pudding basin – a bowl or vessel that is specifically used to steam puddings
