= Wotou =

Northern Chinese steamed cornmeal bread

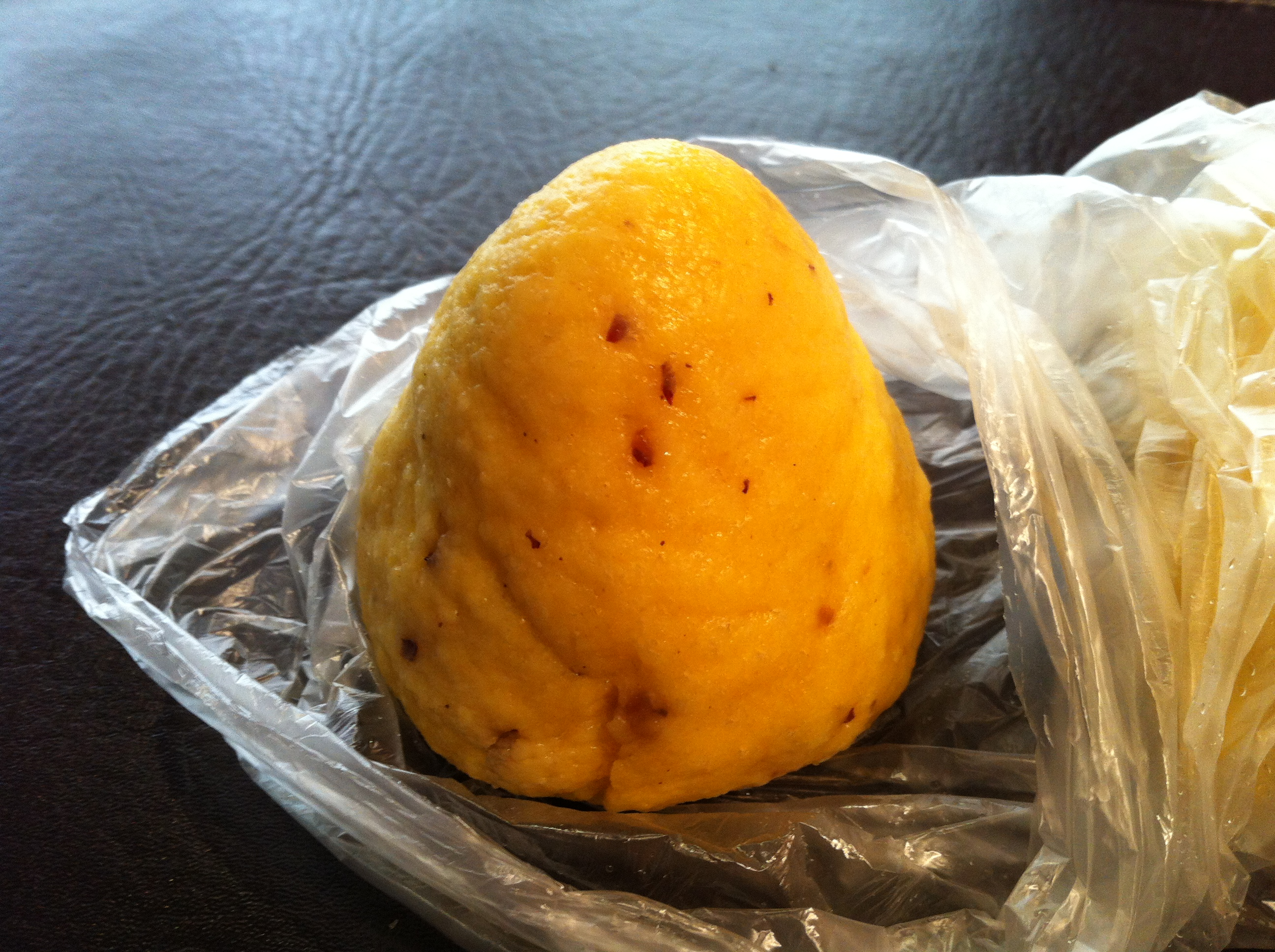
- Alternative names: Steamed corn bread, Wowotou
- Type: Bread
- Place of origin: China
- Region or state: northern China, Beijing
- Main ingredients: Corn flour (or millet flour and soybean flour)

Wotou
- Traditional Chinese: 窩頭
- Simplified Chinese: 窝头
Transcriptions
Standard Mandarin
- Hanyu Pinyin: wō tóu
- Wade–Giles: wo-t'ou

Wotou or wowotou, also called Chinese cornbread, is a type of steamed bread made from cornmeal in Northern China.

== Etymology ==
"Wotou" literally translates to "nest thing", since the wotou resembles a bird's nest with its hollow cone shape.

== History ==
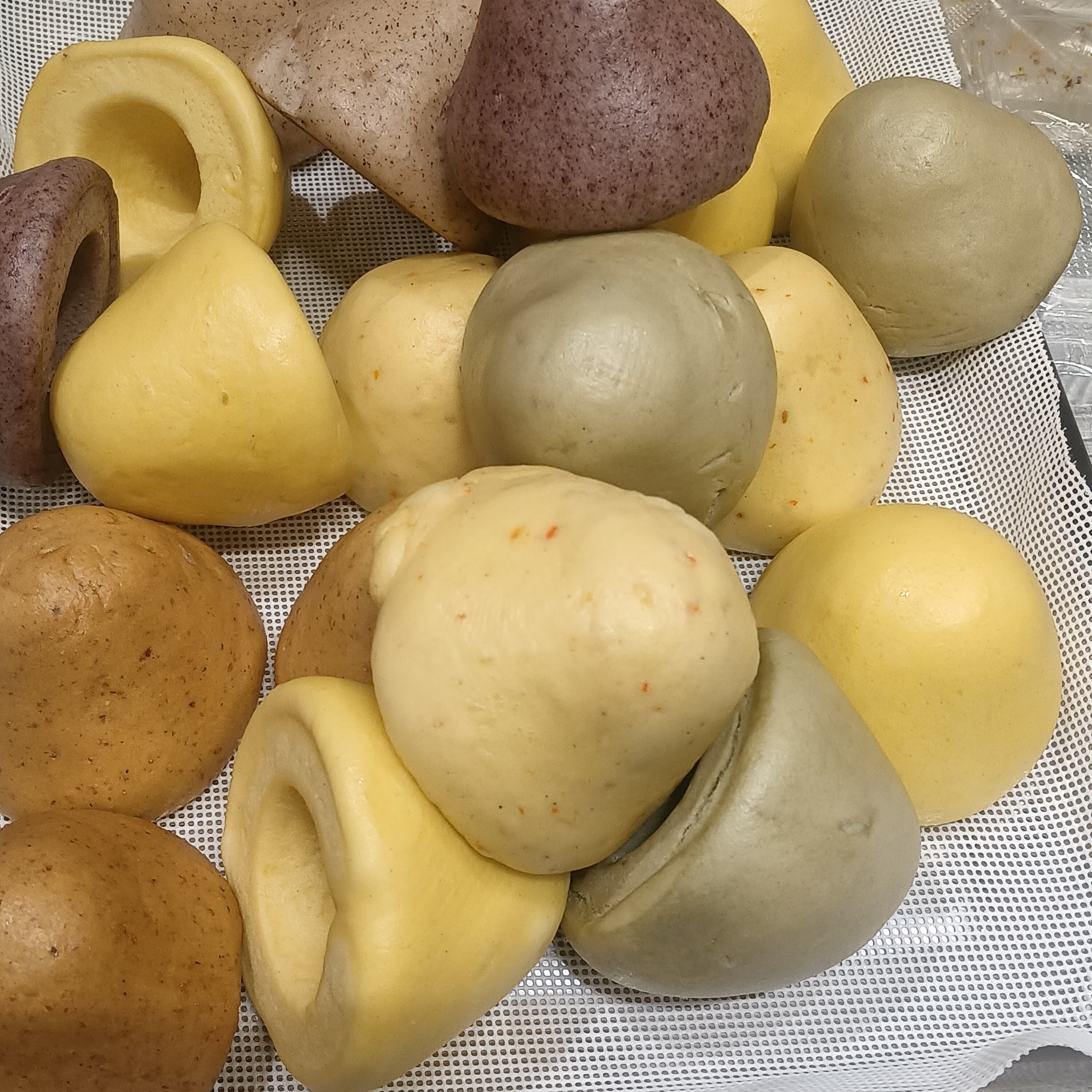

Wōtóu is in the shape of a hollow cone. It was a cheap food for poor people, but a legend grew on how it became a dish served in the Imperial Kitchens. The legend says that during Empress Dowager Cixi's flight to Xi'an from the Battle of Peking (1900) when the Eight-Nation Alliance invaded China in the Boxer Rebellion, Cixi received a bunch of corn buns to satiate her hunger. After her return to Beijing, she ordered the Imperial cooks to make it again for her, and the chef used more refined ingredients to create the golden colored wotou bun, which became one of the Imperial dishes. The full name of the bun was 宮廷小窩頭 (gōngtíng xiǎo wōtóu - the "Royal Wotou"). It has been transformed into a popular food from its previous poor status.

A cake called wowotou was cooked in the same pot as a cabbage after being "slapped on the side", and it was made out of corn-meal and served during the late Qing at Peking University.

According to G. C. L. Howell in his article published in the China Journal of March 1934, The soy bean: A dietary revolution in China, wotou was made out of millet flour at a ratio of 8 to soy flour at 3 or 2 in north China.

Wotou steamed bread would be heavy without soda, so it was lightened by adding some sodium bicarbonate according to the Chinese Economic Journal and Bulletin.

A "conical temple roof" is similar in appearance to the shape of the wotou.

The Chinese Journal of Physiology described an experiment using mixed flour to make the hollow cone shaped wotou steamed bread, with it consisting of 2 parts millet, 2 parts red kaoliang, and 1 part soybean.

It was known as wotou 窩頭, "maize-soybean flour bread." It was also known as wowotou 窩窩頭, "bean-millet bread".

== See also ==
- Baozi
- Dampfnudel
- List of breads
- List of buns
- List of steamed foods
- Mandarin roll
- Mantı
- Mantou
