= Leaf wrap =

Leaf wrap or leafwrap is a term for various foods that are wrapped in leaves:

- Lo mai gai, a Cantonese leaf-wrapped dim sum
- Ssam, a Korean dish of various fillings wrapped in leafy vegetables
- Zongzi, a Chinese dish of rice and various fillings wrapped in leaves

== See also ==
- Sushi, a Japanese dish of rice and various fillings wrapped in leaf-like seaweed
