= Pudding bowl =

Pudding bowl may refer to

- Pudding basin
- Bowl cut
