= Qatlama =

Flatbread from Turkish and Central Asian cuisines

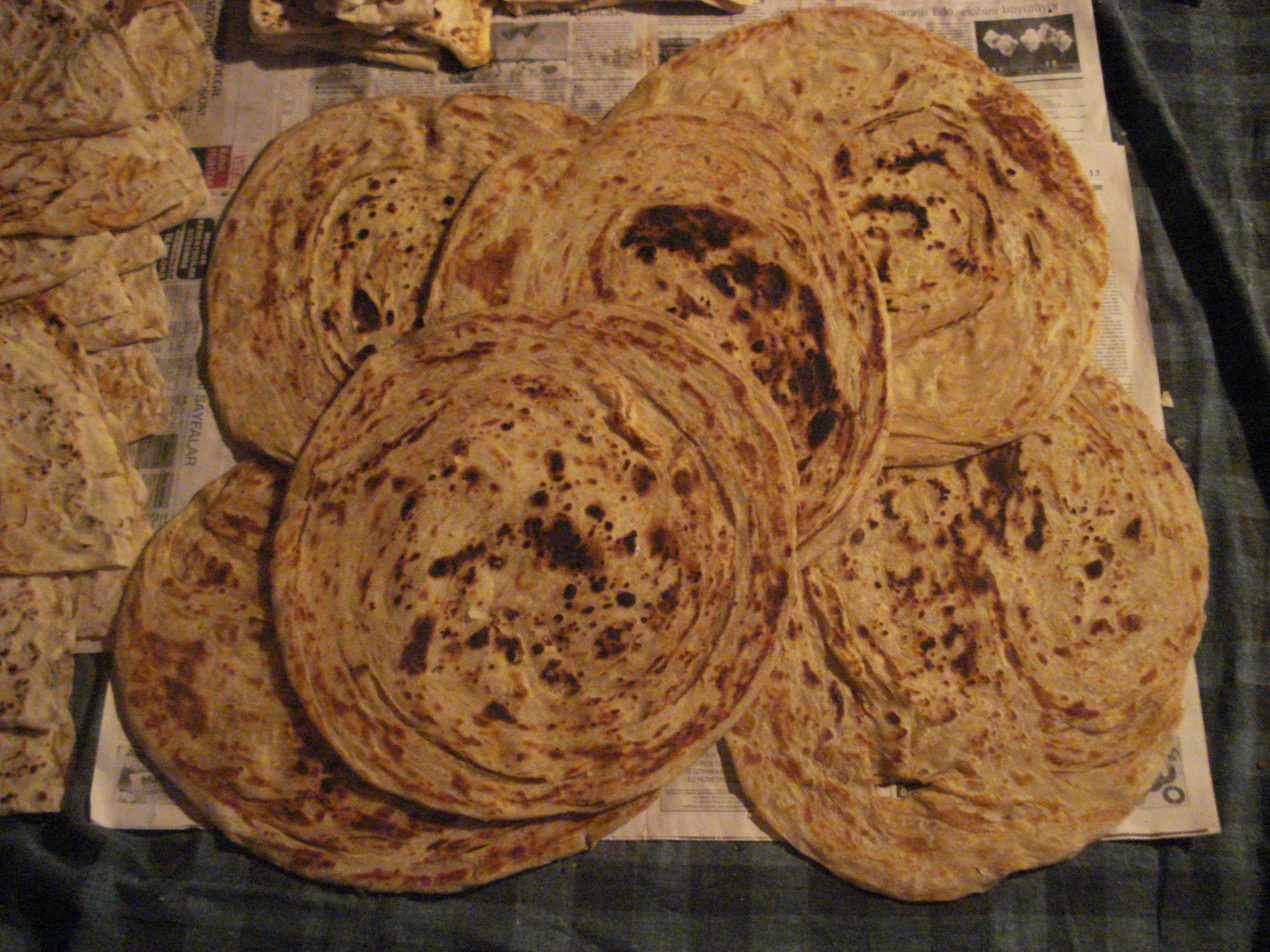
- Alternative names: Qattama, katmer, katma, gambir
- Type: Flatbread
- Course: Side dish, dessert
- Region or state: Turkey, Central Asia, South Asia (mainly Pakistan)

Qatlama (Urdu: قتلمہ, romanized: qatlamā, both pronounced [qɑtlɑmɑ]), qattama, katlama, kattama, (Kazakh: қаттама, romanized: qattama; Kyrgyz: каттама, both pronounced [qɑttɑmɑ]), katmer (Turkish: katmer), katma (Bulgarian: катма), qator, gambir (Mongolian: гамбир, pronounced [ɢæmʲbʲĭɾ]) is a fried layered bread common in the cuisines of Central Asia, Pakistan and Turkey.

== Etymology ==
The word katlama in Turkic languages means "folded", which comes from the verb katlamak "to fold", likely referring to the traditional method of preparation.

== Varieties ==
=== Pakistan ===
Lahori qatlama (قتلمہ) is a savory Pakistani flatbread. It is served around the world in Pakistani restaurants.

==== Preparation ====
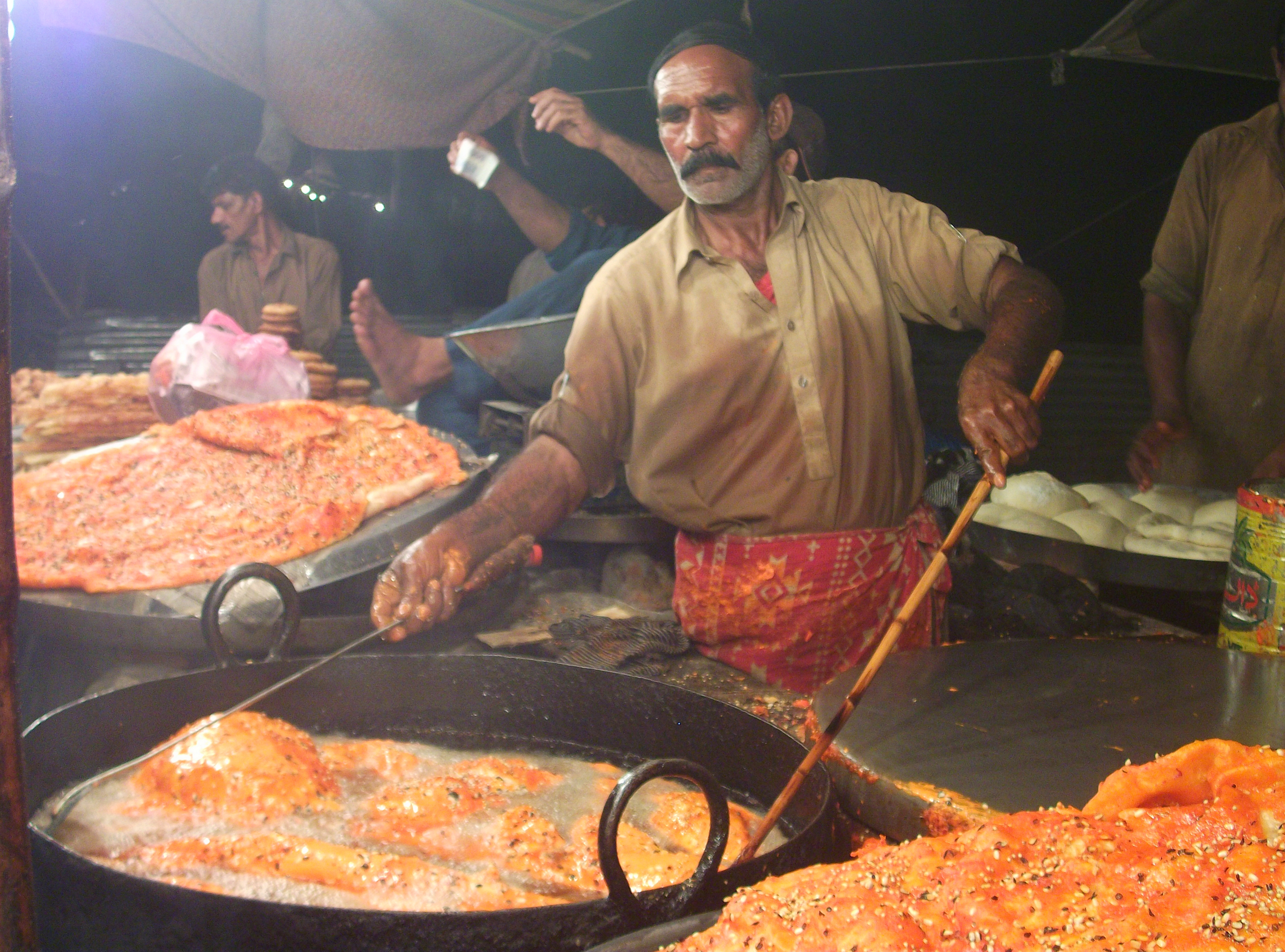
Qatlama making, Mela Chiraghan, Lahore

It is made with dough mixed with powdered red chilli peppers, garam masala (a hot spice blend) and red food coloring. Small balls of this dough are sprinkled with mashed urad dal, coriander and anar dana, rolled out and then deep-fried. Sometimes before frying, it is also covered with besan (chickpea flour).

In many places around Pakistan, qatlama has a yeast-based dough and is topped with spiced minced beef or lamb. This variety differs from the vegan dish primarily served in the eastern city of Lahore.

=== Turkey ===
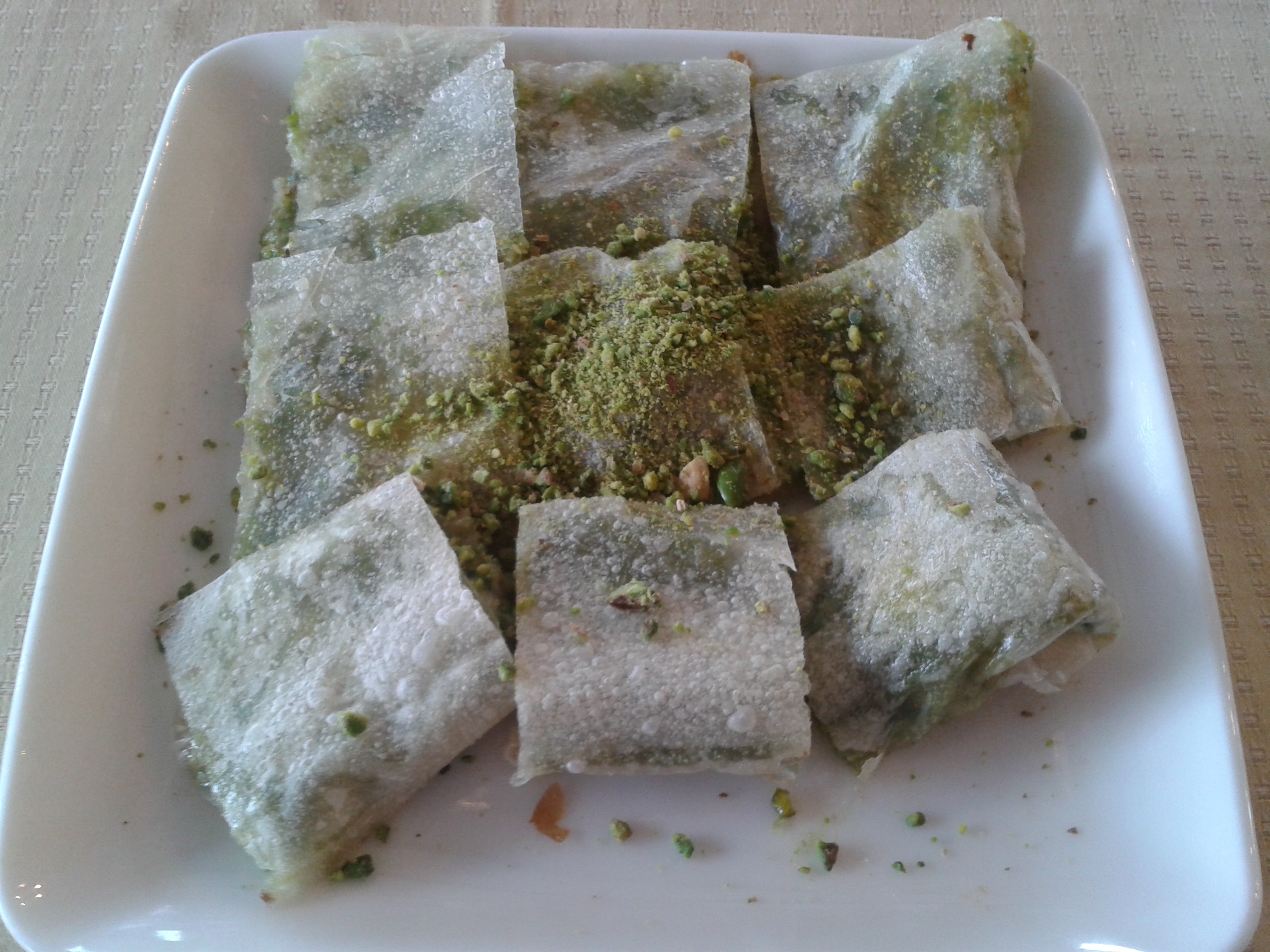
Turkish katmer

The Turkish variety katmer is made as a dessert with kaymak (clotted cream), and like many other delicacies from Gaziantep, is also filled and topped with pistachios.

==== Regional katmer styles ====
- Sivas katmeri
- Antep katmeri
- Kilis katmeri

== See also ==
- Cong you bing
- Huajuan
- Paratha
