= Lo mai gai =

Cantonese leaf-wrapped dim sum

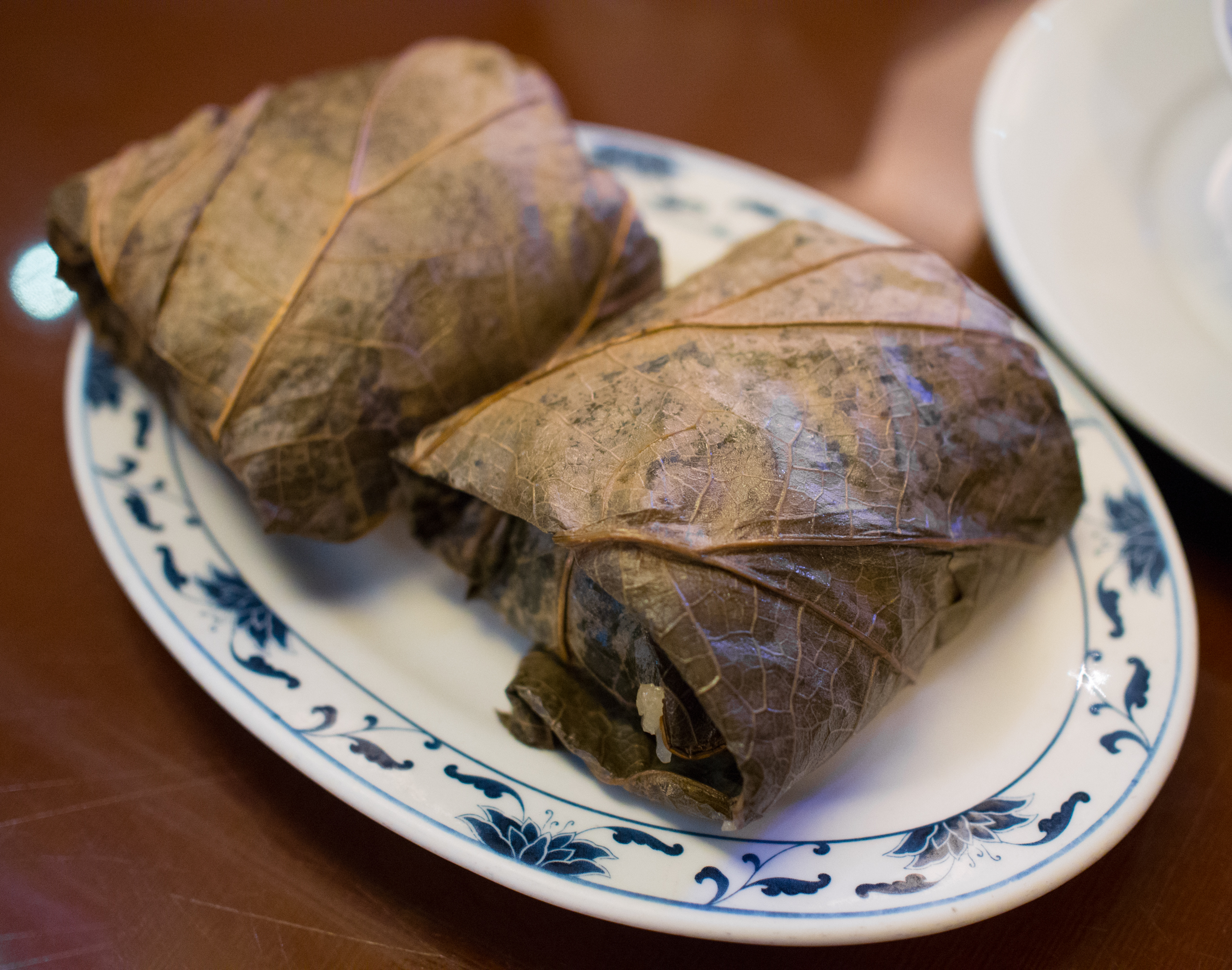
- Lotus leaf wrap
- Alternative names: Nuomiji
- Course: Dim sum
- Place of origin: China
- Region or state: Guangdong, cantonese-speaking areas
- Main ingredients: Glutinous rice filled with chicken, Chinese mushrooms, Chinese sausage, scallions and dried shrimp
- Variations: Zongzi, lotus leaf wrap

Lo mai gai
- Traditional Chinese: 糯米雞
- Simplified Chinese: 糯米鸡
- Jyutping: no6 mai5 gai1
- Hanyu Pinyin: nuòmǐjī
- Literal meaning: glutinous rice with chicken
Transcriptions
Standard Mandarin
- Hanyu Pinyin: nuòmǐjī
Yue: Cantonese
- Yale Romanization: noh mái gāi
- Jyutping: no6 mai5 gai1

Jan jyu gai
- Traditional Chinese: 珍珠雞
- Simplified Chinese: 珍珠鸡
- Jyutping: zan1 zyu1 gai1
- Hanyu Pinyin: zhēnzhūjī
- Literal meaning: pearl chicken
Transcriptions
Standard Mandarin
- Hanyu Pinyin: zhēnzhūjī
Yue: Cantonese
- Yale Romanization: jān jyū gāi
- Jyutping: zan1 zyu1 gai1

Lo mai gai (Note: While proper Cantonese pronunciation specifies that "lo" should have an initial n- sound, free variation of n- and l- in many Cantonese speakers results in l- being the more commonly seen spelling for this word.) (Chinese: 糯米雞; Jyutping: no6 mai5 gai1; Cantonese Yale: noh mái gāi), literally "glutinous rice chicken", is a classic dim sum dish served during yum cha. The portion size of lo mai gai is generally quite large, so there is a smaller variant created known as jan ju gai (Chinese: 珍珠雞; Jyutping: zan1 zyu1 gai1; Cantonese Yale: jān jyū gāi; lit. 'pearl chicken').

== Description ==
Lo mai gai contains glutinous rice filled with chicken, Chinese mushrooms, Chinese sausage, scallions, and sometimes dried shrimp or salted egg. The ball of rice is then wrapped in a re-hydrated lotus leaf and steamed.

== Gallery ==
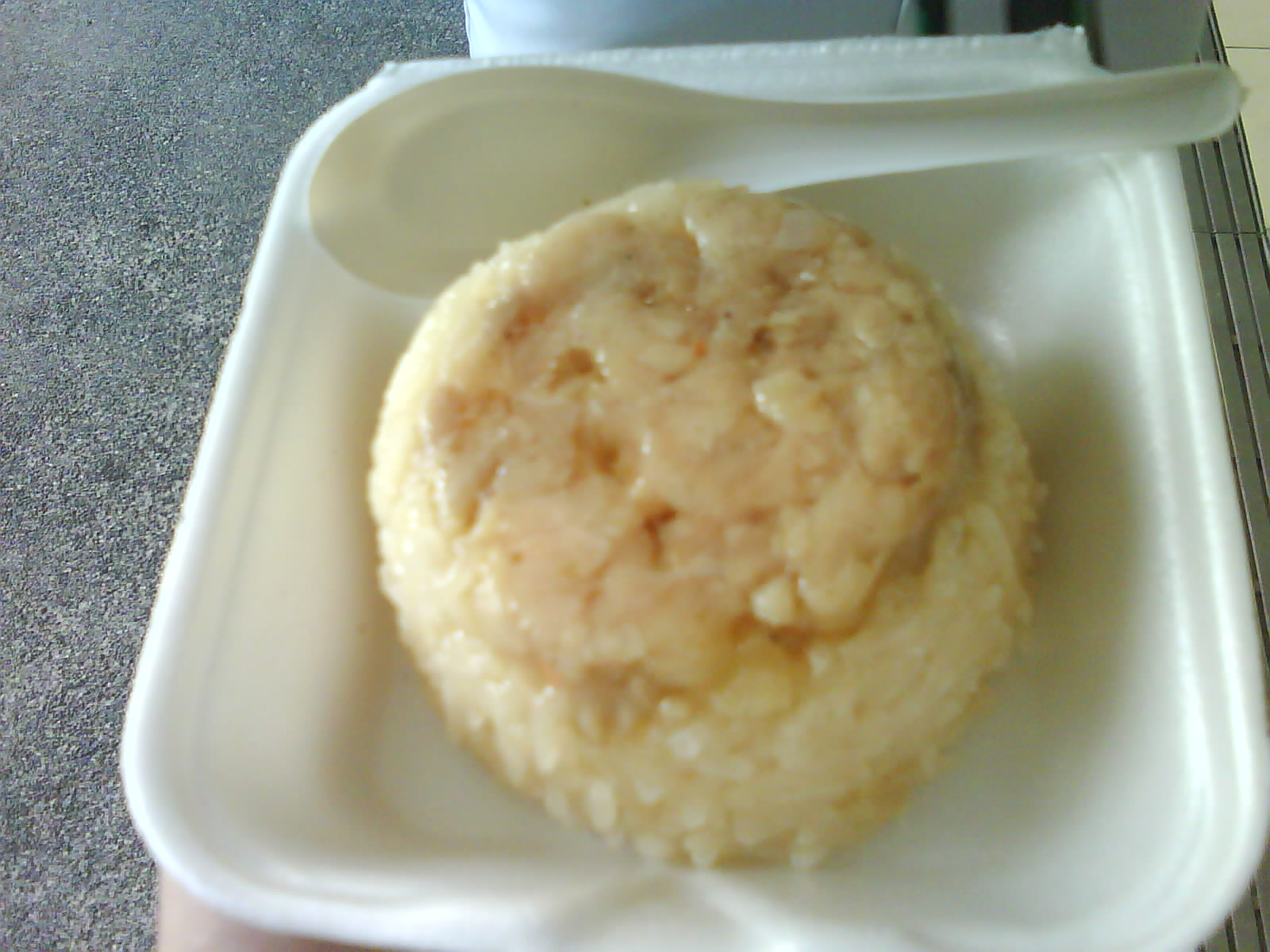
The takeaway style of lo mai gai (usually served in a small bowl)

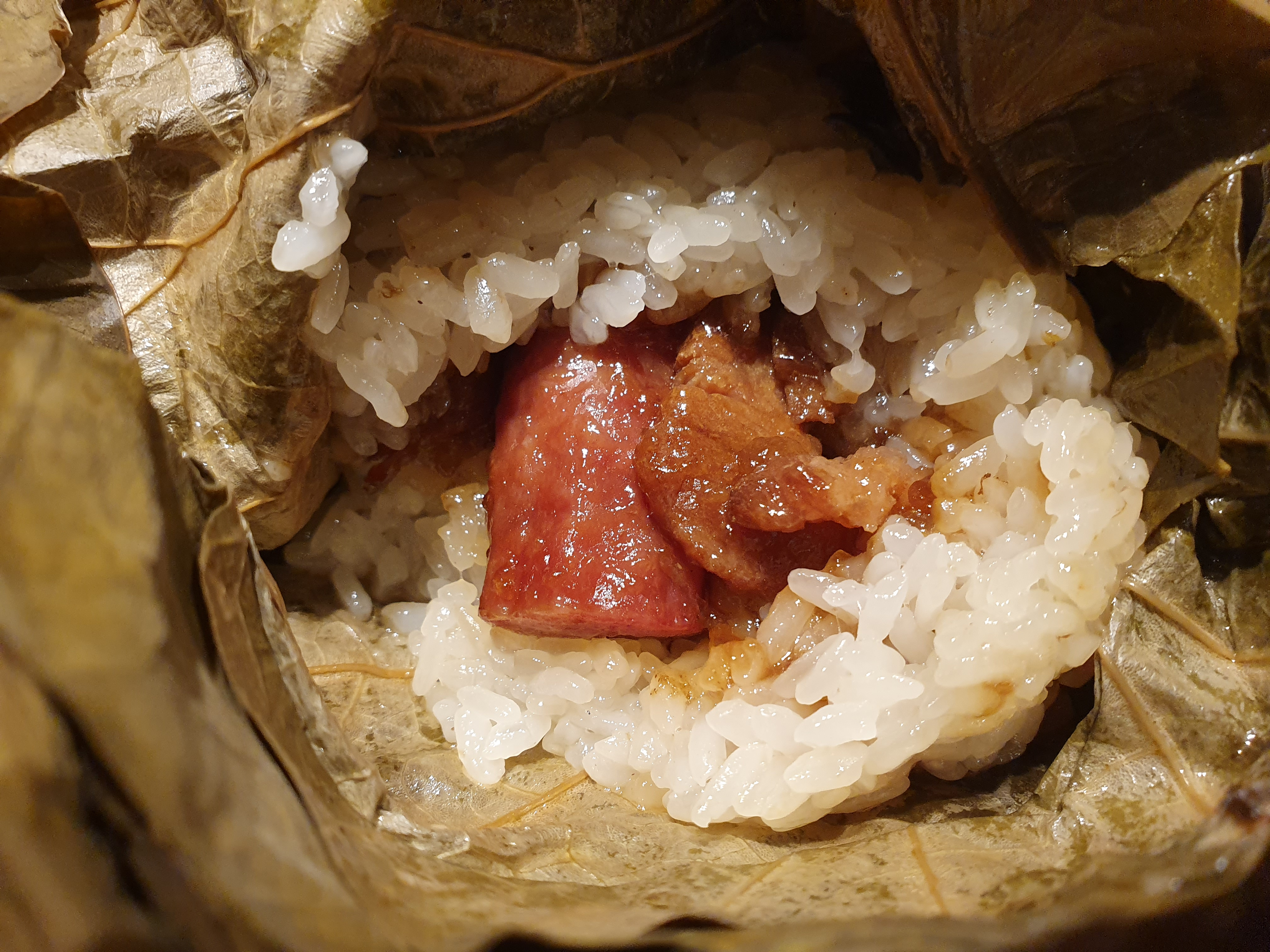
Lo mai gai with Chinese sausage

== See also ==
- Bánh chưng
- Bánh tét
- Bánh tẻ
- Chinese sticky rice
- Corunda
- Hallaca
- Otak-otak
- Pamonha
- Pasteles
- Suman
- Tamale
- Zongzi
