= Fruit hat (pudding) =

- Type: Pudding
- Place of origin: United Kingdom
- Main ingredients: Suet or butter, flour, fruit

Fruit hat is the generic name for a British steamed pudding, originally made with a pastry of suet and flour, and filled with fruit. Later, the term came to refer to a category of steamed puddings "made with butter, flour and eggs produce a sponge-like pud topped with sauce that can be put into the base of the bowl and cooked with the pudding... so the sauce melds with the sponge to produce a deliciously gunky top: the 'fruit hat'."

== See also ==
- List of steamed foods
- Upside-down cake
