= Bánh tẻ =

Vietnamese steamed rice cakes

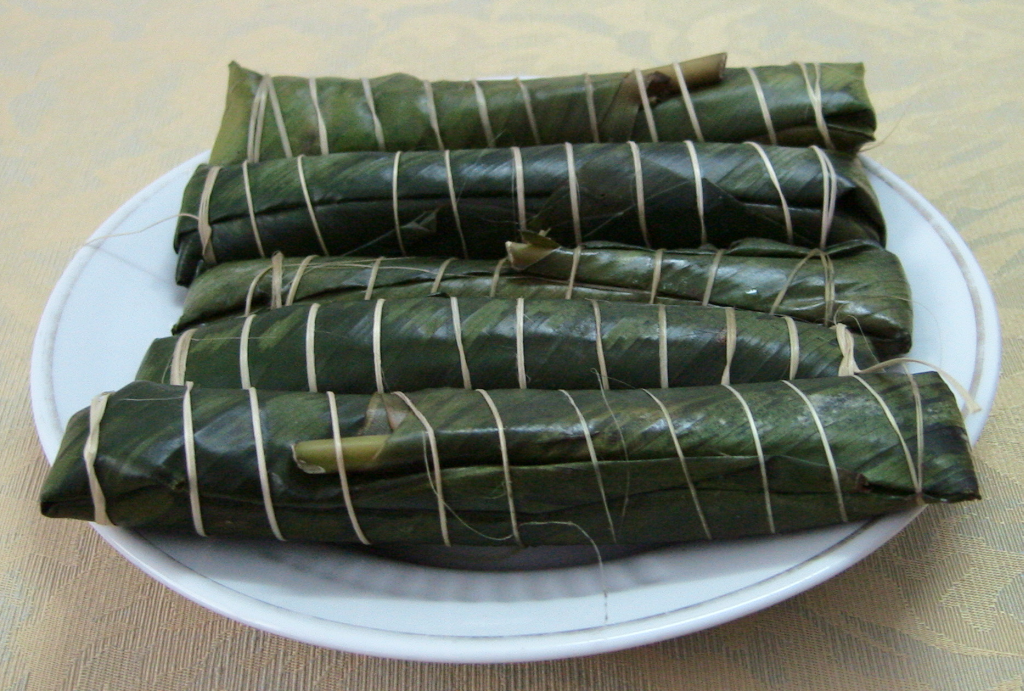
- Wrapped bánh tẻ
- Alternative names: Bánh răng bừa
- Place of origin: Red River Delta region, Vietnam
- Region or state: Northern Vietnam
- Main ingredients: Plain (non-glutinous) white rice, minced pork shoulder, Judas's ear fungus (Auricularia auricula-judae), onion, salt, pepper

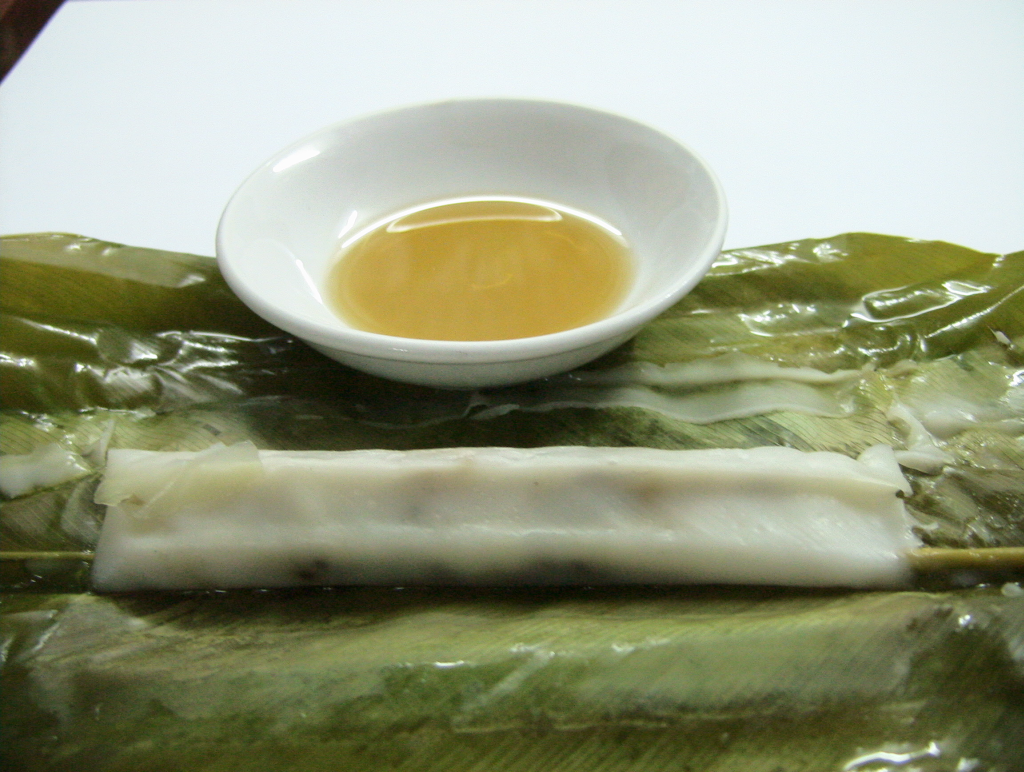
Bánh tẻ that have been unwrapped

Bánh tẻ (literally "rice cakes" in Vietnamese; also called bánh răng bừa) is a variety of small steamed rice cake in Vietnamese cuisine. It is a traditional variety of bánh from the Red River Delta region of northern Vietnam. Bánh tẻ are made of rice flour, wrapped with lá dong leaves into a long, thin cylindrical shape, and boiled thoroughly.

Bánh tẻ is considered one of the most typical dishes of Hanoi, although it may also be found in other parts of the country. The flavors and ingredients of bánh tẻ vary from region to region.

== Ingredients ==
Bánh tẻ are made of plain (non-glutinous) white rice (called gạo tẻ in Vietnamese), minced pork shoulder, Judas's ear fungus (Auricularia auricula-judae), onion, salt, pepper. Some variants of bánh tẻ include peanuts and chopped shiitake mushrooms.

== Making ==
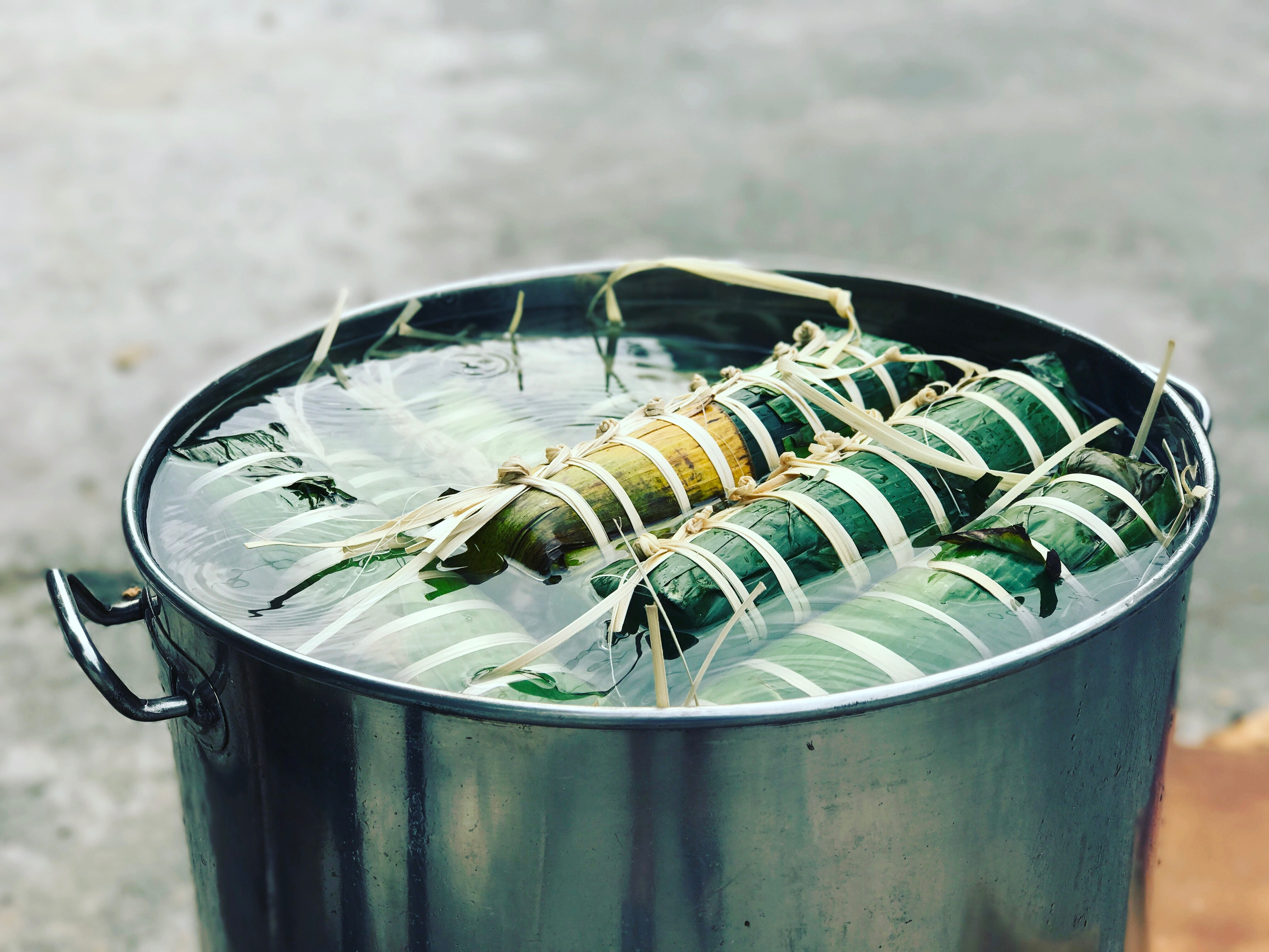
Boiled bánh tẻ

In order to make bánh tẻ, rice is first soaked in water until it is soft enough, then it is ground by hand with a grindstone to turn rice into a thick or watery mixture of water and rice powder. This mixture is cooked to a temperature above 50 degrees Celsius (but not to boiling) while it is stirred for 3 hours until it reaches the consistency of thick slurry.

For the filling, pork, onion, and shiitake mushrooms are finely minced and combined.

To compose the dish, a layer of rice paste is layered onto a leaf, followed by a layer of filling, and then another layer of rice paste. The final bánh is then wrapped with the leaves tied with thread or string, forming slender cylinder. The last step involves steaming the bánh tẻ for 20 minutes until fully cooked.

== Serving ==
Bánh tẻ are served with nước mắm (fish sauce) and sprinkled with black pepper. Unlike some varieties of bánh, which are prepared only seasonally or for particular festivals, bánh tẻ are made all year round.

== See also ==
- Bánh
- Bánh chưng
- Bánh tét
- Corunda
- Hallaca
- Lo mai gai
- Pamonha
- Pasteles
- Suman
- Tamale
- Zongzi
