= Chinese sticky rice =

Chinese rice dish commonly made from glutinous rice

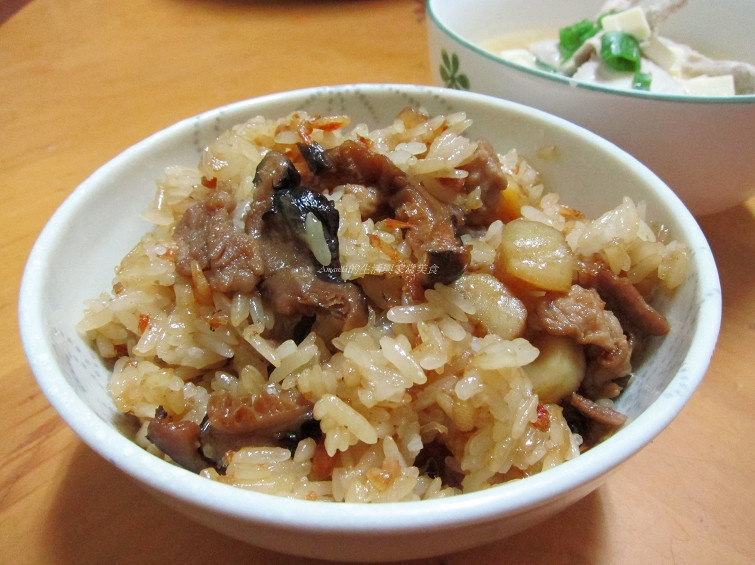
Chinese sticky rice in Taiwan

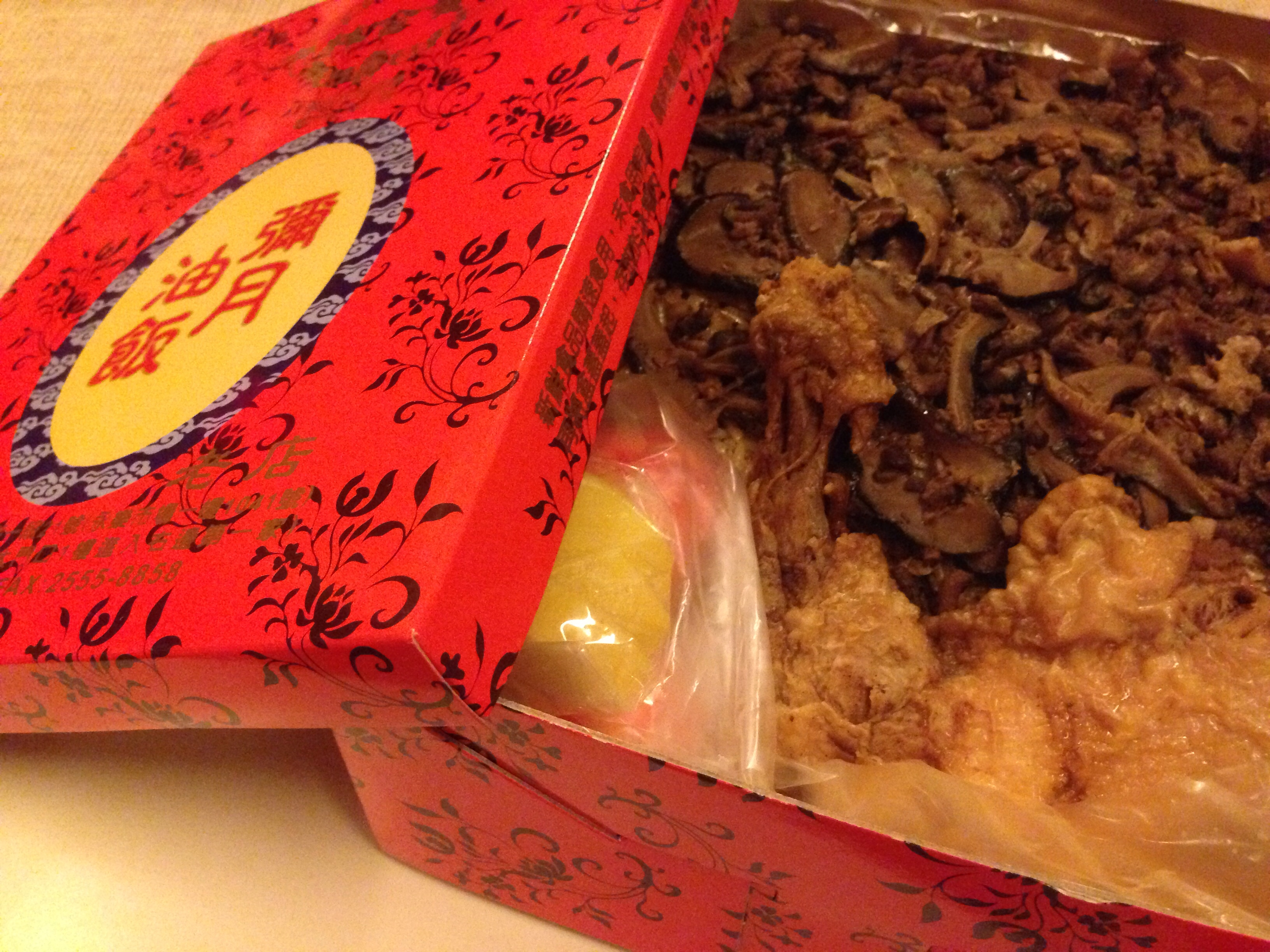
Chinese sticky rice in Taiwan

Chinese sticky rice (Chinese: 糯米飯; pinyin: nuòmǐ fàn) is a Chinese and Taiwanese rice dish commonly made from glutinous rice that can include soy sauce, oyster sauce, scallions, cilantro and other ingredients. It is a common dish in Guangdong and Hong Kong. As it is commonly thought in Cantonese cuisine traditions that glutinous rice has a warming effect on the stomach, this dish is especially popular during the autumn and winter seasons. It is also frequently served as part of a set meal with snake soup.

Authentic stir-fried glutinous rice is somewhat similar to the preparation of risotto, as it involves stir-frying uncooked rice directly. Preparing this dish requires considerable time and effort. The glutinous rice must first be soaked in water overnight, and all excess water must be thoroughly drained before cooking. The other ingredients are stir-fried first and then set aside. The rice is then stir-fried slowly in a wok, with water added gradually in small amounts during the process—too much water at once would result in boiling rather than stir-frying, making the rice overly soft. Seasonings and pre-cooked ingredients are only added near the end. Achieving the ideal texture—neither too hard nor too soft—requires careful attention and a lengthy stir-frying process.

Because preparing authentic stir-fried glutinous rice is time-consuming, many restaurants, for the sake of cost and efficiency, choose not to stir-fry raw glutinous rice directly. Instead, they pre-steam the rice in advance. When a customer places an order, the pre-steamed glutinous rice is quickly stir-fried in the wok together with the other ingredients. This method significantly reduces the preparation time. However, the appearance and texture of stir-fried glutinous rice made from raw rice versus pre-steamed rice are not exactly the same.

== Common ingredients and seasonings ==
- Peanut
- Cured meat
- Traditional Chinese sausages
- Shiitake
- Eggs
- Shrimp or prawns
- Conpoy
- Allium fistulosum
- Soy sauce
- Sugar

== See also ==
- Lo mai gai, sticky rice with savory fillings wrapped in lotus leaves
- Zongzi, sticky rice with sweet or savory fillings, typically wrapped in bamboo leaves
