= Steamed bread =

Bread made by steaming, not baking

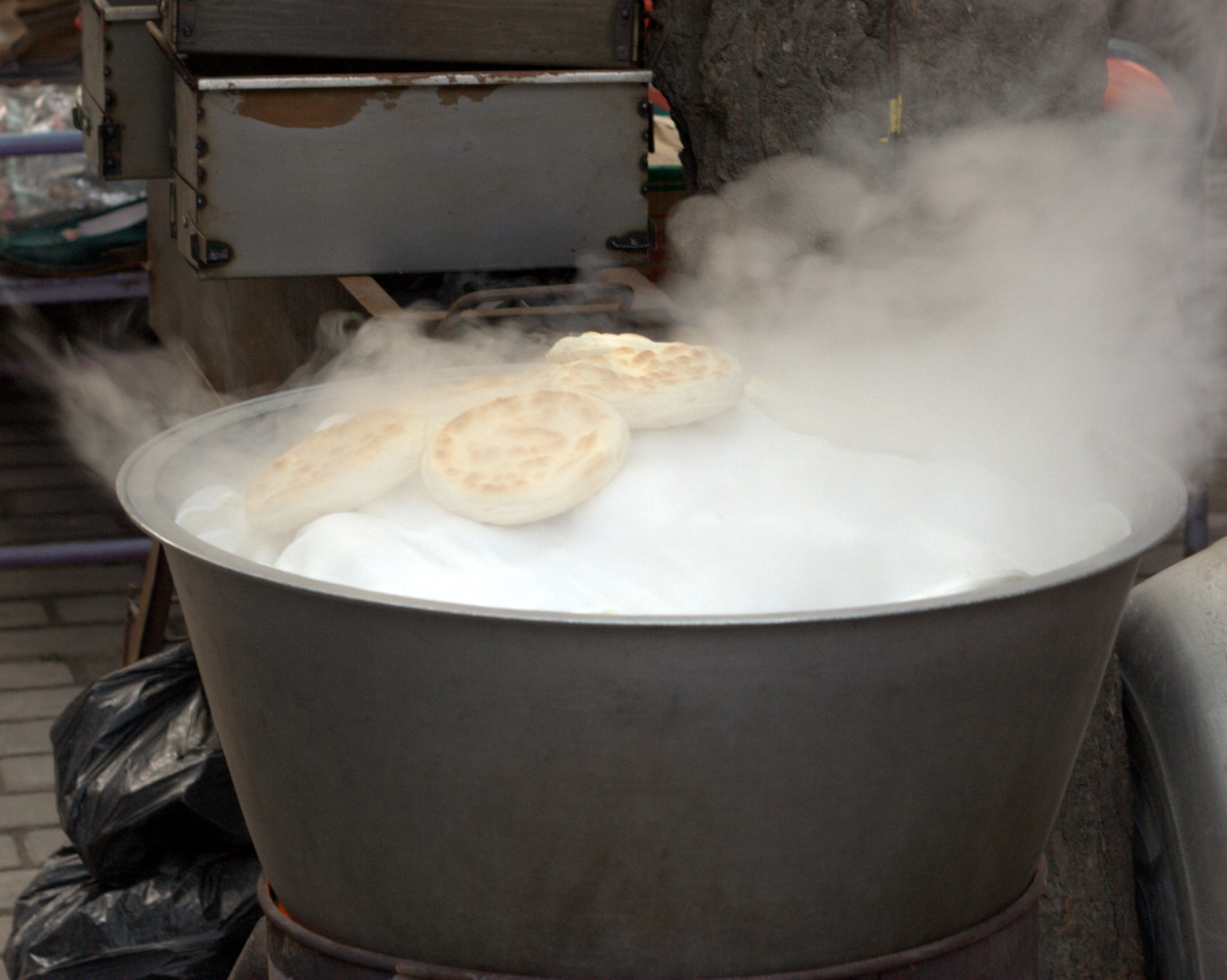
- Steaming bread in Xi'an's Muslim Quarter
- Type: Bread
- Main ingredients: Wheat flour
- Variations: Boston brown bread, mantou

Steamed bread is a kind of bread, typically made from wheat, that is prepared by steaming instead of baking. Steamed bread is produced and consumed all around the world. In Chinese cuisine, mantou is a staple food of northern China, where up to 70% of flour production in the region is used to make it. There are now many variations of mantou in China, for example wholemeal mantou, milk mantou, and sweet potato mantou. Wotou and lotus leaf bread are other steamed bread varieties found in China. Tingmo is a steamed bread in Tibetan cuisine. In Korea, jjinppang means "steamed bread" and is a category of steamed bun filled with sweet or savoury fillings. In Europe there are a number of traditional steamed breads, such as knedla in Slovakia. In South African cuisine, a number of groups produce steamed bread, such as the Zulu ujeqe which can be eaten alone or with tomato soup. South African steamed breads are typically made at home for consumption on the same day, but research on commercial production continues to advance, aided by earlier developments in the mass production of Chinese steamed bread. In the cuisine of the United States, one example of steamed bread is Boston brown bread.

The South African variety known as ujeqe is prepared by having the bread steam in its own fluids. While all steamed breads undergo this process to some degree, ujeqe is especially sealed off from external steam and is not allowed to lose its moisture in the cooking process. As a result, the very fibres of the bread have moisture sealed within them. Subsequently, ujeqe is also known to spoil quickly for that very reason. The bread is marked by a distinct golden skin (or thin crust). Ingredients typically include wheat flour, sugar, salt, yeast, and water. Oil is unnecessary as the bread retains its moisture for days, and would typically spoil first before drying out. This also makes ujeqe suitable for low calorie/low fat diets. Maize meal is sometimes added to the dough for a fuller texture.

== See also ==
- List of steamed foods
- Pumpernickel, the dark German bread made from rye and cooked in a low-heat, steam-filled oven
- Dampfnudel, a light German bread cooked in a pan of shallow steaming water
