= Lucky tattie =

Scottish confection

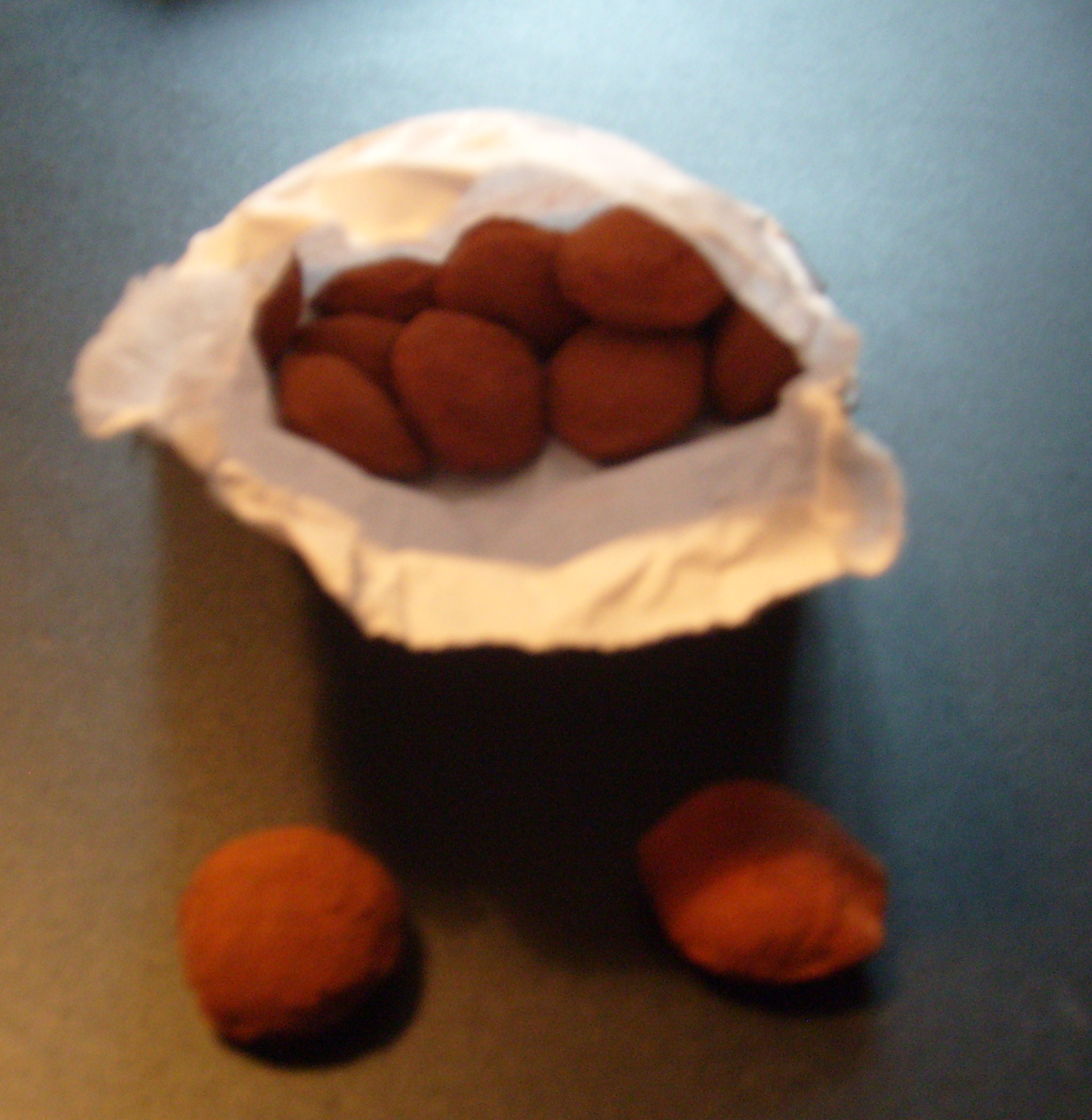
- Bag of lucky tatties
- Course: Confectionery
- Place of origin: Scotland
- Main ingredients: Icing sugar, white fondant, cinnamon powder

The Lucky Tattie is a type of traditional sweet made in Scotland. The lucky tattie is made of a white fondant solid core flavoured with cassia, and steamed and covered with cinnamon powder. The tattie used to contain a small plastic lucky charm in the centre (like a tiny animal or toy), hence the lucky. Due to health and safety concerns they were removed.

== See also ==
- List of steamed foods
