= Dombolo =

South African traditional steamed bread

Dombolo (also known as umbhako, ujeqe, dipapata in Setswana and rostile in Xhosa) is a traditional South African steamed bread. It is a popular staple food in many homes within South Africa. The bread is prepared in a container in a pot of boiling water. It differs from the traditional dumpling in that it is prepared using yeast instead of baking powder. There are different variations of the dish around South Africa. In the Zulu culture, dombolo is cooked on top of a stew rather than on its own in a separate pot. That variation of the steamed bread is known amongst the Zulus as uJeqe. Dombolo is often consumed with different kinds of side dishes such as chicken stew, beef stew, oxtail stew, lamb stew, or tripe.

Dombolo can be made by using cake flour and placed on top of a stew to soak in the stew's flavours.

It is related to Dutch Jan-in-de-zak or broeder.

== See also ==
- List of steamed foods
- South African cuisine
