= Corunda =

Mexican type of tamale

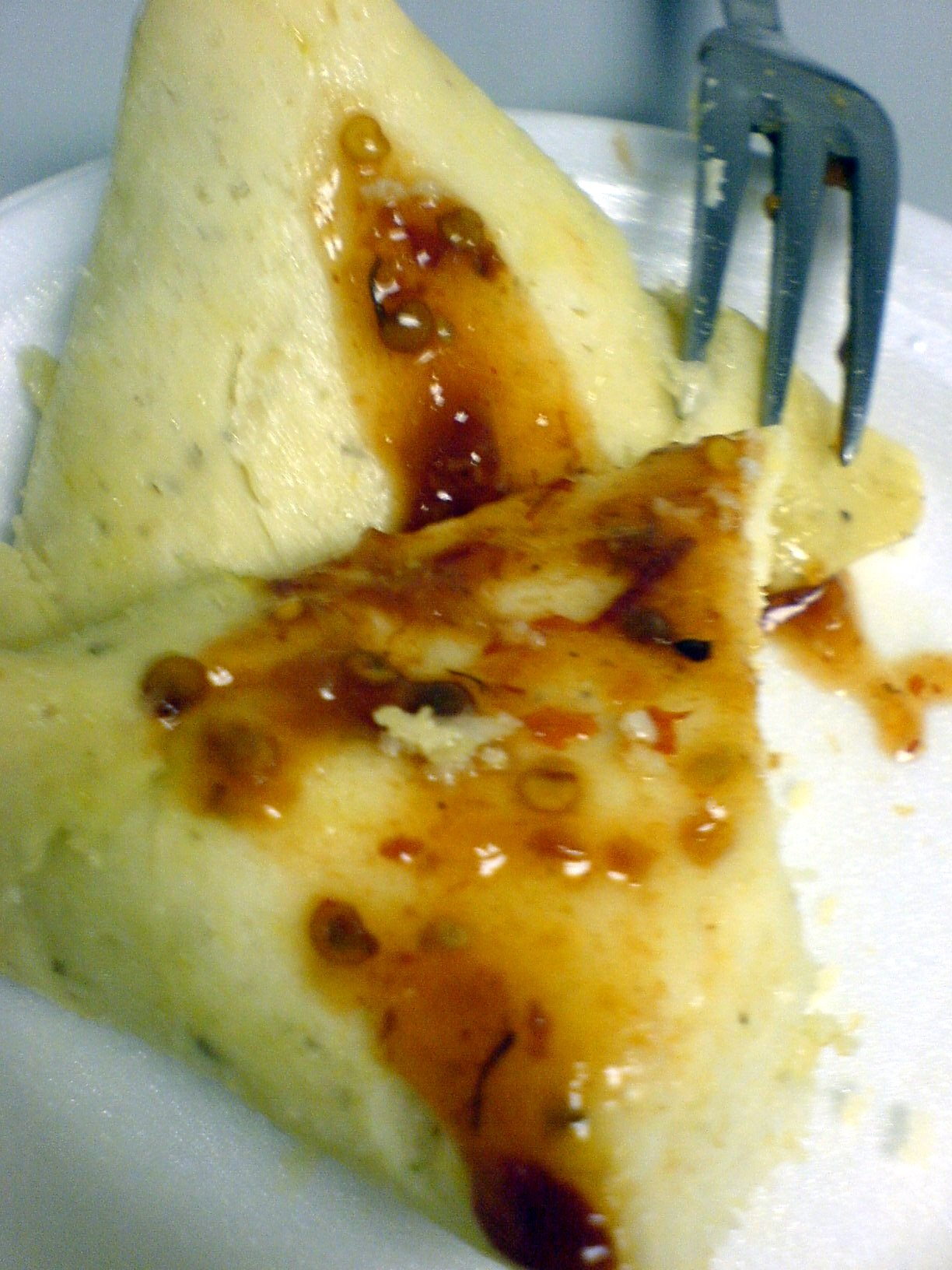
- Type: Tamal
- Place of origin: Mexico
- Region or state: Michoacán

Corunda is a Mexican type of tamale, but wrapped in a long corn or reed plant leaf, and folded, making a triangular shape or spherical shape. They are typically steamed until golden and eaten with sour cream (Mexican crema) and red salsa. Unlike typical tamales, they do not always have a filling. They are usually made using corn masa, salt, lard, and water. Some corundas are filled with salsa on the inside. They are commonly sold by the dozen.

It is a common food in the state of Michoacán. Known since pre-Hispanic times, it is also part of the gastronomy of some neighboring states such as Guanajuato, Jalisco, Guerrero, Colima, Estado de México and Querétaro. The best known are those of manteca, wrapped in leaves from the stalk of the fresh corn plant, not in corn husks, and those of ceniza, wrapped in reed leaves.

== See also ==
- List of Mexican dishes
- List of steamed foods
