= Huajuan =

Chinese steamed bun

Mandarin roll
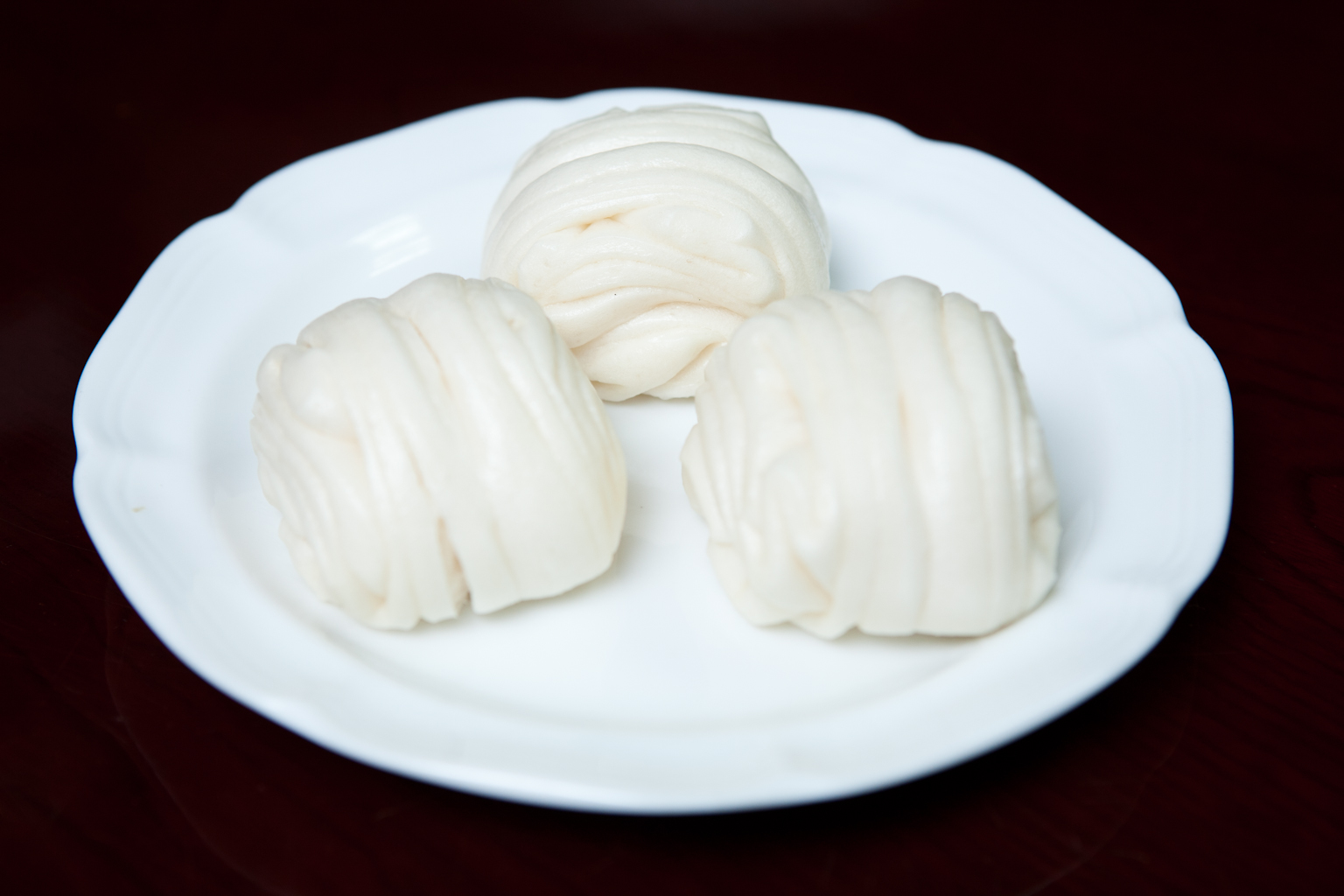
- Classic white mandarin rolls
- Alternative names: Steamed Mandarin rolls
- Type: Bread
- Place of origin: China
- Main ingredients: wheat flour, yeast, water, salt, sugar, and baking soda

Huajuan
- Chinese: 花捲/卷
- Literal meaning: flower roll
Transcriptions
Standard Mandarin
- Hanyu Pinyin: huā juǎn
Yue: Cantonese
- Jyutping: faa1 gyun2

Alternative Chinese name
- Chinese: 雲絲卷
- Literal meaning: cloud silk roll
Transcriptions
Standard Mandarin
- Hanyu Pinyin: yúnsī juǎn
Yue: Cantonese
- Jyutping: wan4 si1 gyun2

Huajuan (Chinese: 花捲/卷; pinyin: huājuǎn), also called Mandarin rolls or flower rolls, are a variety of steamed bun from northern China which are popular throughout the country. Like mantou, the mandarin roll is a dim sum dish and a staple of Chinese cuisine. Huā juǎn are named for their distinctive shape; the literal English translation of "huā juǎn" is "flower twist."

The dough of the rolls is made of wheat flour, yeast, water, salt, sugar, and baking soda; sometimes soybean oil, vegetable shortening, and milk or milk powder are used. After proofing, the stretchy and pliable dough is layered with scallions, sliced and twisted into layered knots, and steamed. The result is a lightly oily roll with a pillowy, fluffy texture and pleasant chew.

Mandarin rolls are usually savory, thanks to the use of scallions, salt, and occasional addition of Chinese five spice in the filling. However, sweet versions also exist. Because southern varieties of mandarin rolls are slightly sweet, they can be eaten plain. Sometimes they are eaten with sweetened condensed milk.

== See also ==
- Mantou
- List of buns
- List of steamed foods
