= Pudding basin =

Bowl or vessel used to steam puddings

A pudding basin is a bowl or vessel with thick walls and a pronounced rim to secure a cover during cooking, used to steam puddings. Typically made of glazed earthenware or tempered glass, this kitchen vessel may also be used as a mixing bowl.

They have been manufactured by British potteries since at least the early 19th century, with well-known makers producing classic (the most famous of which being Cornishware striped earthenware) basins.

Pudding basins are often associated with popular historic British dishes such as Christmas pudding, treacle sponge pudding or steak and kidney pudding.
