= Longevity peach =

Type of lotus seed bun

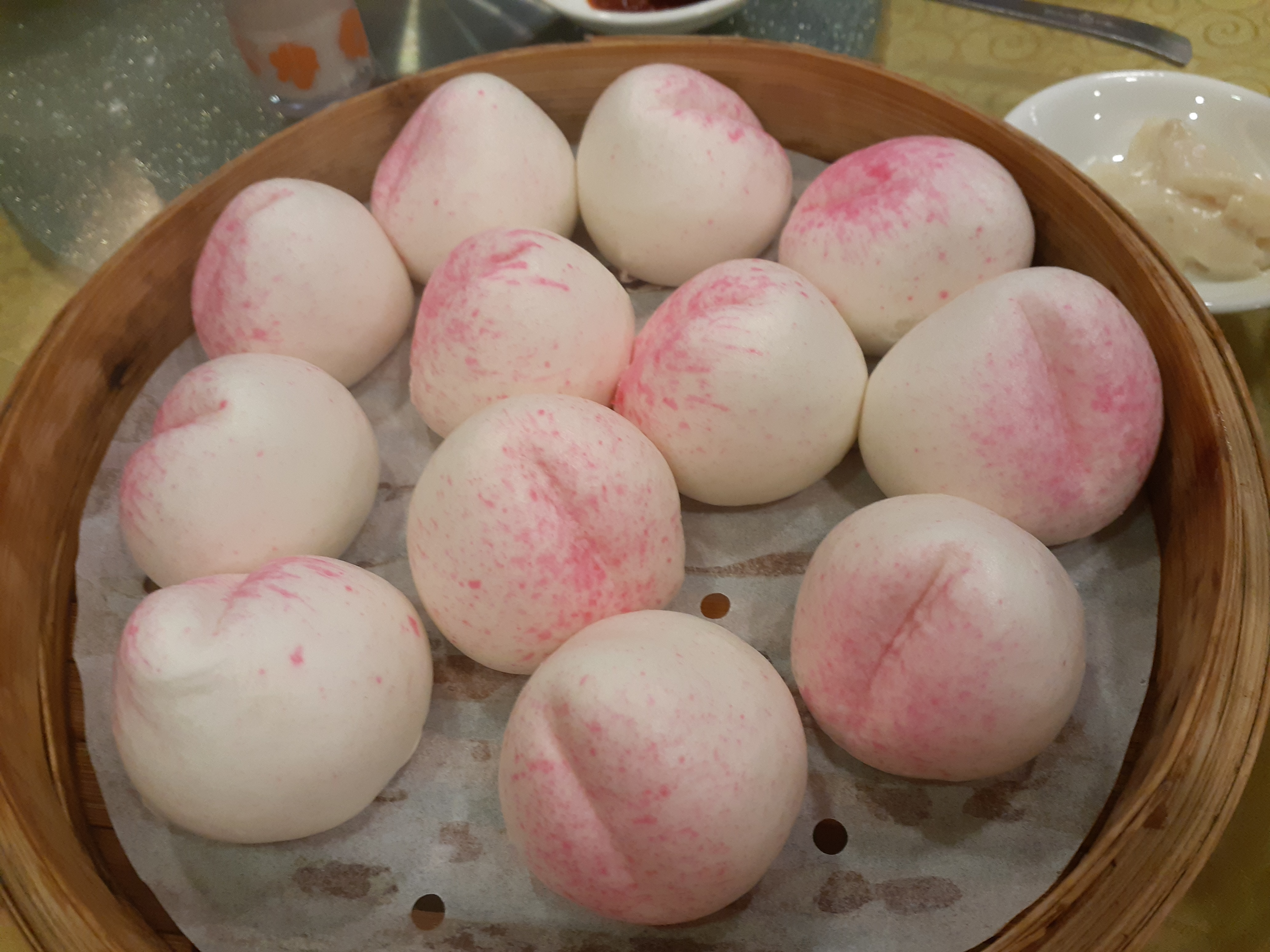
- Shoutao in a bamboo steamer

Chinese name
- Traditional Chinese: 壽桃
- Simplified Chinese: 寿桃
Transcriptions
Standard Mandarin
- Hanyu Pinyin: shòu táo
Hakka
- Pha̍k-fa-sṳ: su thò
Yue: Cantonese
- Jyutping: sau6 tou4
Southern Min
- Hokkien POJ: siū-thô
Eastern Min
- Fuzhou BUC: sêu tò̤

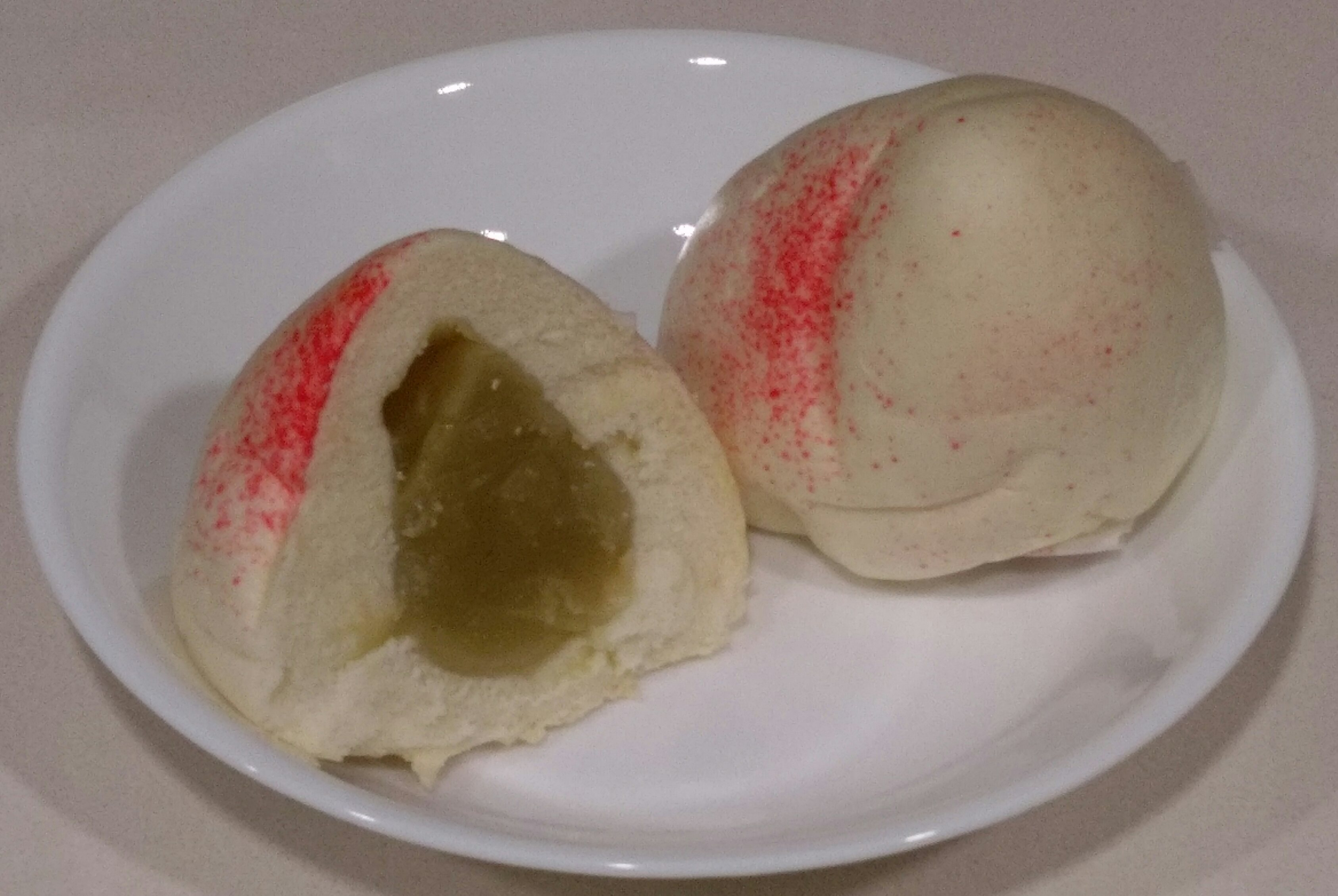
Longevity peaches, with sweet lotus paste inside

A longevity peach or shòutáo (寿桃; 壽桃; sau6 tou4), is a type of lotus seed bun, sometimes with a filling made of red bean paste or lotus paste. It is white with a red dyed tip with a crease along the side, mimicking the shape of a peach. Occasionally, bakers add green decorations that mimic leaves. The longevity peach is a representation of Peaches of Immortality. According to Chinese folk legends, these peaches ripen every thousands of years, and grant immortality to humans when consumed.

The pastry is typically served at the birthdays of elderly people to celebrate their achievement in having reached old age.

== See also ==
- List of buns
- List of steamed foods
