= Lotus seed bun =

Chinese sweet bun

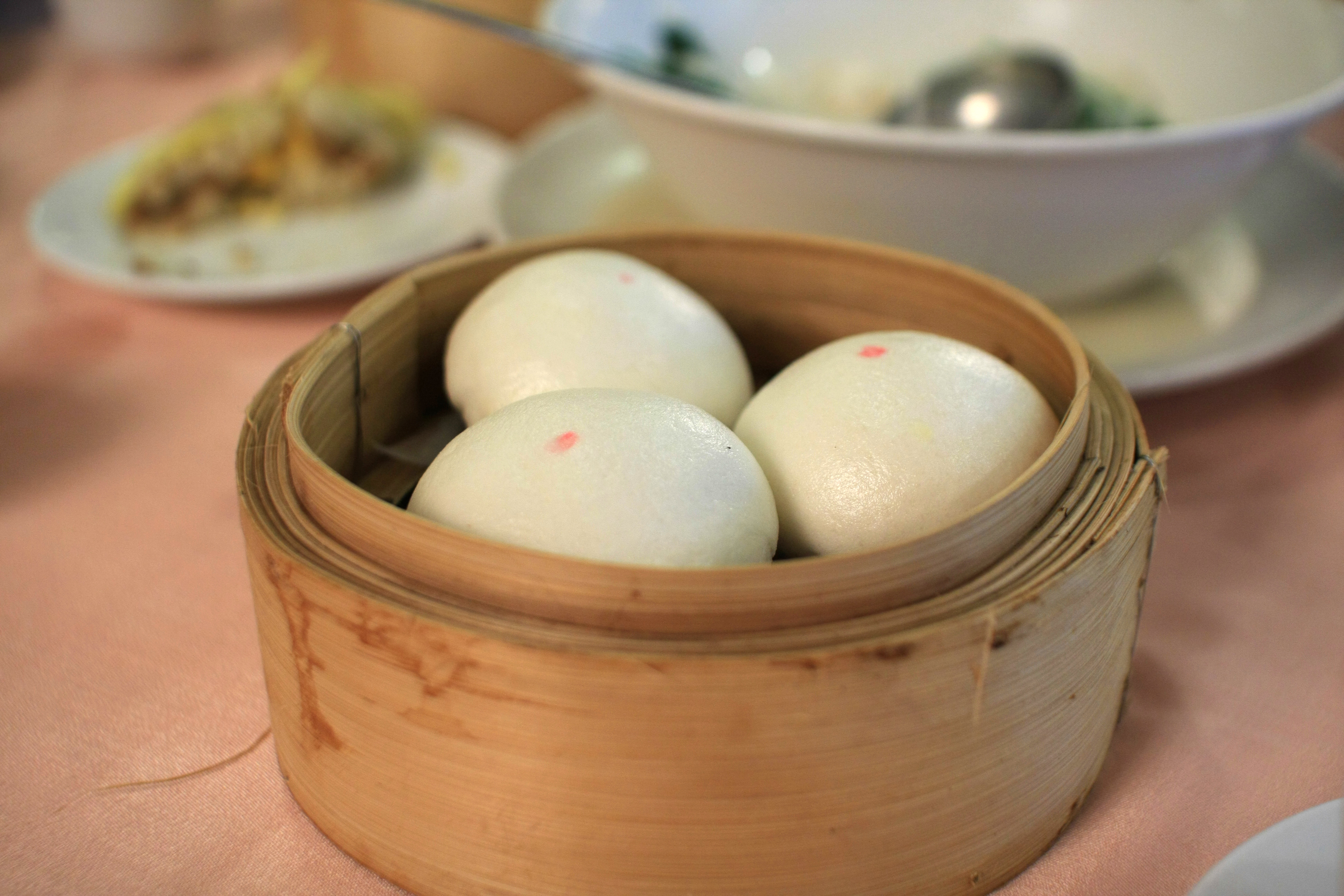
- A bamboo steamer of lotus seed buns served in a Cantonese restaurant as a type of dim sum.
- Type: Sweet bun
- Place of origin: China
- Main ingredients: Yeast-based dough, lotus seeds

Lotus seed bun
- Traditional Chinese: 蓮蓉包
- Simplified Chinese: 莲蓉包
- Hanyu Pinyin: lián róng bāo
- Cantonese Yale: lìhn yùhng bāau
Transcriptions
Standard Mandarin
- Hanyu Pinyin: lián róng bāo
- Bopomofo: ㄌㄧㄢˊ ㄖㄨㄥˊ ㄅㄠ
Hakka
- Pha̍k-fa-sṳ: lièn yùng pâu
Yue: Cantonese
- Yale Romanization: lìhn yùhng bāau
- Jyutping: lin⁴ jung⁴ baau¹
Southern Min
- Hokkien POJ: liân-jiông-pau

A lotus seed bun (Traditional Chinese: 蓮蓉包；Jyutping: lin⁴ jung⁴ baau¹; Cantonese Yale: lìhnyùhngbāau, pinyin: liánróngbāo) is a Chinese baozi filled with lotus seed paste. It is most commonly served as a form of dim sum.

== History ==
Lotus seed paste is a traditional Chinese cooking ingredient, commonly used as a sweet pastry filling, such as in Lotus seed mooncakes.

Lotus seed paste was used as a filling for sweet buns by Cantonese chefs, and rose to prominence sold as a form of dim sum.

More recently lotus seed buns have become less popular, being sold at fewer dim sum restaurants, often being replaced by other buns with different fillings, such as cocktail buns.

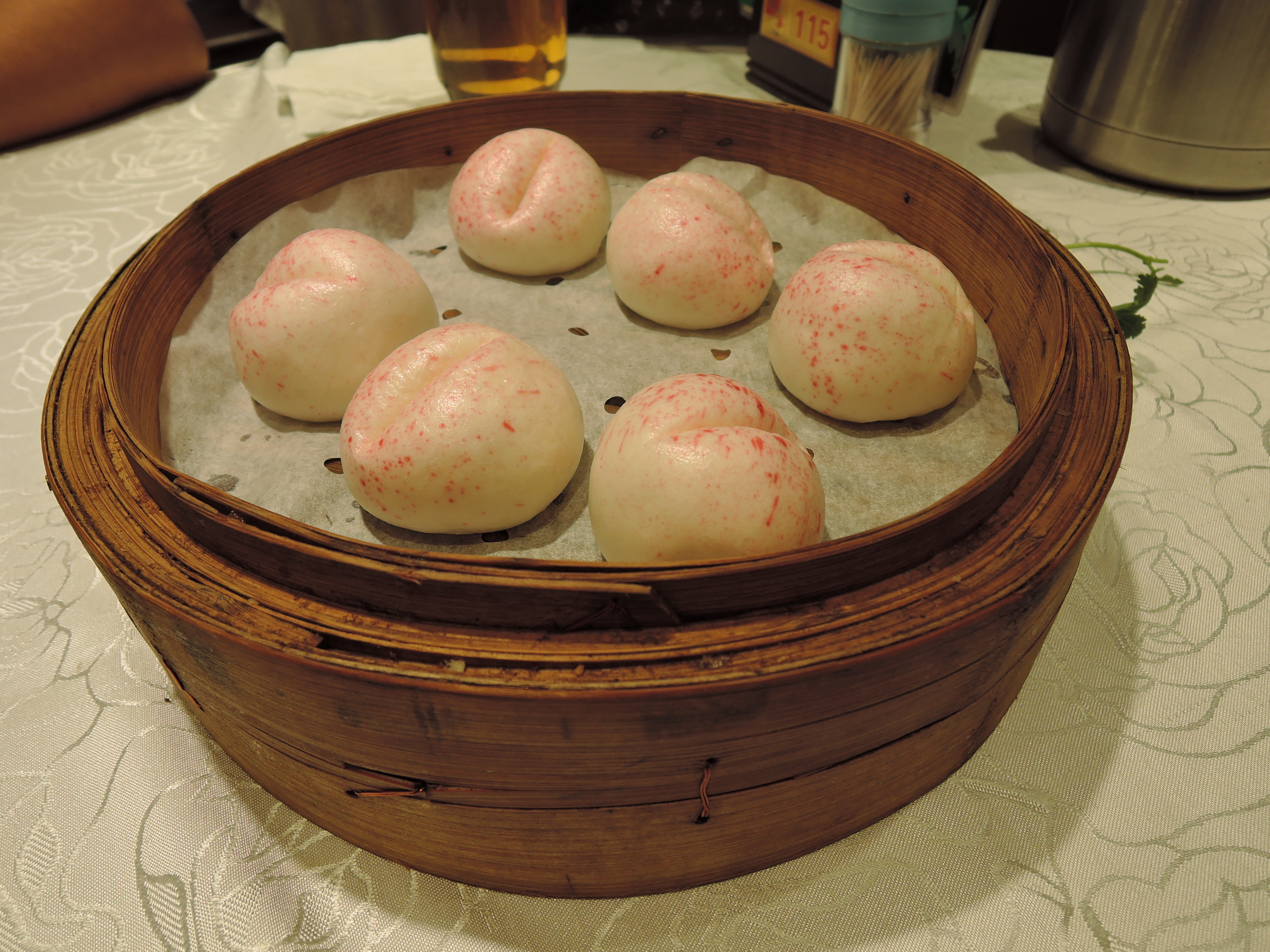
A serving of longevity peaches in a bamboo steamer

== Variations ==
Longevity peaches, or 壽桃 (pinyin: shòu táo; Jyutping: sau⁶ tou⁴) are a form of lotus seed buns served to celebrate the birthdays of elderly people, symbolizing a good omen of longevity.

== Preparation ==
Lotus seed buns are prepared by steaming a yeast-leavened dough that contains lotus seed paste. Depending on which variation of lotus seed bun is served it can take different shapes, but is traditionally made from the same dough as cha siu baau. When served as a longevity peach, the dough is twisted into a peach shape and given a pink dye to resemble a peach.

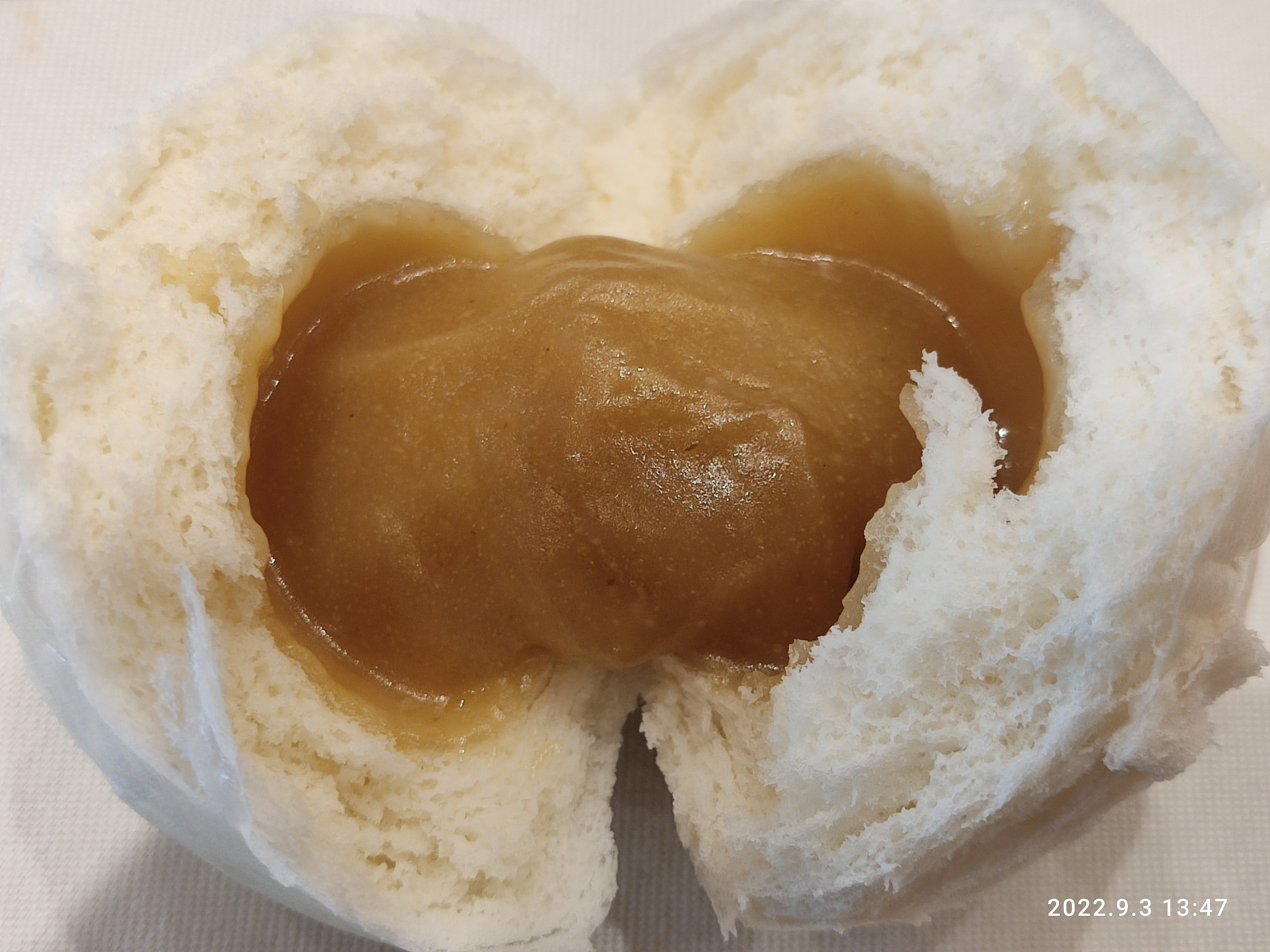
A split-open lotus seed bun, showing the lotus seed paste filling inside.

== See also ==
- Jjinppang
- Longevity peach
- List of buns
- List of steamed foods
