= Yueguangbing =

Traditional Hakka mooncake

- Type: Mooncake
- Place of origin: China
- Associated cuisine: Hakka cuisine
- Main ingredients: Glutinous rice flour and sugar

Yueguangbing

Chinese name
- Chinese: 月光饼
- Literal meaning: Moonlight biscuit
Transcriptions
Standard Mandarin
- Hanyu Pinyin: Yuèguāngbǐng
Hakka
- Romanization: ngiad6 guong1 biang3

English name
- English: Moonlight cake/ Hakka mooncake/ Hakka Mooncake Biscuits/ Hakka Moonlight biscuit

Mauritian creole name
- Mauritian creole: Gato lalune

Yueguangbing (Chinese: 月光饼; lit. 'moonlight biscuit'), also called moonlight cake, Hakka mooncake, and sometimes referred as Hakka mooncake biscuits or Hakka Moonlight cake in English, is a form of traditional mooncake of Hakka origins. It is a white, flat and disc-like biscuit which typically features carvings and paintings of flowers and animals on its top surface as adornments. It was traditionally used as offerings to the moon on the Mid-Autumn Festival. It is also consumed by the Hakka diaspora and/or people of Chinese and/or Hakka heritage in countries outside of China, such as countries in the regions of Southeast Asia and Africa (Mauritius).

== Ingredients ==
The yueguangbing is mainly composed of two ingredients: glutinous rice flour and sugar. If there is any fillings inside the cake, it is usually candied winter melon, desiccated coconut, and sesame seeds which is mixed with glutinous rice flour, sugar, margarine, and water.

== Outside China ==
=== Africa ===
The yueguangbing continues to be produced, sold, and consumed on the island of Mauritius by the Sino-Mauritians community during the Mid-Autumn Festival as a traditional custom and practice. The yueguangbing has been introduced by the Hakka diaspora and their ancestors, where it is called Niat Kwong kow (Chinese: 月光糕; lit. 'moonlight cake'; Hakka Chinese: ngiad6 guong1 gau1) but is more commonly referred by its local Mauritian creole name as gato lalune (transl. mooncake) although the term gato lalune is also applied to several forms of mooncakes, including the Niat piang (Chinese: 月饼).

== See also ==
- Mooncake
- Bánh in
- List of Chinese desserts
