= Bamboo steamer =

Vessel used for steaming in East Asian cuisine

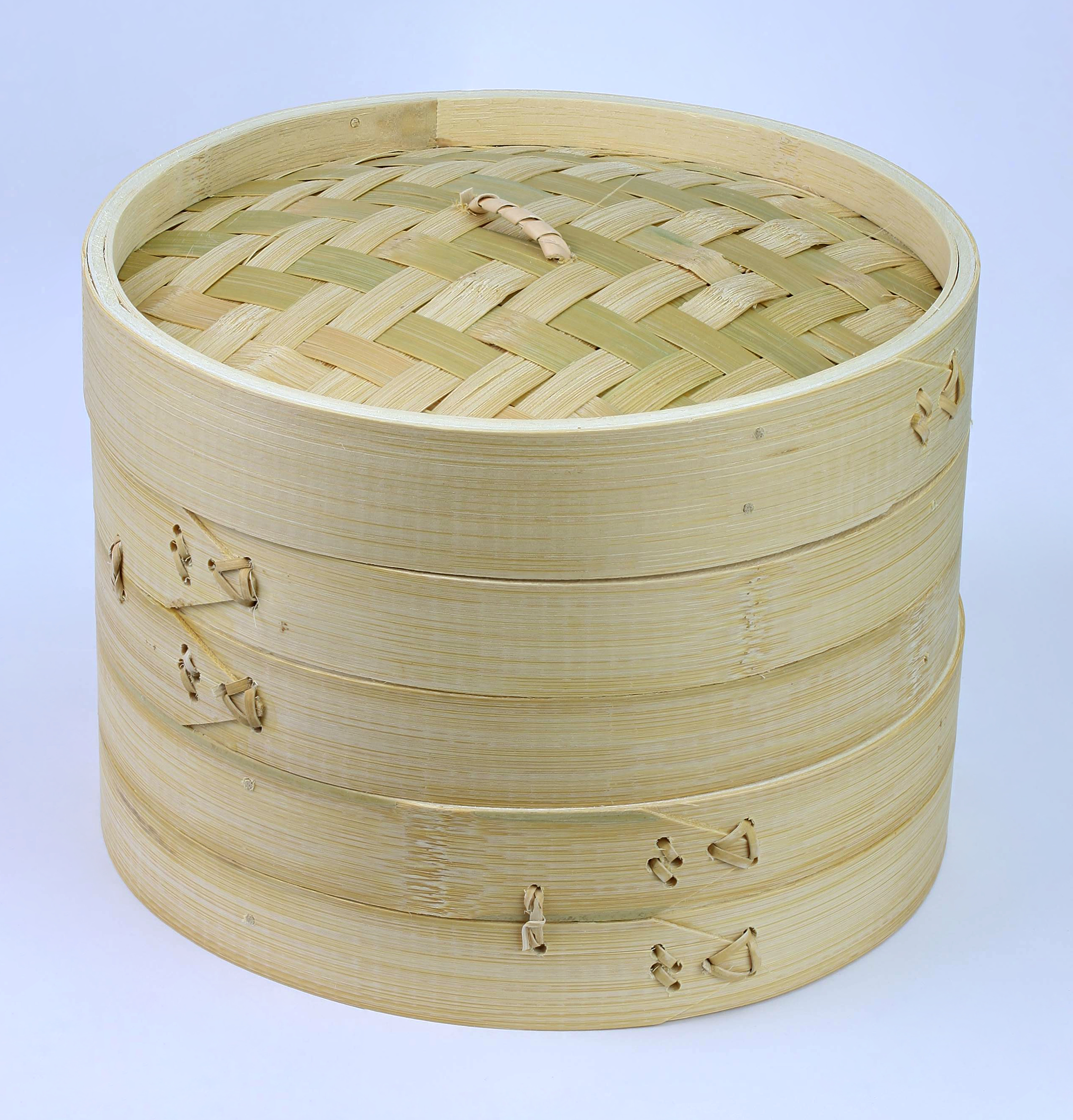
A simple two level bamboo steamer with a diameter of 20 cm

Bamboo steamers, called zhēnglóng (蒸籠) in Chinese, are a type of food steamer made of bamboo. They are used commonly in Chinese cuisine, especially dim sum, and usually come in two or more layers. Bamboo steamers have also spread to other East Asian and Southeast Asian countries.

== History ==
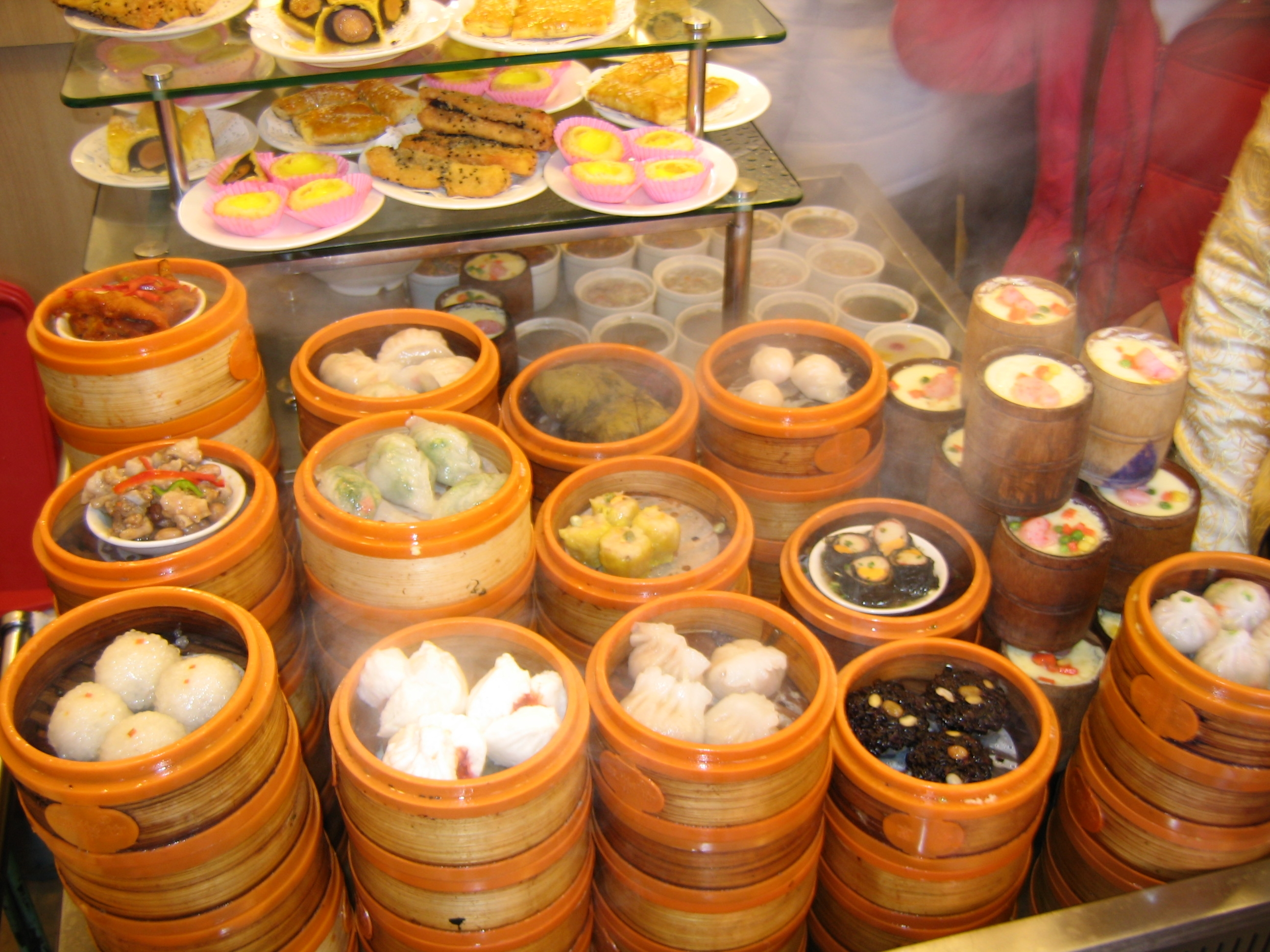
Stacked dim sum steamers

From the Neolithic period, ceramic steamers known as yan have been found at the Banpo site, dating to 5000 BC. In the lower Yangzi River, zeng pots first appeared in the Hemudu culture (5000–4500 BC) and Liangzhu culture (3200–2000 BC) and were used to steam rice.

The zhenglong in its current form originated in Southern China during the Han dynasty, possibly around Guangdong. During the reign of Emperor Gaozu, general Han Xin is said to have used bamboo and wood to make cooking utensils, and steam to cook food, in order to avoid filling the barracks with smoke. Steaming was used to cook dried foods, which were easier to store and preserve. An Eastern Han dynasty (25–220 AD) kitchen mural depicted in Dahuting Tomb No.1 in Mi County, Henan Province, is the earliest evidence of the origin of modern steamers.

Bamboo steamers are commonly used in Cantonese cuisine, such as for dim sum. They are also known in the Western world for its role in cooking and serving dim sum particularly during the practice of yum cha.

== Construction ==
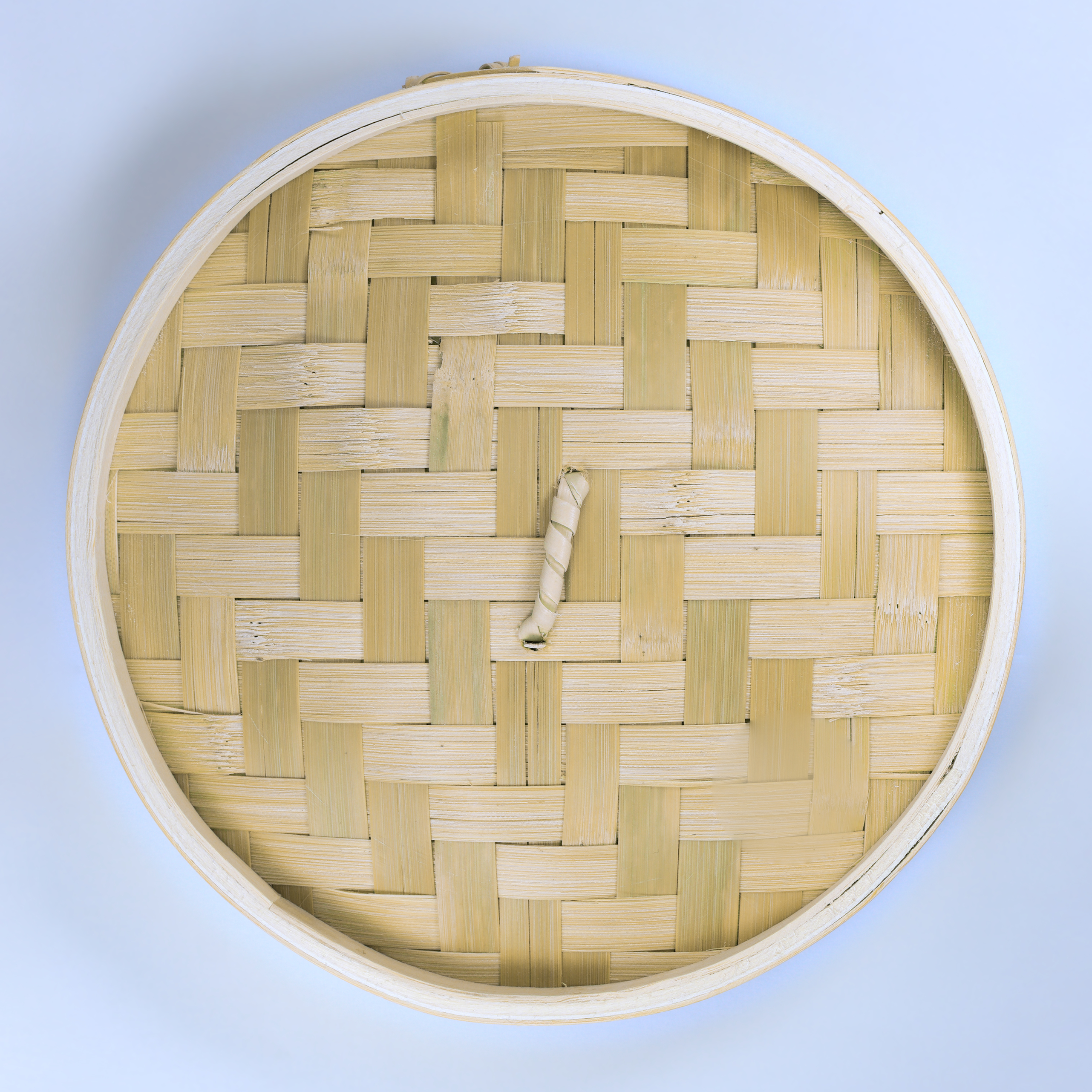
Lid

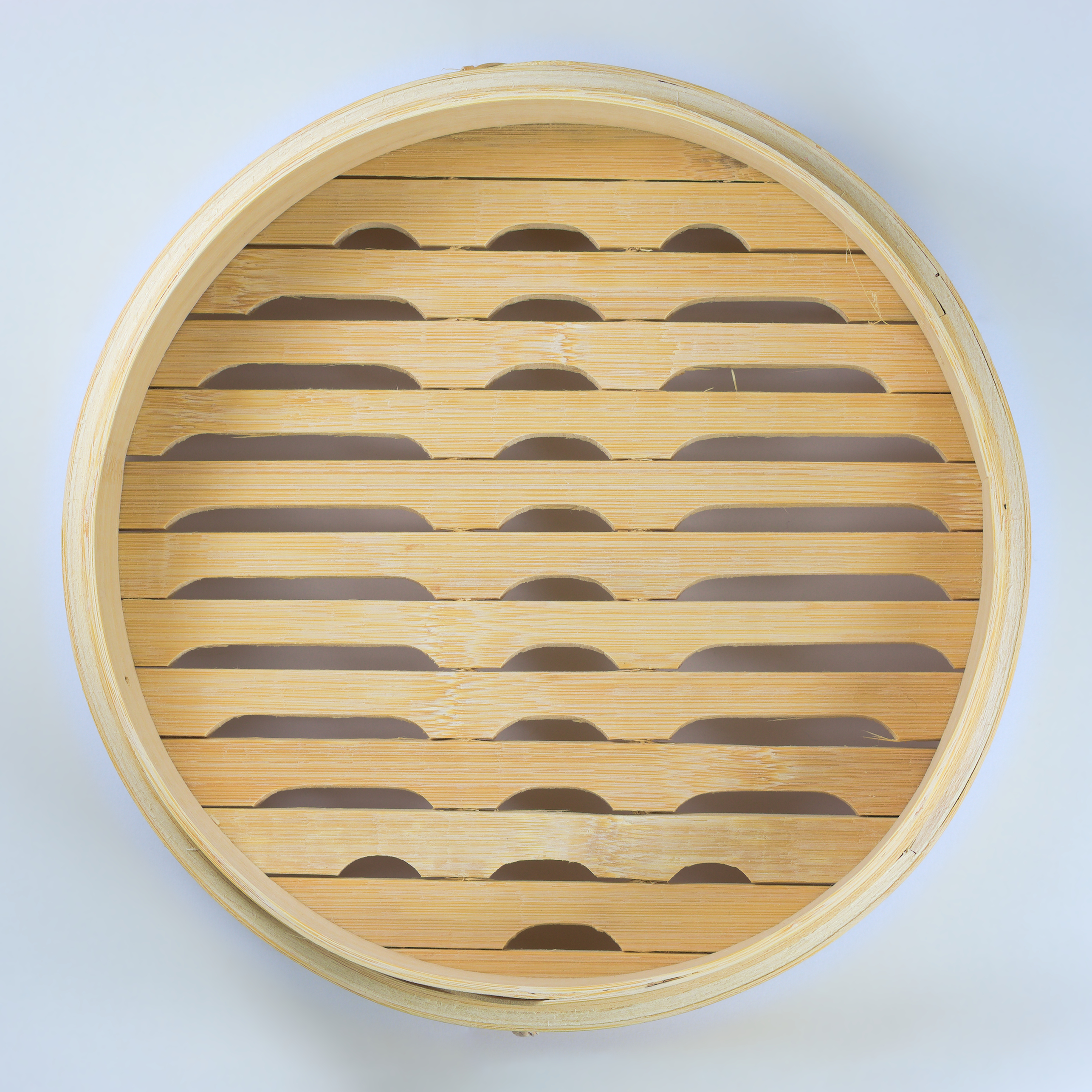
Layer with holes

Steamers are produced by removing the skin from the bamboo, soaking it in water, shaping it into a circle, and hammering it in with nails. The base is made up of woven bamboo strips, and production can take anywhere from 15 minutes to several hours depending on its size. Each layer has holes on the bottom for steam to rise up. Finally a lid is made to keep the steam in during cooking.

Most steamers are designed to be stacked on top of each other so that the steam can cook multiple servings simultaneously, as well as fit on the table (often on a Lazy Susan) while being served.

In recent years, alternatives to bamboo have been developed, including silicone.

== Gallery ==
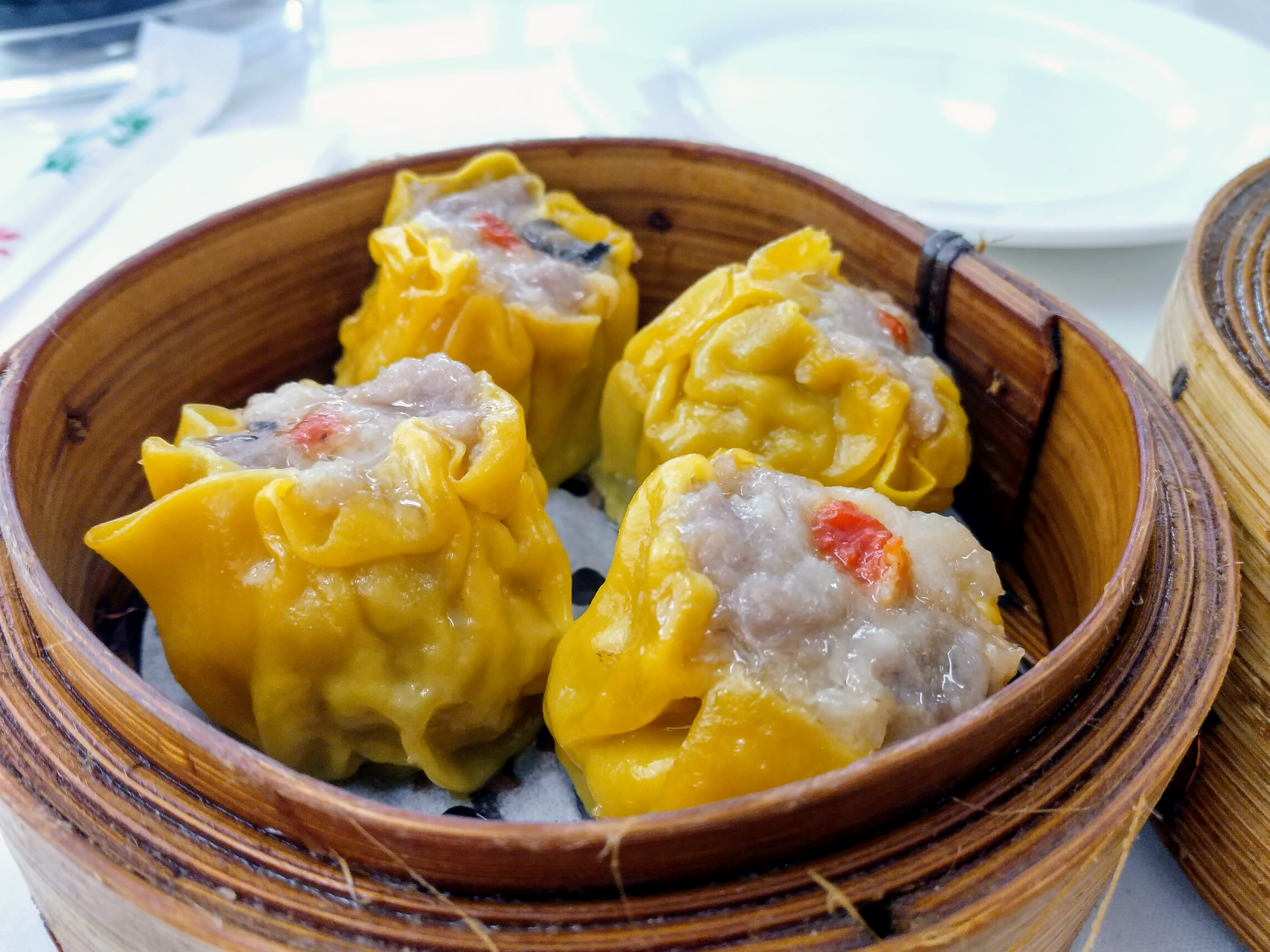
Shumai

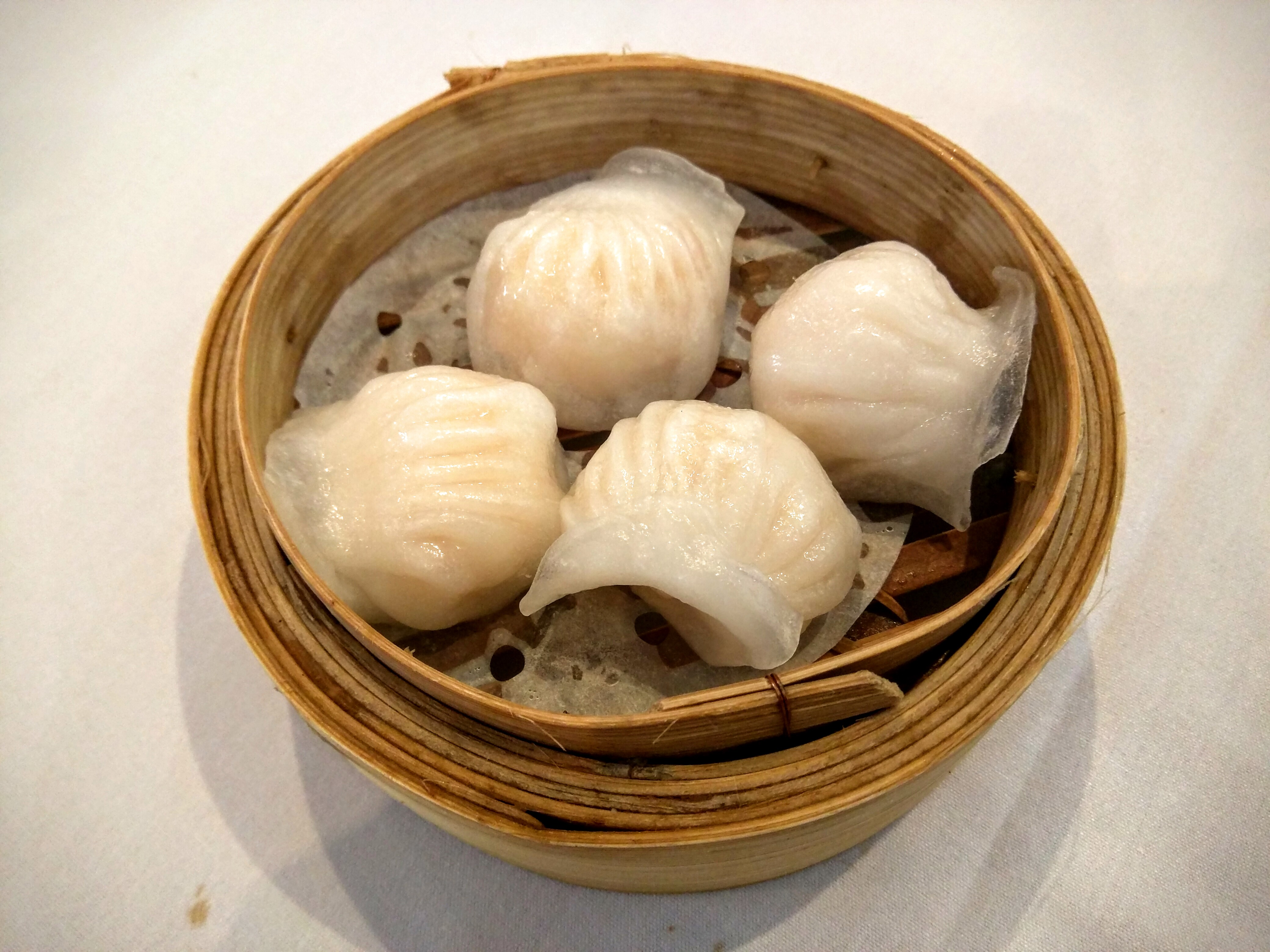
Har gow

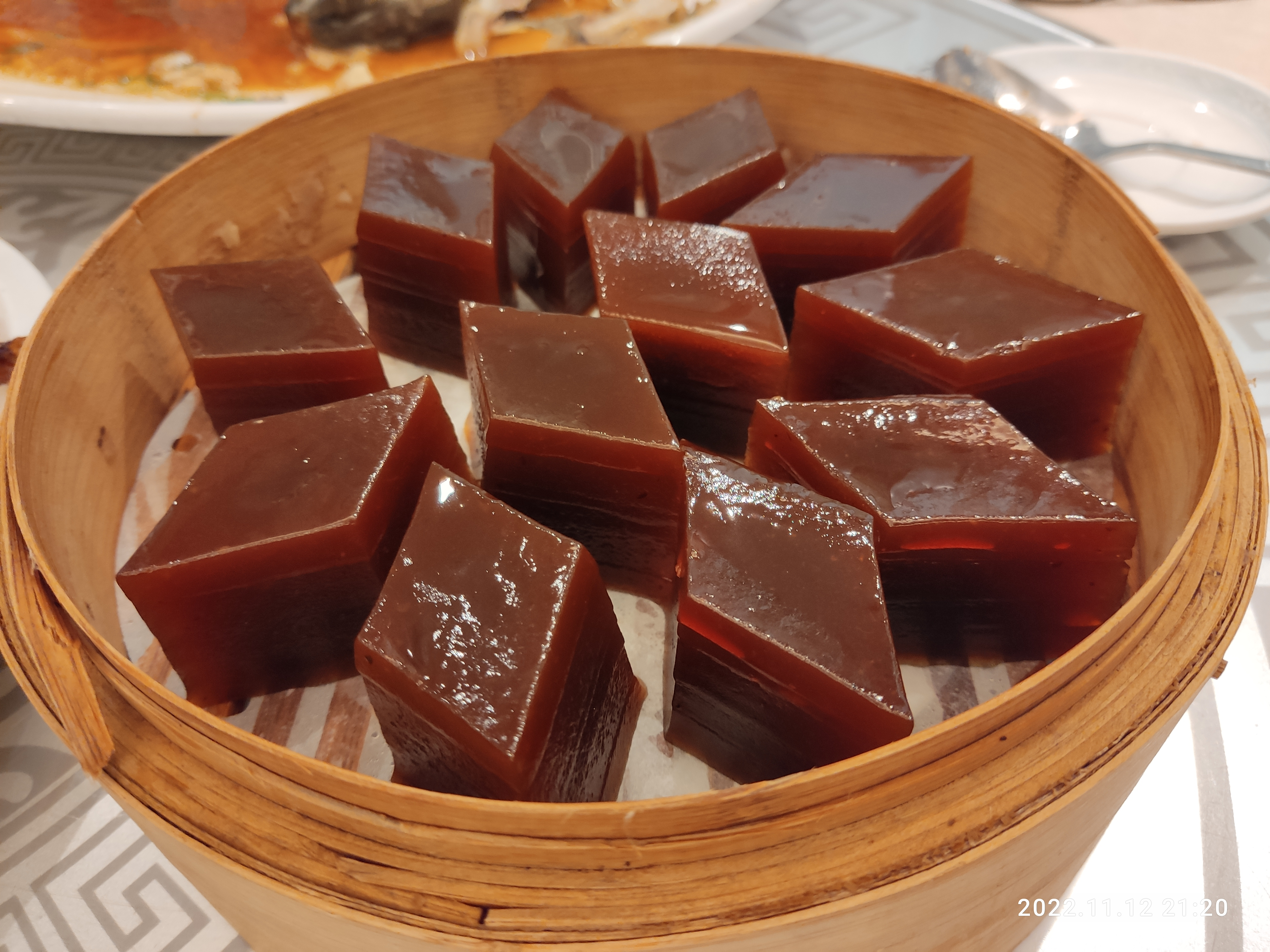
Jujube cakes

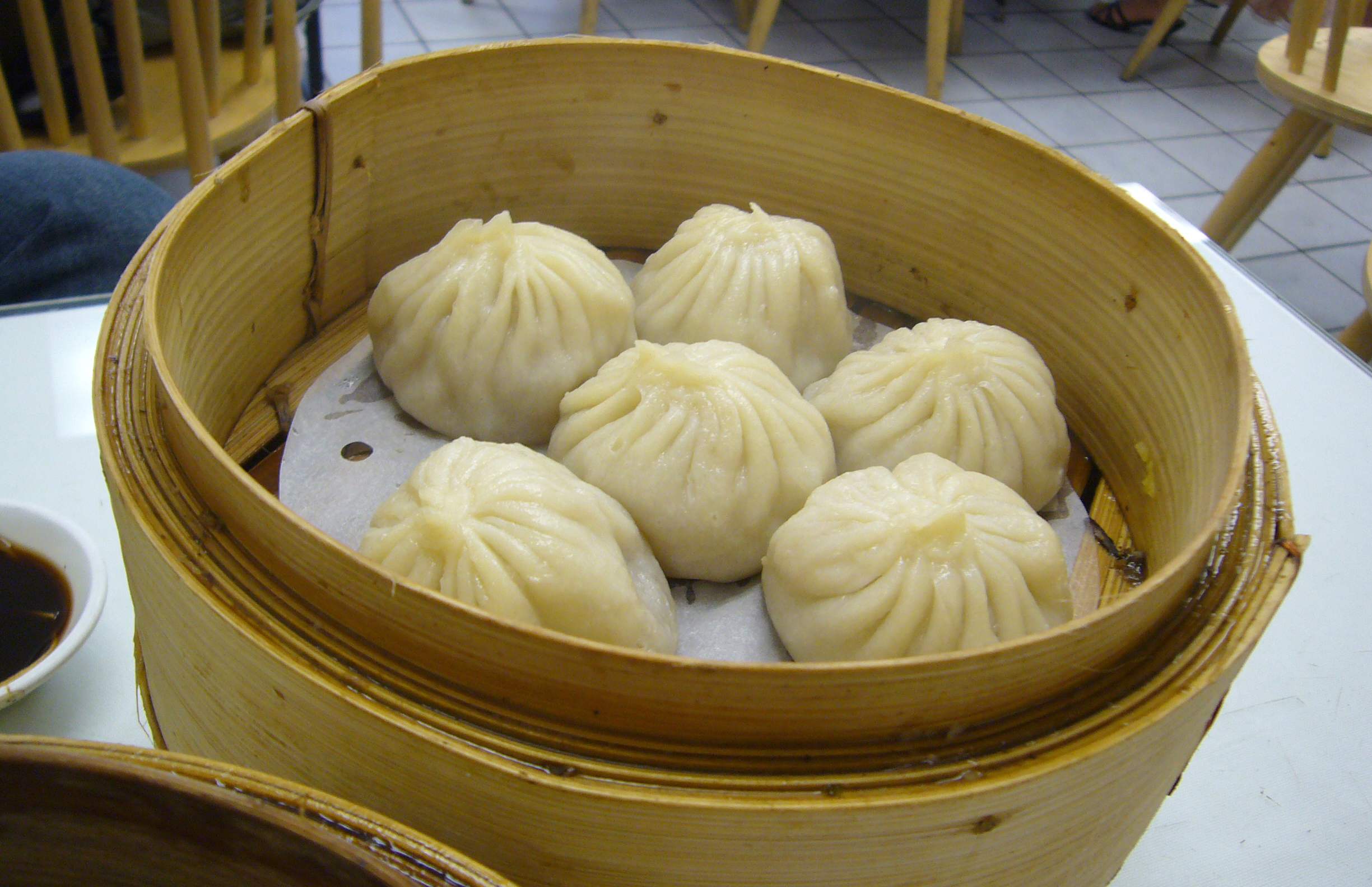
Xiaolongbao

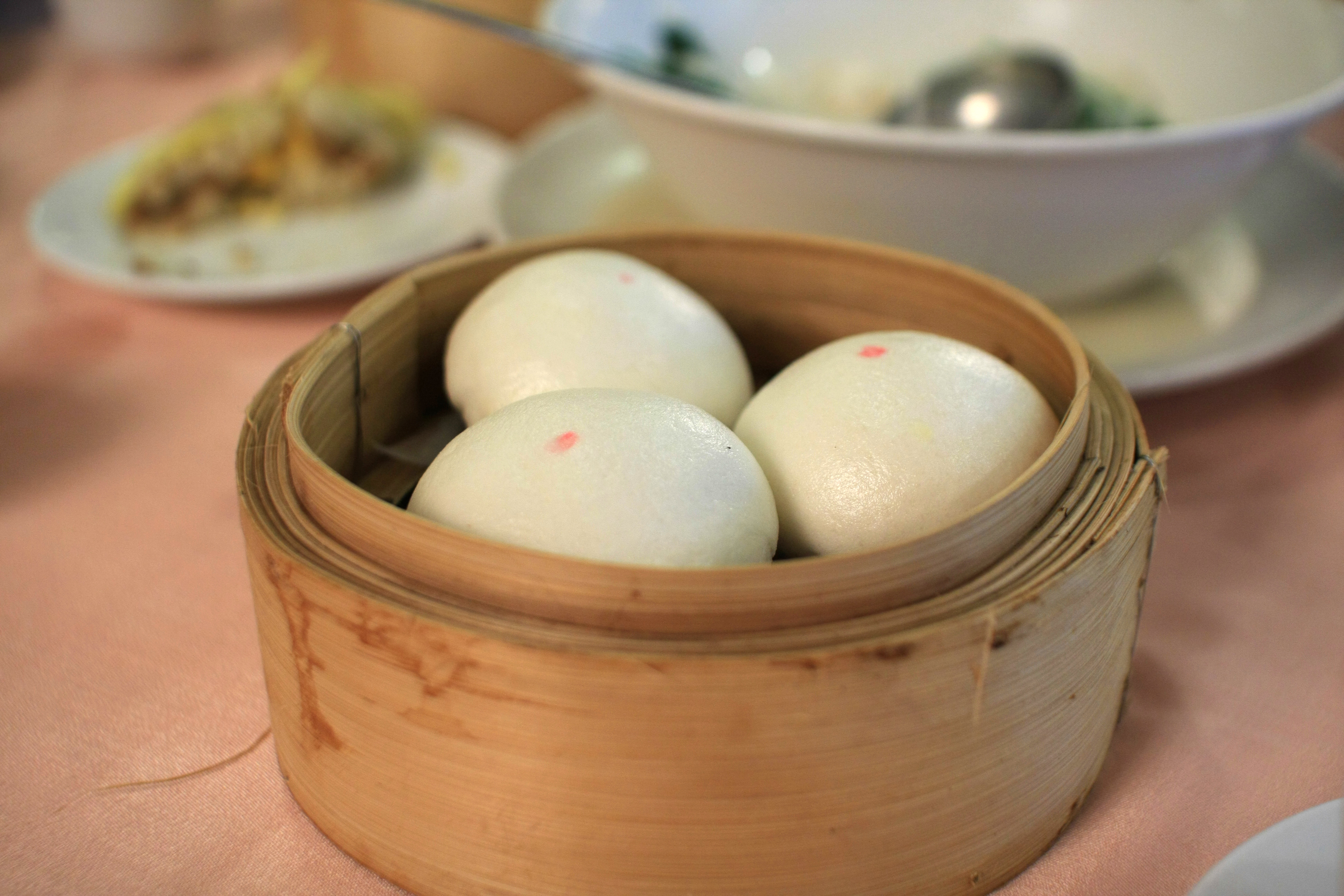
Lotus seed buns

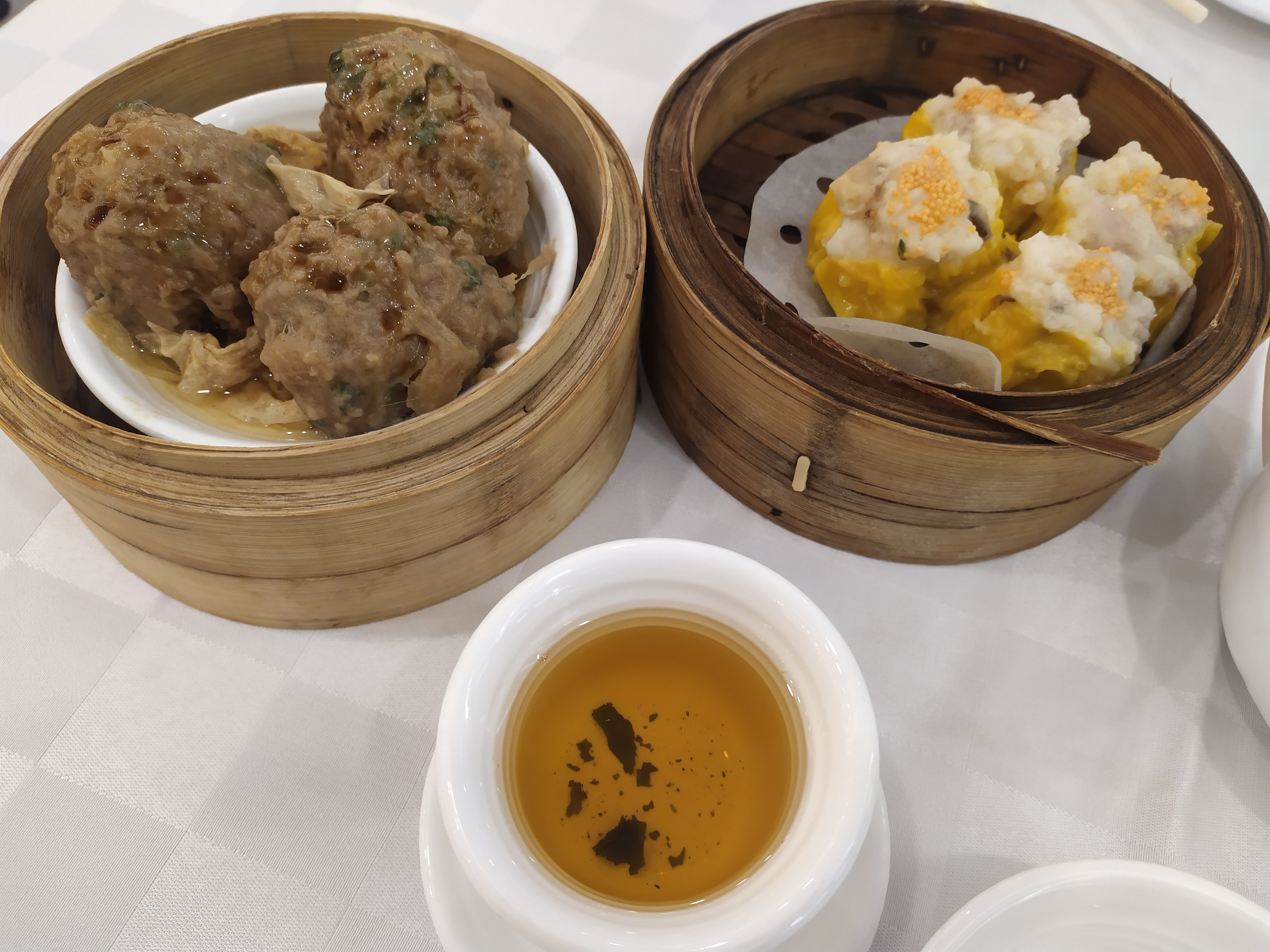
Tofu bamboo beef ball and shumai

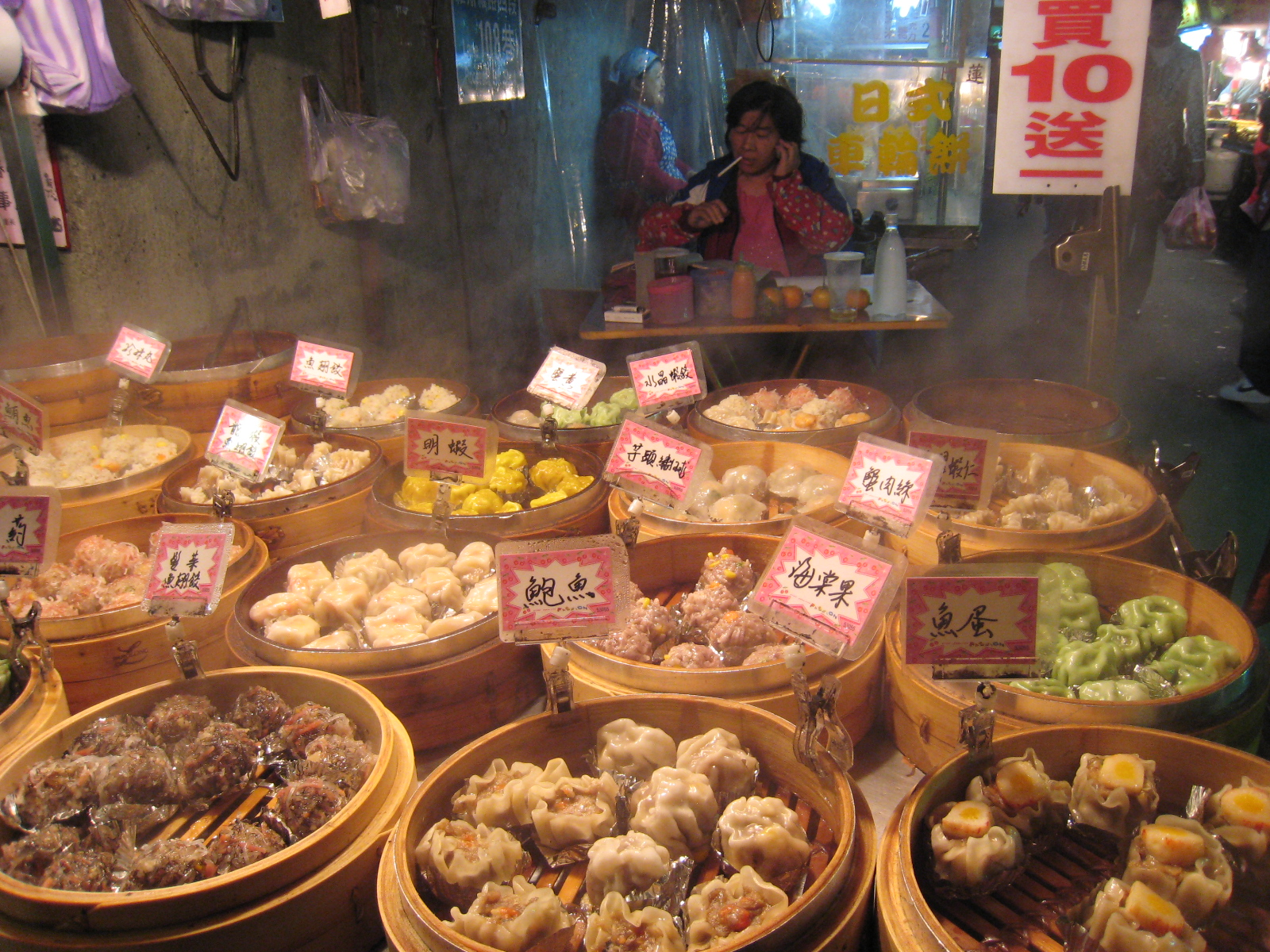
Dim sum in steamers, Taipei

== See also ==
- List of cooking vessels
- Siru
