= Mooncake =

Chinese baked item

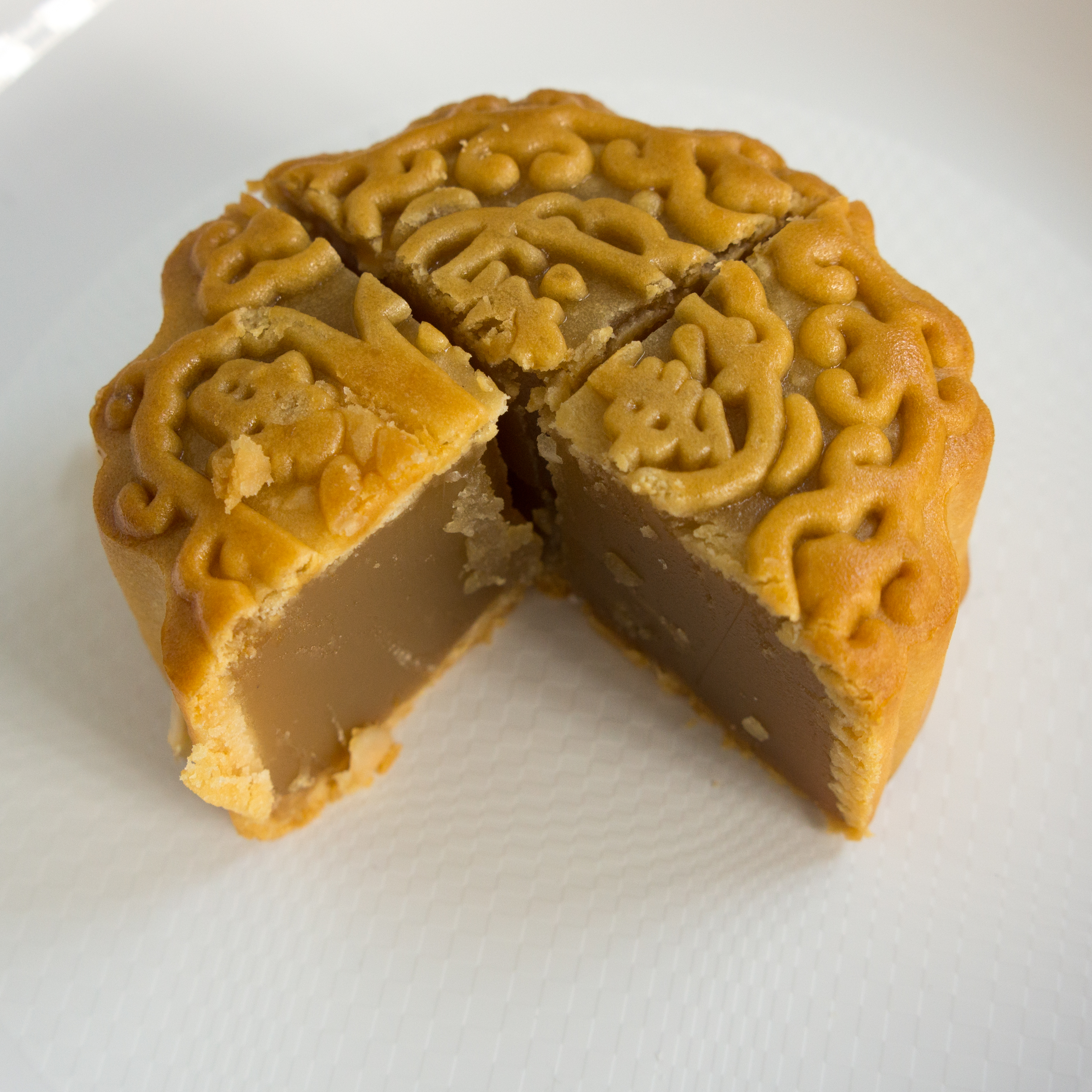
- A Cantonese mooncake filled with lotus seed paste
- Type: Pastry
- Course: Dessert
- Place of origin: China
- Region or state: East Asia and Southeast Asia
- Main ingredients: Crust: lard or vegetable oil Filling: red bean or lotus seed paste, salted egg yolk, may or may not have additional ingredients
- Food energy (per 100 g serving): 416 kcal (1,740 kJ) (approximately)

Chinese name
- Traditional Chinese: 月餅
- Simplified Chinese: 月饼
- Hanyu Pinyin: yuèbing, yuèbǐng
- Literal meaning: Moon cake/biscuit
Transcriptions
Standard Mandarin
- Hanyu Pinyin: yuèbing, yuèbǐng
- Wade–Giles: yüeh-ping
- IPA: [ɥêpìŋ]
Wu
- Romanization: gniuq^{8}-pin^{5} [ɲyɪʔ piɲ]
- Suzhounese: ngeq^{8}-pin^{3} [ŋəʔ²² pin⁵¹]
Gan
- Romanization: Ngiet7 biang3
Hakka
- Romanization: Ngat biang
Yue: Cantonese
- Yale Romanization: yuht béng
- Jyutping: jyut6 beng2
Southern Min
- Hokkien POJ: go̍eh-piáⁿ

Vietnamese name
- Vietnamese alphabet: bánh Trung thu
- Chữ Nôm: 餅中秋

Mongolian name
- Mongolian Cyrillic: еэвэн
- Mongolian script: ᠶᠧᠪᠢᠩ
Transcriptions
- SASM/GNC: SASM/GNC: yebing

Khmer name
- Khmer: នំព្រះច័ន្ទ

A mooncake (simplified Chinese: 月饼; traditional Chinese: 月餅) is a Chinese baked item traditionally eaten during the Mid-Autumn Festival (中秋節). The festival is primarily about the harvest, while a legend connects it to moon watching, and mooncakes are regarded as a delicacy. Mooncakes are offered between friends or on family gatherings while celebrating the festival. The Mid-Autumn Festival is widely regarded as one of the four most important Chinese festivals.

There are a number of varieties of mooncakes consumed within China and outside of China in overseas Chinese communities. The Cantonese mooncake is the most famous variety. A traditional Cantonese mooncake is a round pastry, measuring about 10 cm (4 in) in diameter and 3–4 cm (1 1/4–1 1/2 in) thick, with a rich, thick filling usually made from lotus seed paste (other typical fillings include red bean paste or mixed nuts) surrounded by a thin, 2–3 mm (approximately 1/8 of an inch) crust and may contain yolks from salted duck eggs.

Mooncakes are usually eaten in small wedges, accompanied by tea. Today, it is customary for business people and families to present them to their clients or relatives as presents, encouraging the market for high-end mooncakes.

Just as the Mid-Autumn Festival is celebrated in various Asian localities due to the presence of Chinese communities throughout the region, mooncakes are enjoyed in other parts of Asia too. Mooncakes have also appeared in Western countries as a form of delicacy.

== General description ==
Most mooncakes consist of a thick, tender pastry skin enveloping a sweet, dense filling, which may contain one or several whole salted egg yolks in the center to symbolize the full moon. Depending on the custom, mooncakes may also be steamed, baked, or fried.

Traditional mooncakes have an imprint on top consisting of the Chinese characters for "longevity" or "harmony", as well as the name of the bakery and the filling inside. Imprints of the Moon, the Chinese goddess of the Moon (Chang'e), flowers, vines, or a rabbit (symbol of the Moon) may surround the characters for additional decoration.

== History ==
=== Mid-Autumn Festival ===
The festival is intricately linked to legends of Chang’e, the Moon Goddess of Immortality. According to the Liji, an ancient Chinese book recording customs and ceremonies, the Chinese Emperor should offer sacrifices to the Sun in spring and the Moon in autumn. The 15th day of the 8th Chinese month is the day called "Mid-Autumn". The night on the 15th of the 8th Chinese month is also called "Night of the Moon".

Because of its central role in the Mid-Autumn festival, mooncakes remained popular even in recent years. For a number of people, they form a central part of the Mid-Autumn festival experience such that it is now commonly known as 'Mooncake Festival'.

=== Ming Revolution ===
There is a folk tale about the overthrow of the Yuan dynasty facilitated by messages smuggled in moon cakes.

Mooncakes were used by revolutionaries in their effort to overthrow the Mongol-led Yuan dynasty, eventually resulting in the establishment of the Ming dynasty. The idea is said to have been conceived by Zhu Yuanzhang and his advisor Liu Bowen, who circulated a rumor that a deadly plague was spreading and that the only way to prevent it was to eat special mooncakes, which would instantly revive and give special powers to the user. This prompted the quick distribution of mooncakes. The mooncakes contained a secret message: on the fifteenth day of the eighth lunar month, kill the rulers.

Another method of hiding a message was to print it on the surfaces of mooncakes (which came in packages of four), as a simple puzzle or mosaic. To read the message, each of the four mooncakes was cut into four parts. The resulting 16 pieces were pieced together to reveal the message. The pieces of mooncakes were then eaten to destroy the message.

== Traditional styles ==
=== Fillings ===
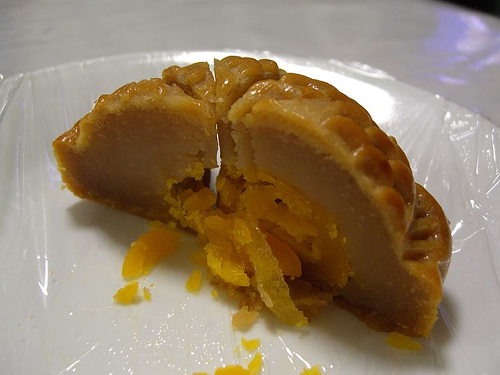
Cut mooncake showing lotus seed paste filling around the (crumbled) egg yolk "moon"

Many types of fillings can be found in traditional mooncakes:

- Lotus seed paste (蓮蓉, lían róng): Considered by some to be the original and most luxurious mooncake filling, lotus paste filling is found in multiple types of mooncakes.White lotus paste commands an even higher premium. Due to the high price of lotus paste, white kidney bean paste is sometimes used as a filler.
- Sweet bean paste (豆沙, dòu shā): A number of pastes are common fillings found in Chinese desserts. Although red bean paste, made from azuki beans, is the most common worldwide, there are regional and original preferences for bean paste made from mung beans, as well as black beans.
- Jujube paste (棗泥, zǎo ní): A sweet paste is made from the ripe fruits of the jujube (date) plant. The paste is dark red in color, a little fruity/smoky in flavor, and slightly sour in taste. Depending on the quality of the paste, jujube paste may be confused with red bean paste, which is sometimes used as a filler.
- Five kernels (五仁, wǔ rén) or mixed nuts: A filling consisting of five types of nuts and seeds, coarsely chopped, is held together with maltose syrup. Recipes differ from region to region, but commonly used nuts and seeds include walnuts, pumpkin seeds, watermelon seeds, peanuts, sesame seeds, and almonds. The mixture for the filling also contains candied winter melon, jinhua ham, or pieces of rock sugar as additional flavoring.

=== Crusts ===
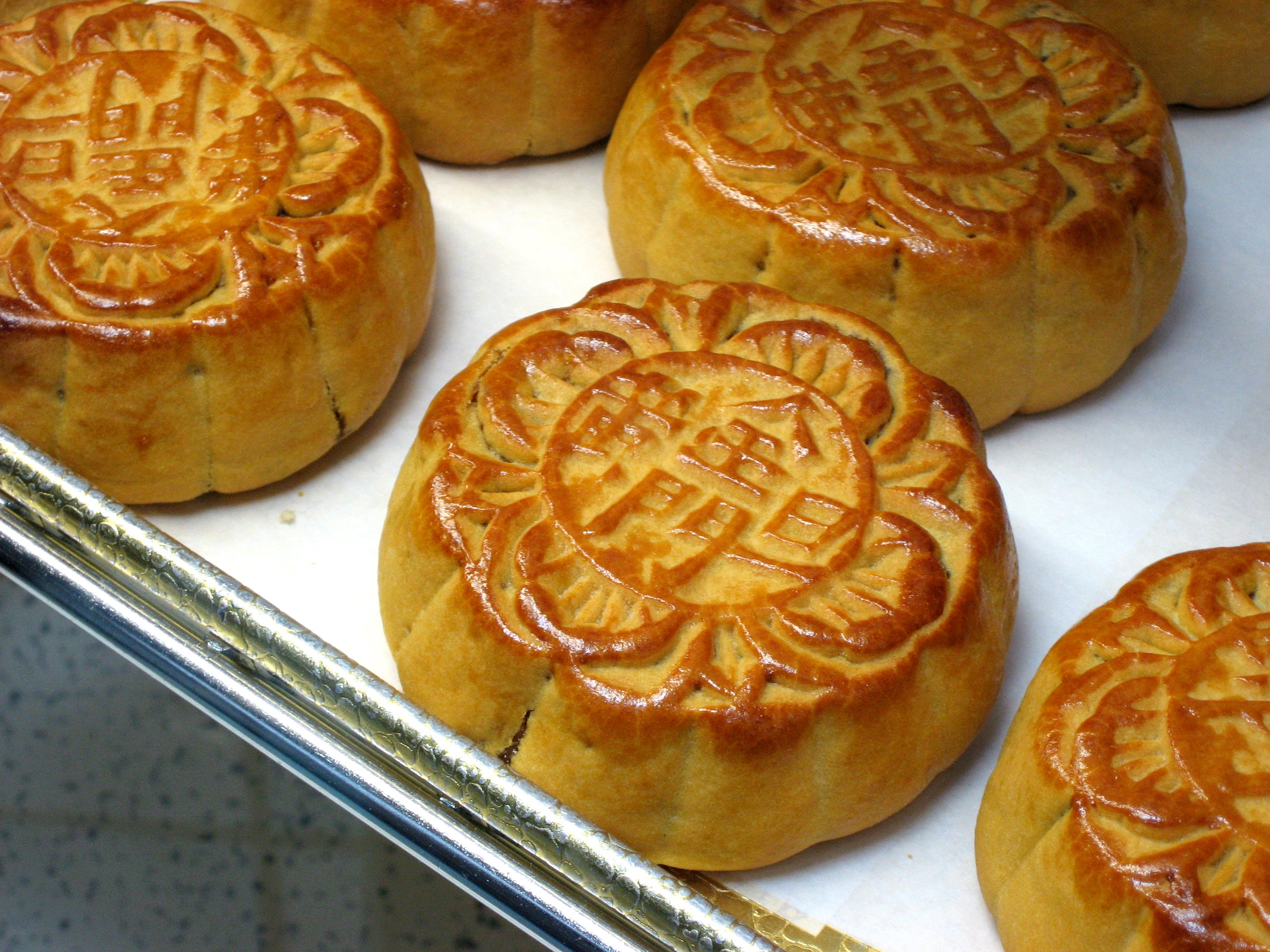
Mooncakes with Chinese characters 金門旦黃 (jinmen danhuang), meaning the moon cake contains a single egg yolk and is made from a bakery named "Golden Gate". Mooncakes usually have the bakery name pressed on them.

Traditional mooncakes vary widely depending on the region where they are produced. Most regions produce them with multiple types of fillings, but with only one type of crust. Although vegetarian mooncakes may use vegetable oil, many mooncakes use lard in their recipes. Four types of mooncake crust are traditionally used in Chinese cuisine:

- Chewy: This crust has a reddish-brown tone and glossy sheen. It is the most common type of crust used on Cantonese-style mooncakes. It is also the most commonly seen type of mooncake in North America and a number of Western countries. Chewy mooncake crusts are made using a combination of thick sugar syrup, lye water (碱水, sodium carbonate (碱 [Na_{2}CO_{3}]), flour, and oil, thus giving this crust its rich taste and a chewy yet tender texture. Chewiness can be increased further by adding maltose syrup to the mixture.
  - The dough is also baked into fish or piglet shapes (Chinese: 猪仔饼; Cantonese Yale: jyū jái béng; lit. 'piglet biscuits') and sold at bakeries as a chewy snack. They often come individually packaged in small plastic baskets, to symbolize fish being caught or piglets being bound for sale.
- Flaky: Flaky crusts are most indicative of Suzhou- and Taiwan-style mooncakes. The dough is made by rolling together alternating layers of oily dough and flour that has been stir-fried in oil. This crust has a texture similar to puff pastry.
- Tender: Mooncakes from certain provinces of China are often made to be tender rather than flaky or chewy. The texture of this type of mooncake crust is similar to the shortcrust pastry used in Western pie crusts or tart shells. Tender crusts are made mainly of a homogenous mix of sugar, oil, flour, and water. This type of crust is also commonly used in other type of Chinese pastries, such as the egg tart.
- Crumbly: Yunnan-style mooncakes are made using a hot water crust pastry that combines different kinds of flour with oil, salt, and hot water to form a dense, crumbly pastry that's quite uncommon elsewhere.

=== Regional variations in China ===
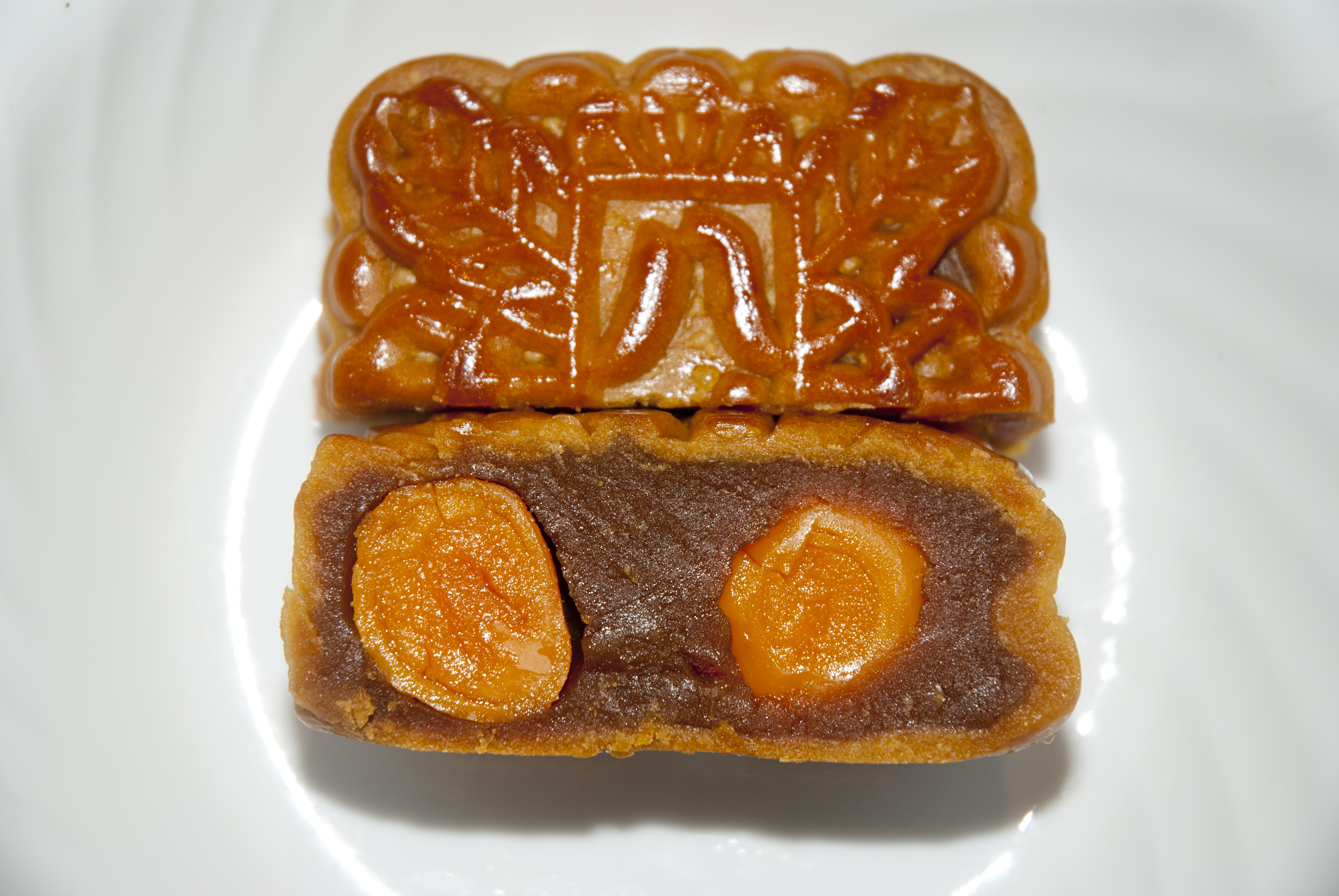
Cantonese-style mooncake with double yolk and lotus seed paste (including salted duck egg yolk and lotus seed paste as fillings, and this wheat flour pastry on the surface)

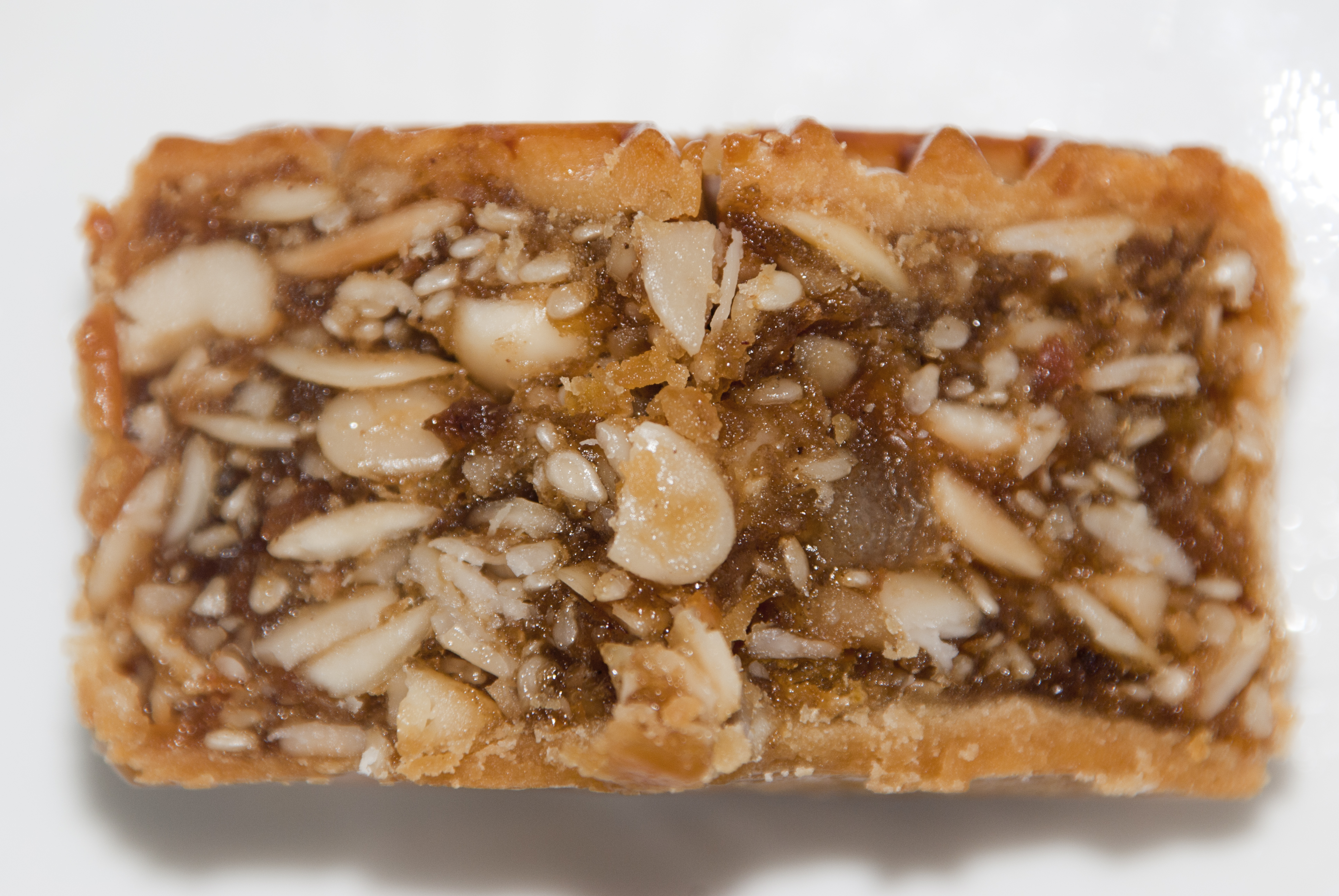
Cantonese-style mooncake with five nuts/kernels (including smashed cashews, smashed sesame seed, smashed almonds, smashed walnuts, smashed egusi seeds)

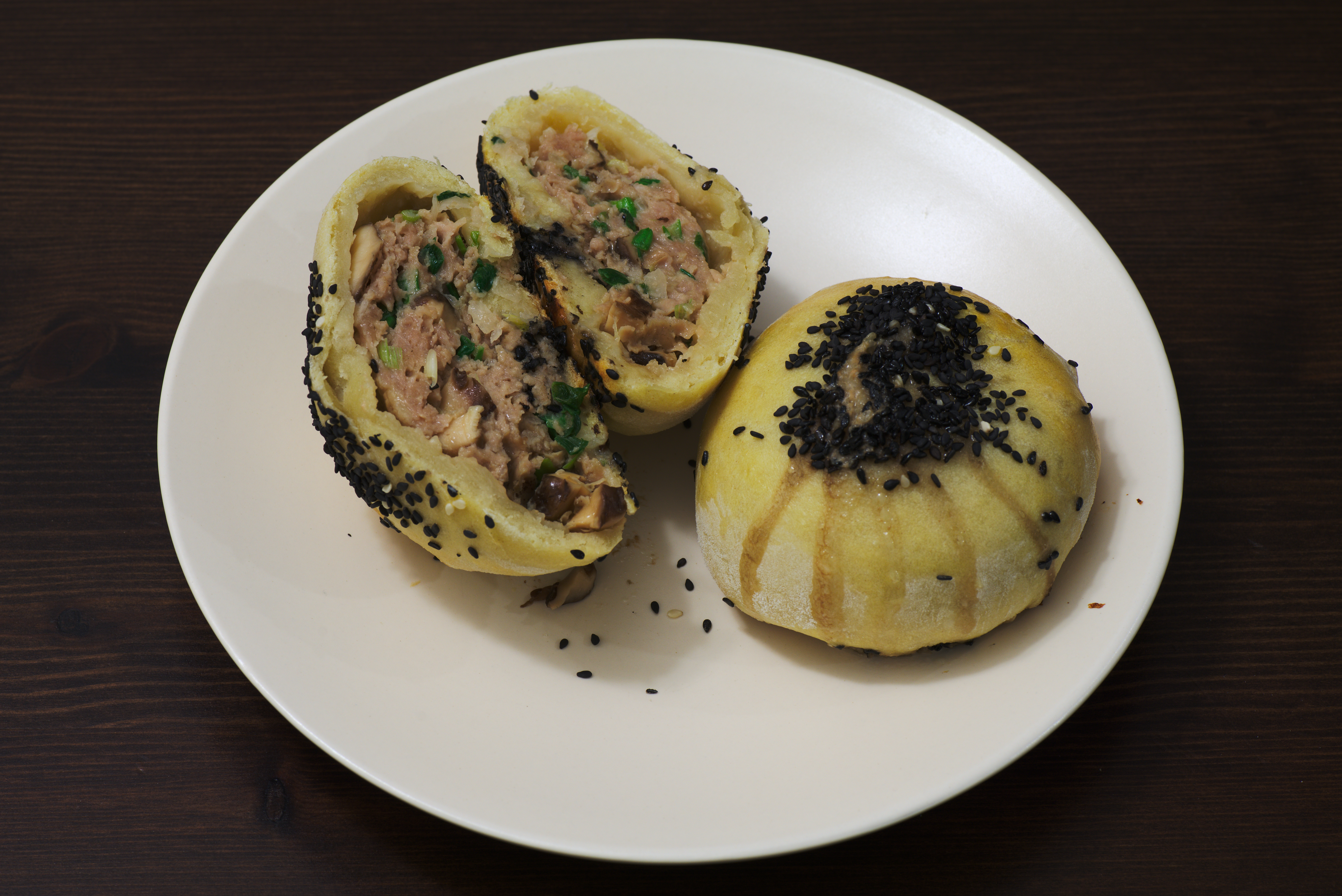
Suzhou-style mooncakes with minced pork filling

There are a number of regional variants of the mooncake. Types of traditional mooncake include:

- Beijing-style mooncake: This style has two variations. One, called di qiang, was influenced by the Suzhou-style mooncake. It has a light, foamy dough as opposed to a flaky one. The other variation, called "fan mao", has a flaky, white dough. The two most popular fillings are the mountain hawthorn and wisteria blossom flavors.
- Cantonese-style mooncake: Originating from Guangdong and Guangxi provinces, the Cantonese mooncake has multiple variations and is the most famous regional style of the mooncake. The ingredients used for the fillings are various: lotus seed paste, melon seed paste, nuts, ham, chicken, duck, roast pork, mushrooms, egg yolks, etc. More elaborate versions contain four egg yolks, representing the four phases of the moon. Recent contemporary forms (albeit non-traditional) sold in Hong Kong are even made from chocolate, ice cream or jelly.
- Shanghai-style mooncake: This style is made from shortcrust pastry which is rich, crumbly and buttery crust but not like pie dough. The most popular fillings are similar to those sweet Cantonese-style mooncake such as sweetened red bean paste, lotus seed paste and taro paste with egg yolks in the middle of the filling.
- Hong Kong-style mooncake: Hong Kong has gained its own style of mooncakes. While Hongkongers typically eat Cantonese-style mooncakes, local inventions such as snow skin mooncake have been appearing over the last few decades.
- Teochew-style mooncake: This is another flaky crust variety, but is larger in size than the Suzhou variety. It is close in diameter to the Cantonese style, but thinner. A variety of fillings are used, but the aroma of lard after roasting is stressed. The Teochew also have a fried lotus cake (or lotus pastry) (simplified Chinese: 莲花酥月饼; traditional Chinese: 蓮花酥月餅; pinyin: Liánhuā sū yuèbǐng), eaten on the Mid-Autumn Festival. This moon cake is deep-fried, not baked. The yam filling and flaky pastry crust are what set Teochew mooncakes apart from other mooncakes. These old-school confections are known as "la bia" (朥饼) in the Chaoshan region in the east of Guangdong, where the Teochews came from. La means lard or pork oil in Teochew, which is mixed with flour to make the pastry.
- Ningbo-style mooncake: This style is also inspired by the Suzhou-style. It is prevalent in Zhejiang province, and has a compact covering. The fillings are either seaweed or ham; it is also known for its spicy and salty flavor.
- Suzhou-style mooncake: This style began more than a thousand years ago, and is known for its layers of flaky dough and generous allotment of sugar and lard. Within this regional type, there are more than a dozen variations. It is also smaller than most other regional varieties. Suzhou-style mooncakes feature both sweet and savory types, the latter served hot and usually filled with pork mince. Fillings made from salt and pepper (椒鹽, jiāoyán) are common in flaky Suzhou-style mooncakes.
- Meizhou-style mooncake
- Southern Min-style mooncake
- Wenzhou-style mooncake
- Yunnan-style mooncake: The distinctive feature is the combination of various flours for the dough, including rice flour, wheat flour, and buckwheat flour, and a filling that combines Xuanwei ham and sugar.

== Contemporary styles ==
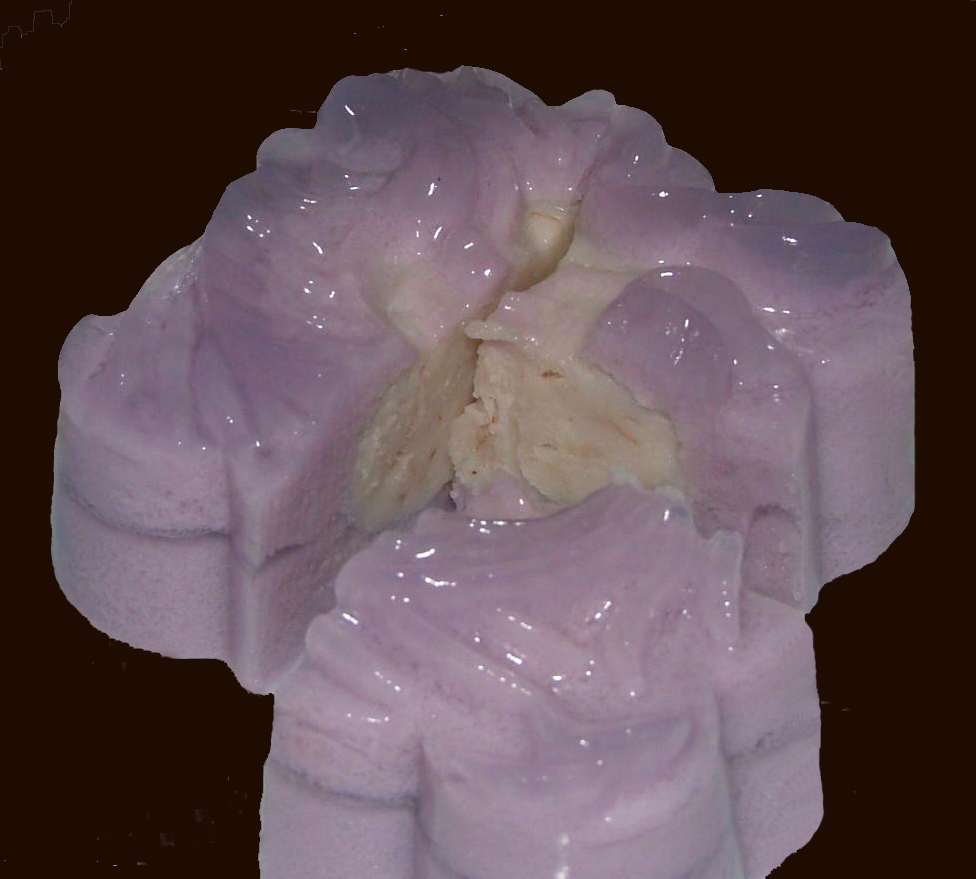
Jelly mooncake with yam-paste filling

Over time, both the crusts and the composition of the fillings of mooncakes have diversified, in particular, due to a commercial need to drive up sales in the face of intense competition between producers and from other food types. As competition among producers intensifies, retailers tend to over-design mooncake packaging to create market buzz and attract consumers, which often leads to excessive packaging and low recycling rates. Mooncake packaging continues to rely on plastic and other environmentally unfriendly materials, and China’s annual production of packaging waste is increasing at an estimated rate of about 10%, while only around 10% of recyclable resources are recovered. Part of these trends are also to cater to changing taste preferences, and because people are more health-conscious. Therefore, most of these contemporary styles are especially prominent amongst the cosmopolitan and younger Chinese and amongst the overseas Chinese community. However, traditional mooncakes are often sold alongside contemporary ones to cater to individual preferences.

Some of the earliest forms of diversification were by changing the fillings with ingredients considered unusual then. Taro paste (芋泥, yù ní), pineapple and durian were amongst the first to be introduced, especially amongst the overseas Chinese communities in Southeast Asia.The crust itself also evolved, particularly with the introduction of "snow skin mooncake". It is different from the traditional mooncake - the snow skin mooncake needs to be stored inside a refrigerator and is white on the outside. This kind of white coloured mooncake is popular with teenagers. Miniature mooncakes also appeared, in part to allow for easier individual consumption without the need to cut the large cakes.

To adapt to today's health-conscious lifestyle, fat-free mooncakes also appeared. Some are made of yogurt, jelly, and fat-free ice cream. Customers pick and choose the size and filling of mooncakes that suits their taste and diet. For added hygiene, each cake is often wrapped in airtight plastic, accompanied by a tiny food preserver packet.

Contemporary-style mooncakes, while increasingly popular, have their detractors. Pricey ingredients have pushed up prices, causing worry of a "mooncake bubble" forming in China. Food critics sometimes point out that "chocolate mooncakes" are in reality just chocolate shaped into mooncakes, and not mooncakes made with chocolate, while others complain that food chains appear intent on coming up with exotic flavors to take advantage of the market, without much thought for how well the tastes fuse together.

=== Fillings ===
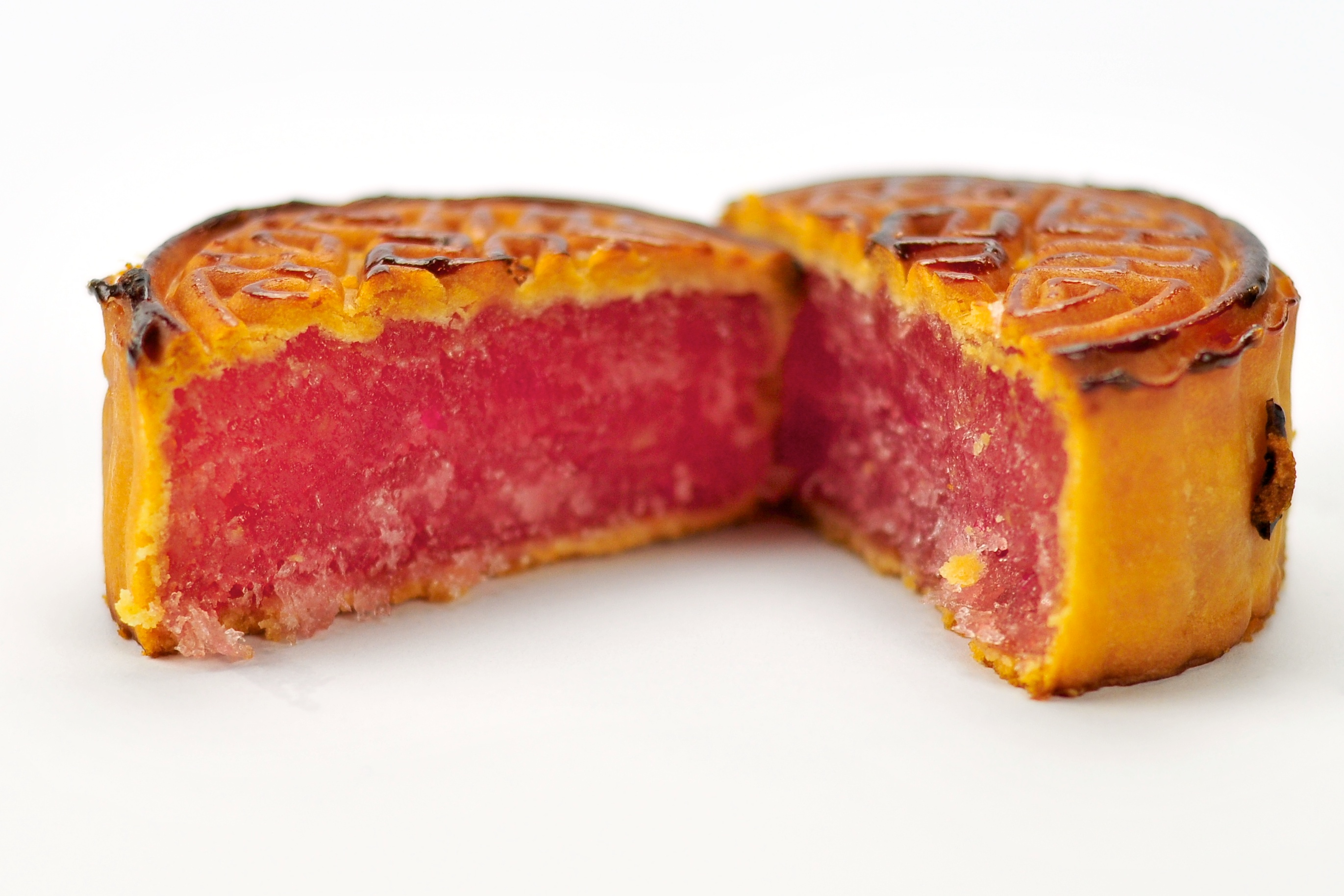
Mooncake filling

Modern mooncake with strawberry yogurt filling and mochi-based skin.

Fillings in contemporary style mooncakes have diversified to include just about anything which can be made into a paste. Mooncakes containing taro paste and pineapple, which were considered novelty items at their time of invention, have become commonplace in recent years. In addition, filling composed of ingredients such as coffee, chocolate, nuts (e.g., walnuts, mixed nuts, etc.), fruits (e.g., prunes, pineapples, melons, lychees, etc.), vegetables (e.g., sweet potatoes, etc.), and even ham have been added to give a modern twist to the traditional recipes.

Some other examples include

- cream cheese
- chicken floss
- tiramisu
- green tea
- pandan
- purple yam
- durian
- ice cream (variety of flavors)
- chocolate
- strawberry
- coffee
- peanut
- mango pomelo sago
- yogurt
- mala
- lava custard

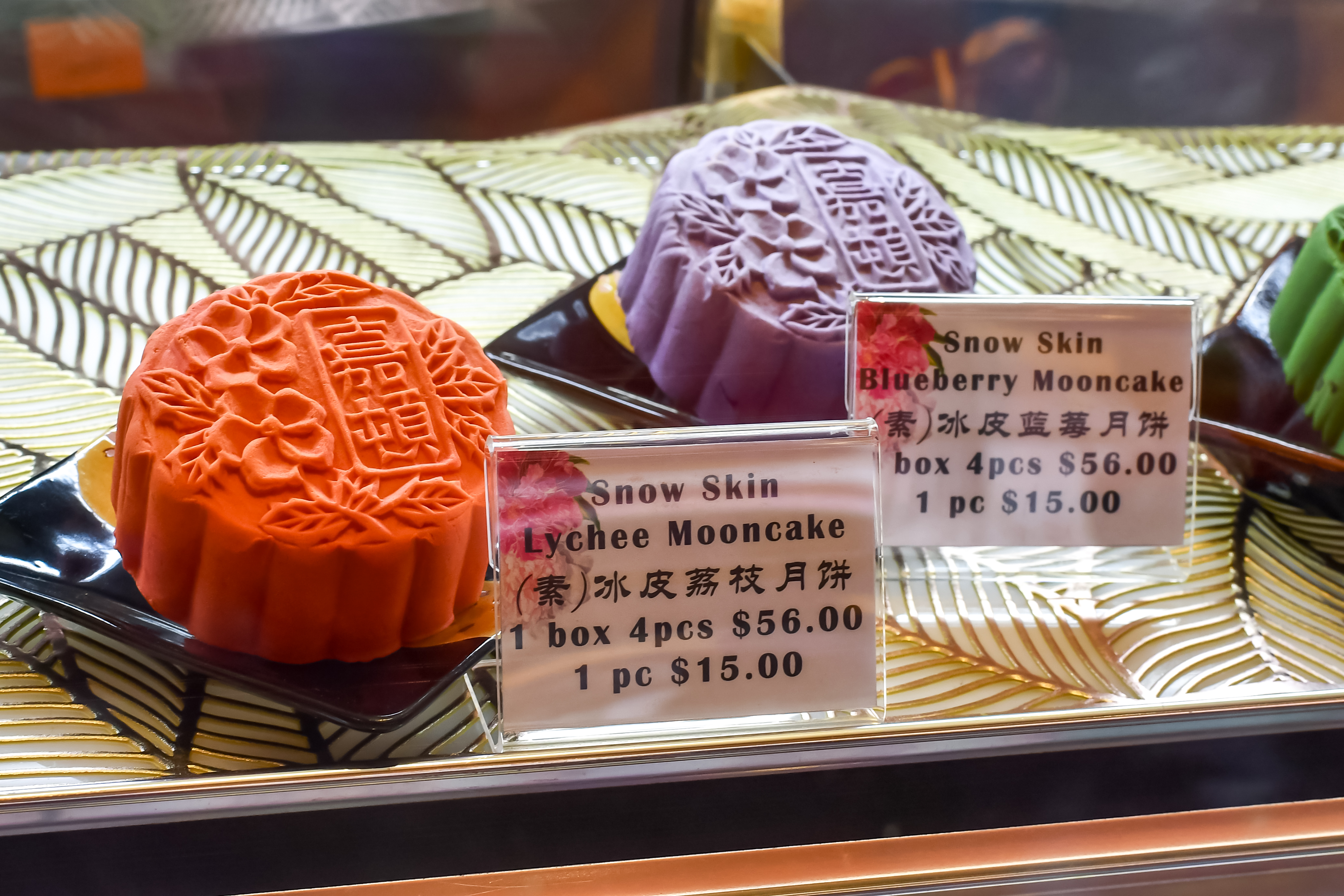
Snow skin fruity mooncakes

Traditional Chinese delicacies such as ginseng and edible bird's nest were soon followed by abalone and shark fin. Foreign food companies have also tried to cash in. Häagen-Dazs were one of the first to create an ice-cream mooncake, with a choice of either the "traditional," snow-skin, or Belgian/Swiss white, milk, and dark chocolate crusts. Other ice cream and restaurant chains soon followed up with their own versions. Other Western ingredients, including champagne ganache, malt whisky, volcanic-salt caramel and even black truffles, caviar and foie gras have made it into mooncakes.

=== Crusts ===
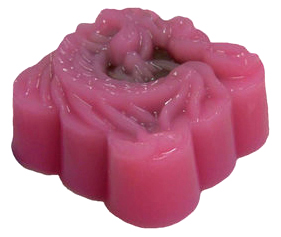
Pink jelly mooncake with red-bean paste filling

Snowy mooncakes first appeared on the market in the early 1980s. These non-baked, chilled mooncakes usually come with two types of crusts:

- Glutinous rice: A crust with texture similar to that of a mochi. This is a snow skin mooncake. These moon cakes are known colloquially as "snowskin mooncakes", "ice-skin mooncakes" or "snowy mooncakes" (冰皮 or 冰皮月餅).
- Jelly: A crust made of gelling mixtures such as agar, gelatin, or konjac and flavored with a wide variety of fruit flavorings.

== Use in other countries and regions ==
=== East Asia ===
==== Mongolia ====
Mooncakes are transliterated into Mongolian as yeven (еэвэн, ᠶᠧᠪᠢᠩ). Mooncakes in Mongolia are hearty with the crust made from wheat flour, barley and raisin is a popular filling.

==== Japan ====
Mooncakes in Japan are known as geppei (月餅), a transliteration of the Chinese name. Their designs are based on the Cantonese mooncake, are associated with Chinese culture and are sold all year round, mainly in Japan's Chinatowns. Azuki (red bean) paste is the most popular filling for these mooncakes, but other sorts of beans, as well as chestnut, are also used.

==== Taiwan ====
The most traditional mooncake found within Taiwan resembles those from southern Fujian. Taiwanese mooncakes are filled with sweetened red bean paste, sometimes with mochi in the center. The most common traditional mooncakes coming from Taiwan are filled mung bean (lu dou) or taro paste, generally with a salted duck egg yolk in the mung bean mooncakes, and either salted duck egg or a savory treat in the taro mooncakes. They typically have a flaky crust and are spherical in shape. Instead of the imprinted pattern on top common in Cantonese versions, Taiwanese mooncakes have a red stamp typically in celebratory Chinese character. Modern, more trendy Taiwanese moon cakes are wide in variety that includes low fat, lard free and ice cream versions. Popular modern flavors include green tea, chocolate, strawberry and tiramisu.

=== Southeast Asia ===
==== Indonesia ====
In Indonesia, there are several main types of mooncakes, from the traditional to the modern mooncakes. The traditional mooncake has been there ever since the Chinese and Japanese entered Indonesia, they are circular like a moon, white and thinner than regular mooncake. Fillings may include pork, chocolate, cheese, milk, durian, jackfruit and other exotic fruits made into a paste. This type of mooncake is widely available all year long while the regular modern mooncakes are usually only sold around the mid-autumn festival season.

As a Muslim-majority country, mooncakes are predominantly made with halal ingredients. The crust is typically made from vegetable oil or peanut oil and filled with mung bean paste.

==== Malaysia ====
There are three major cities that have diverse types of moon cakes; George Town, Kuala Lumpur and Sabah. Mooncakes are quite similar to the traditional Chinese. However, some prefer to add 100% pure Hunan lotus seed to maintain the quality of mooncakes. The most popular types, especially in Kuala Lumpur, are White Lotus Seed Paste Cake, Snow Skins and Black Sesame With Yolk.

==== Singapore ====
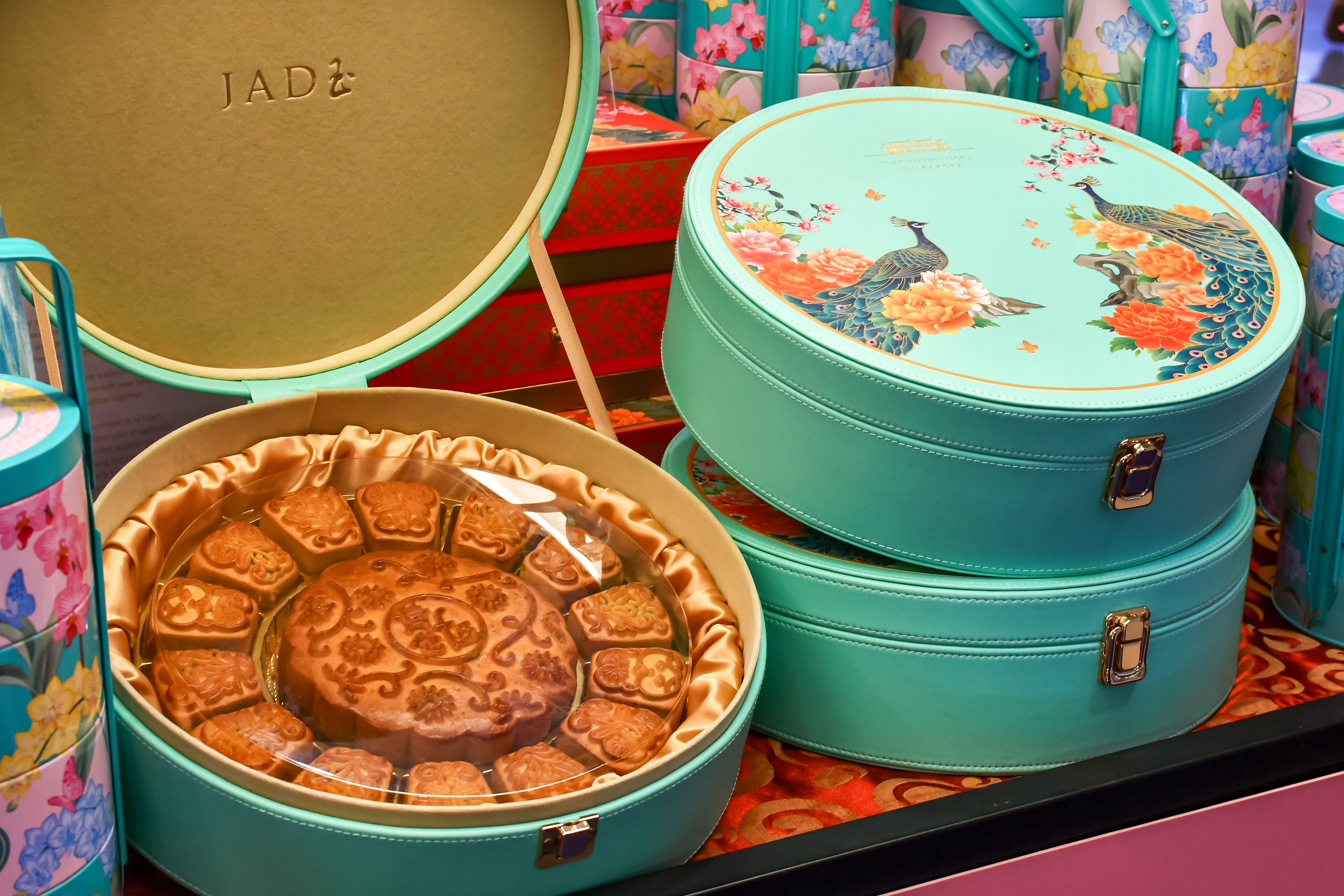
Mooncake gift set by a top hotel in Singapore

In Singapore, mooncakes are luxury gifts. They come in a wide variety of flavors ranging from the traditional baked ones, to the Teochew flaky ones filled with yam paste, to snowskin varieties filled with chilled fruit pastes. Traditional mooncakes feature base fillings of red lotus paste, white lotus paste or red bean paste, with 0-4 salted duck egg yolks embedded within. Variations include adding other ingredients such as macadamia nuts, osmanthus, orange peel and melon seeds.

Snowskin mooncakes in Singapore feature flavors ranging from Lychee Martini, Baileys, Matcha Red Bean, durian, and various fruit pastes.

Mooncakes are luxurious gifts in Singapore and are popular as gifts to clients, friends and family. An average box of 4 mooncakes cost US$60. A number of hotels and fine Chinese cuisine restaurants offer mooncakes packaged in elaborate boxes with multiple compartments and jeweled clasps. Mooncake boxes are commonly repurposed as jewelry boxes after the festival ends.

==== Thailand ====
In Thailand, mooncakes (in Thai, ขนมไหว้พระจันทร์) are sold in Thai-Chinese bakeries during festival season. In Bangkok, traditional and modern moon cakes are not limited to Chinatown on Yaowarat Road, but they are also found in stalls of large supermarkets.

==== Vietnam ====
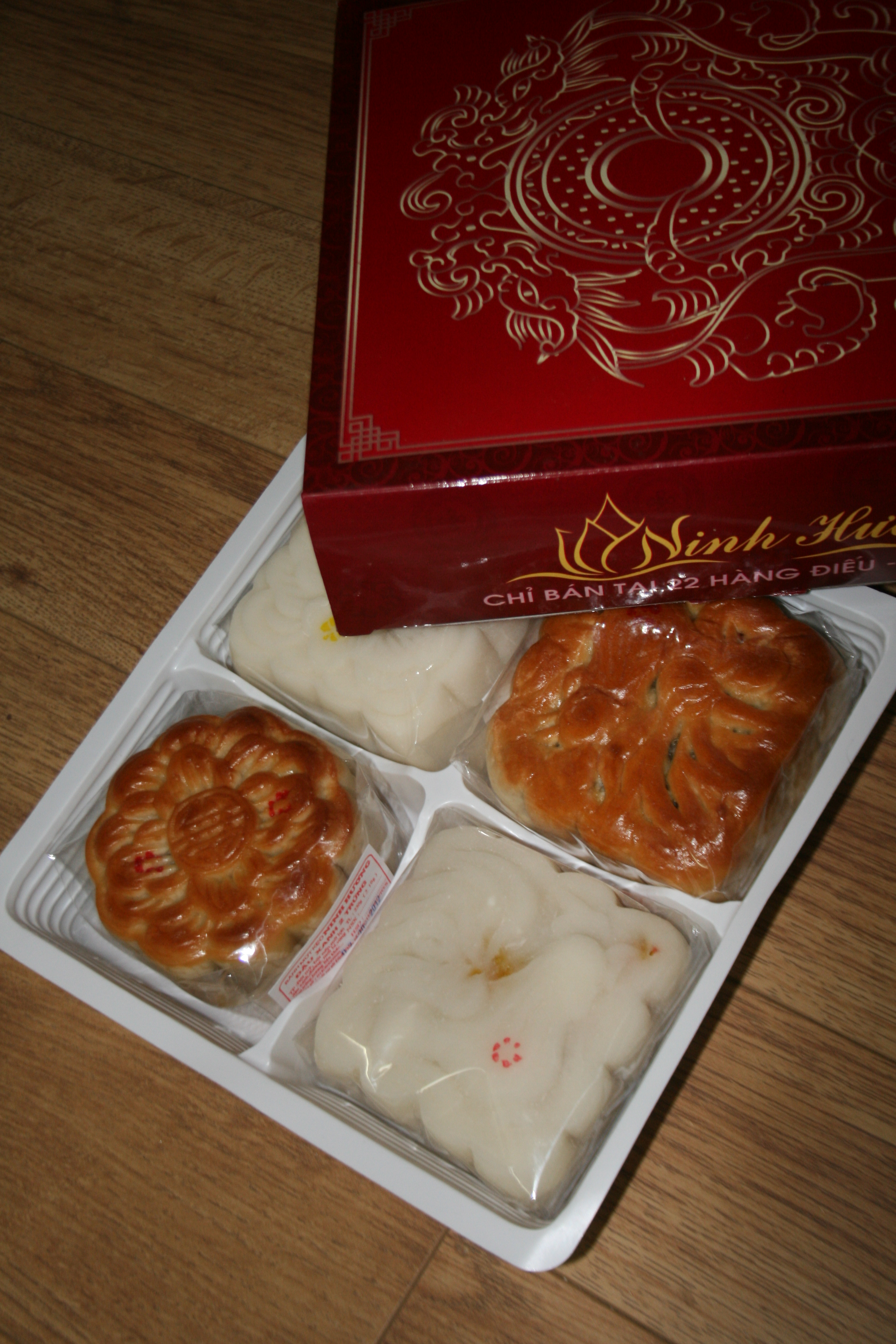
A box with bánh nướng (baked mooncake) and bánh dẻo (sticky rice mooncake)

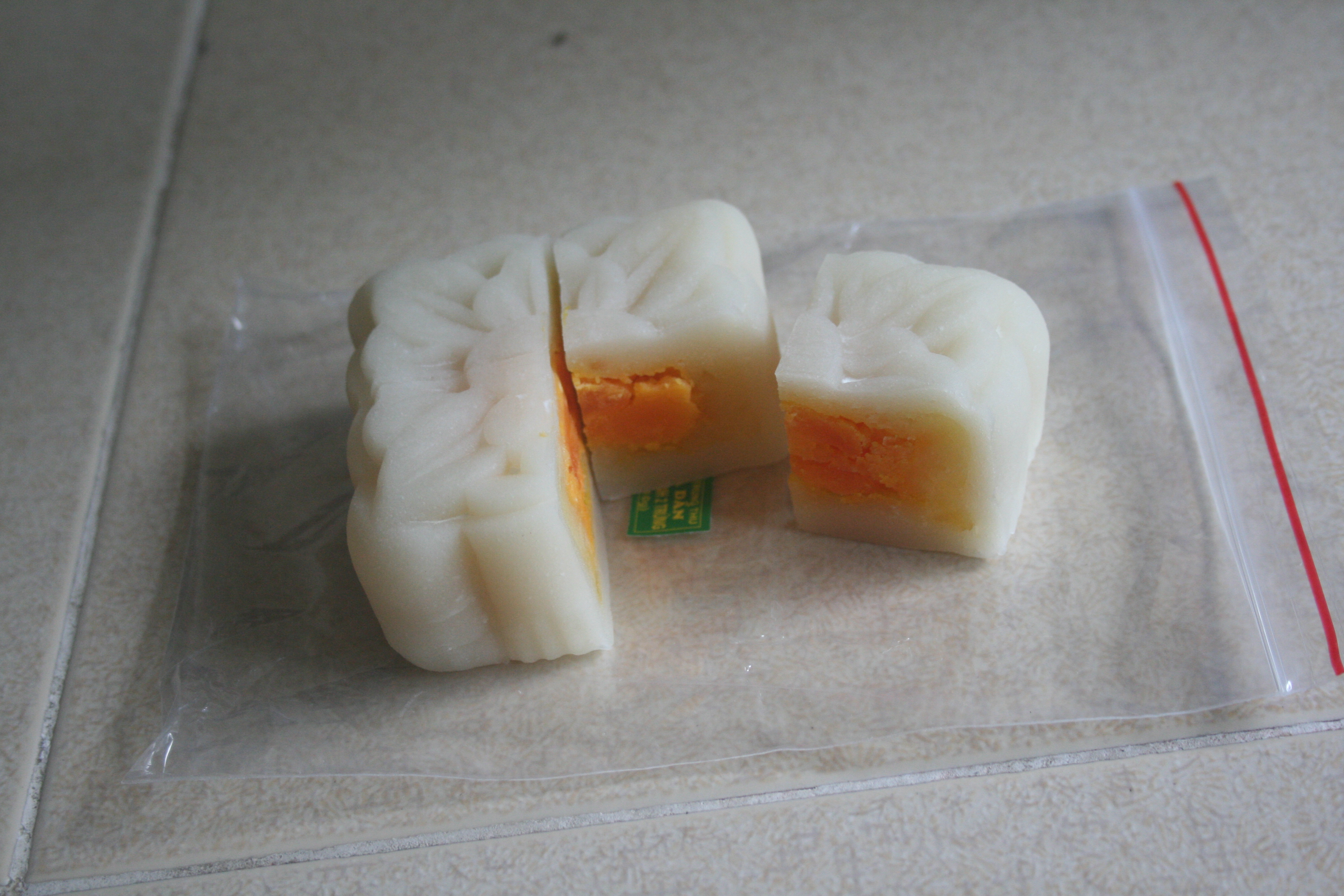
Vietnamese sticky rice mooncake with mung bean paste and salted egg yolk

In Vietnam, mooncakes are known as bánh trung thu (literally "mid-autumn cake"). Vietnamese mooncakes are usually sold either individually or in a set of four. There are two kinds of mooncake: bánh nướng (baked mooncake) and bánh dẻo (sticky rice mooncake).

It can be said that bánh nướng and bánh dẻo are two special kinds of cake in Vietnam. They are widely popular and are sold only during the Tết Trung Thu season. Vietnamese mooncakes are often in the shape of a circle (10 cm in diameter) or a square (a length of about 7–8 cm), and 4–5 cm thick. Larger sizes are not uncommon. Their designs largely resemble that of the Cantonese mooncake, though some other images, such as the sow with cub, fish, shrimp, etc. can also be found.

Vietnamese mooncakes have two basic parts: crust and filling. The ingredients usually consist of: jam, dried sausage, mung bean paste, salt, sugar, cooking oil, sugared lard, lotus seed, watermelon seed, etc. Compared to other variants, Vietnamese mooncakes' flavor is more on the sweet side. Thus, to balance it, salted egg yolk is often added. They can be baked or eaten immediately.

Bánh nướng (baked mooncake) is made from wheat flour, cooking oil, and simple syrup boiled with malt. After being filled with various combinations of salted egg yolk, dried sausage, mung bean paste, salt, sugar, cooking oil, sugared pig fat, lotus seed, watermelon seed, it will be brushed with egg wash, then baked in the oven. The egg wash will protect the crust of the cake from drying out and create the aroma of the cake. The cakes have to be rotated constantly in the oven to prevent burning.

Bánh dẻo (sticky rice mooncake) is easier to make than bánh nướng. The crust and filling are pre-cooked. The crust is made from roasted glutinous rice flour, pomelo blossom water or vanilla and simple syrup. After malaxating rice flour, fillings similar to that of baked mooncake is stuffed inside the crust and then the cake is put into the mold dusted with a thin layer of flour to prevent sticking to fingers. The cake can be used immediately without any further steps. However, bánh dẻo is not as popular as bánh nướng.

== Gallery ==
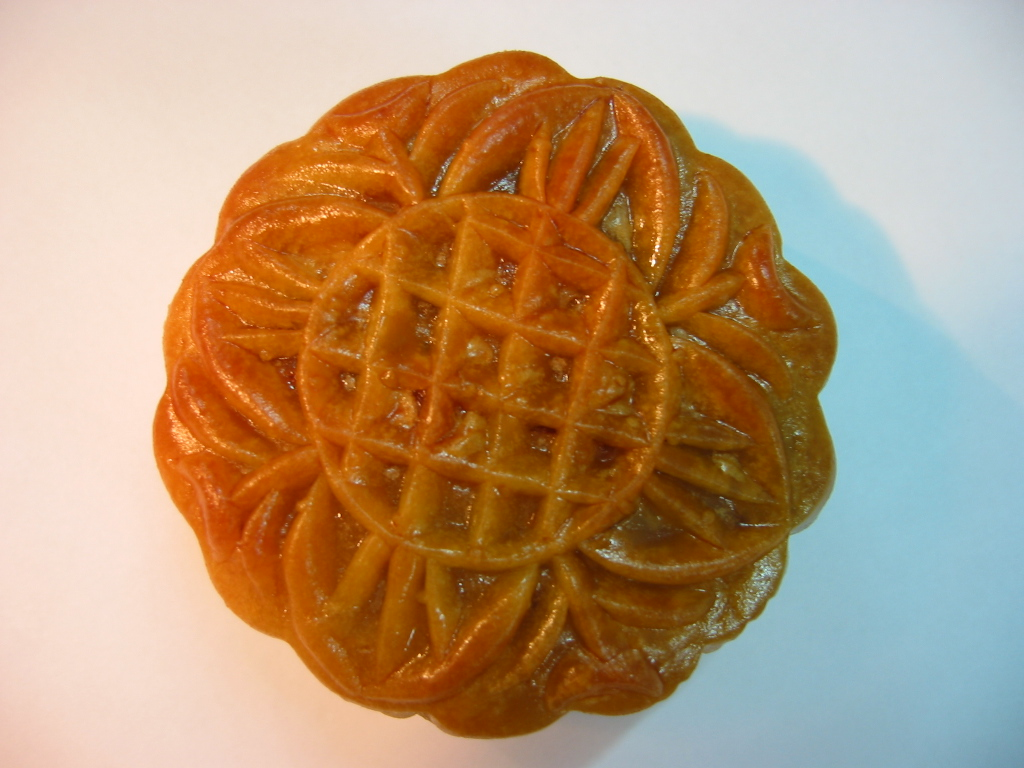
Baked moon cake from Vietnam

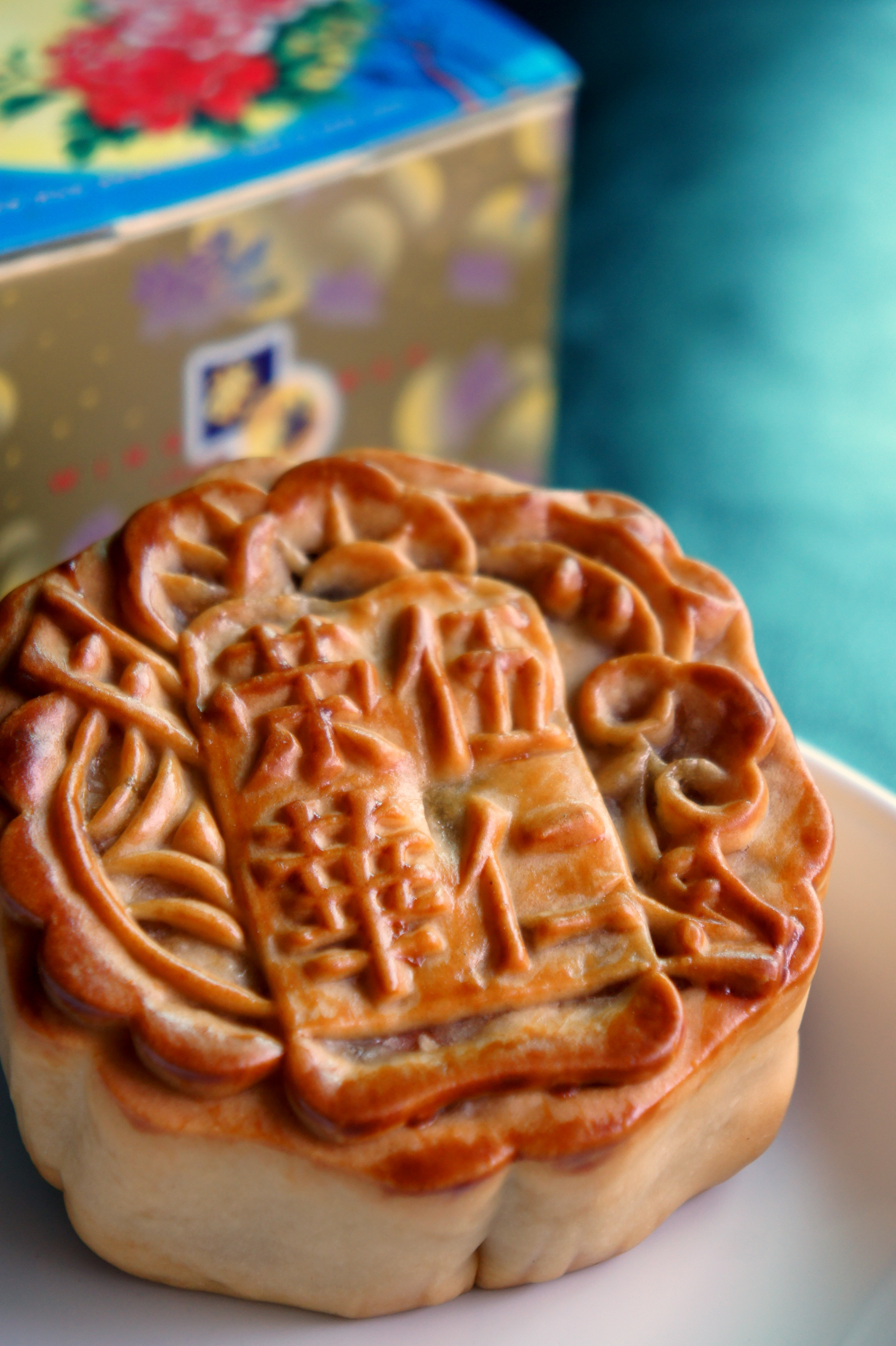
Commercial brand Mooncake

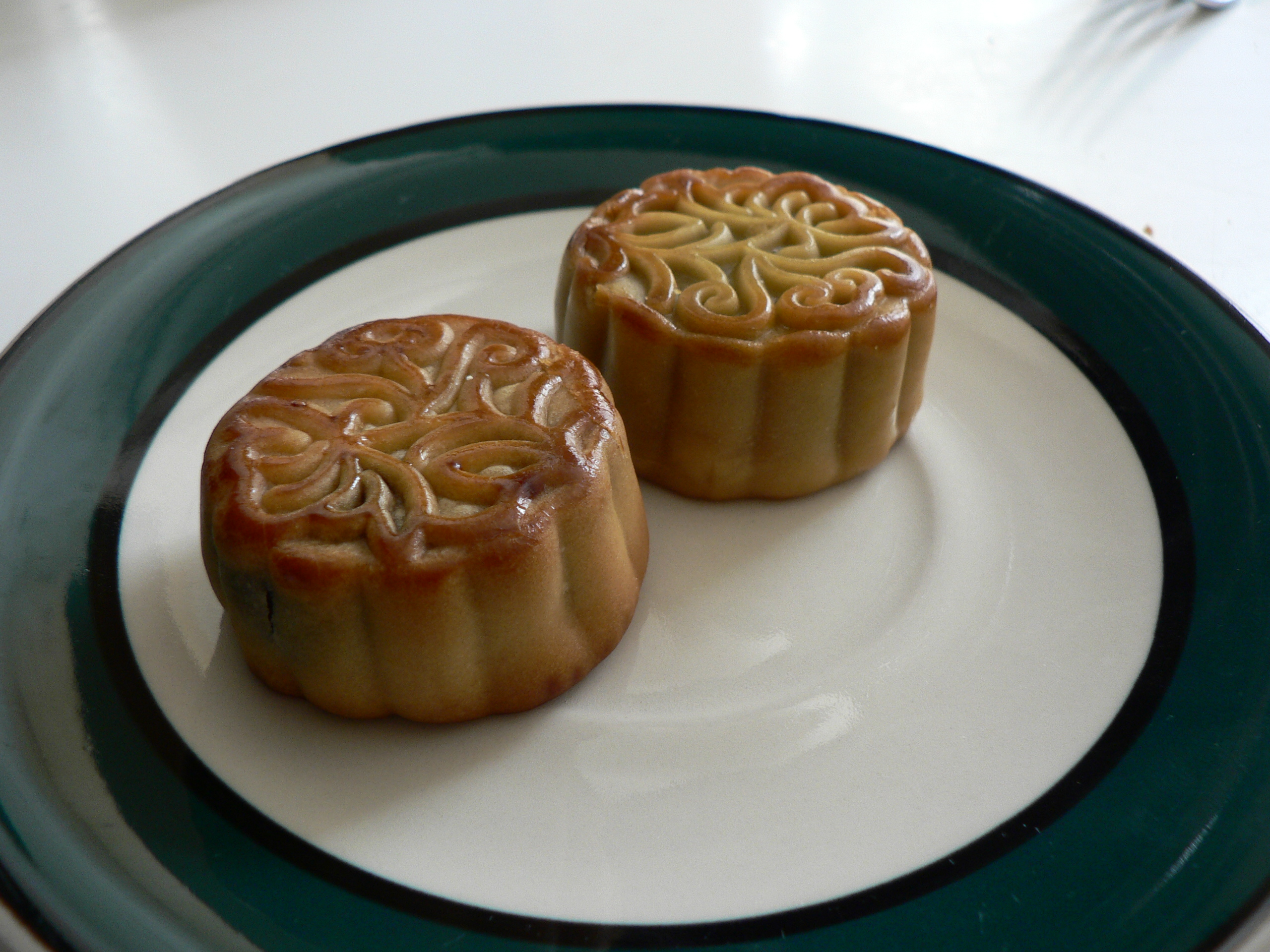
Mooncakes

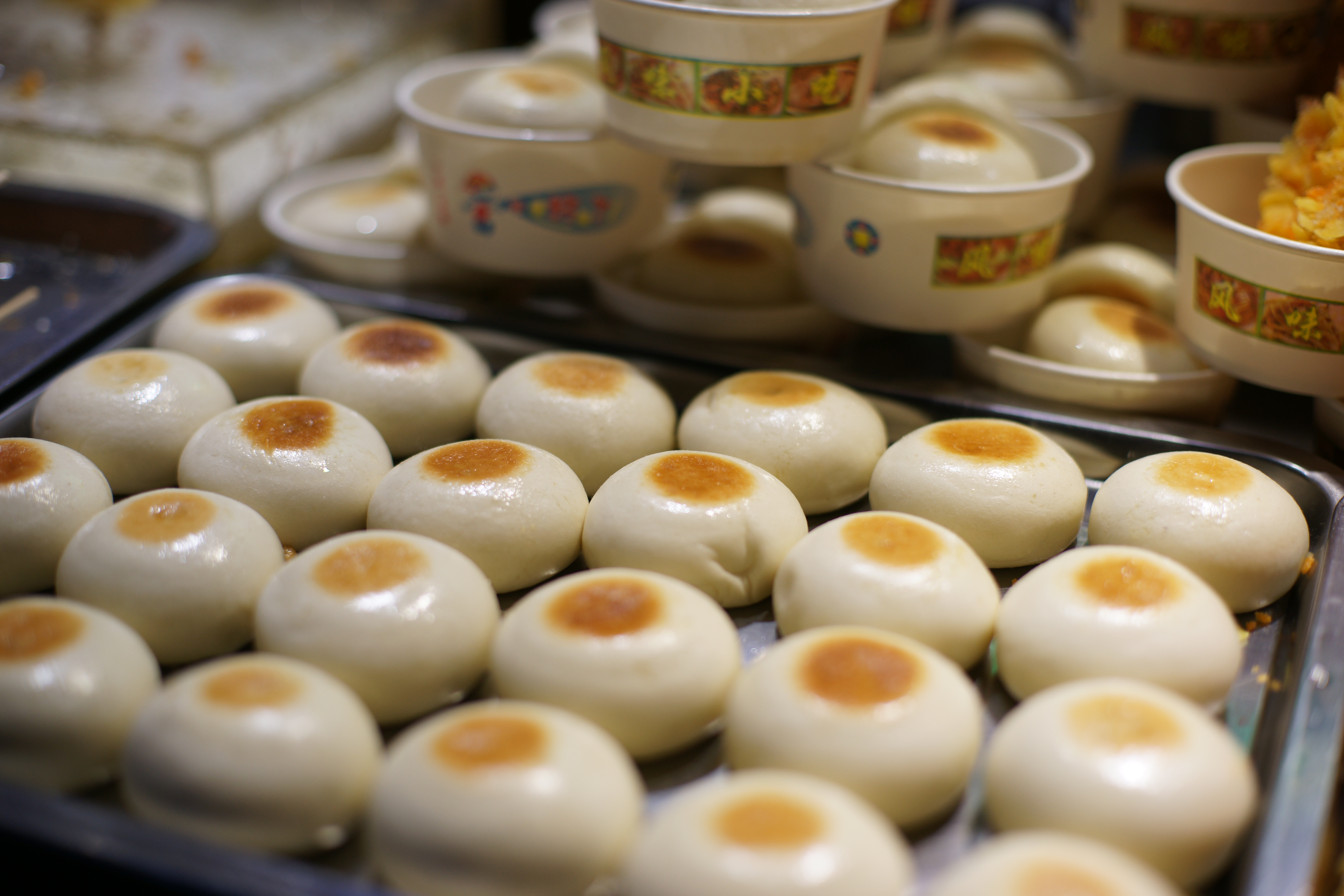
Mooncakes in Chengdu

== See also ==
- Bakpia (Hopia)
- Bánh pía – Vietnamese pastry
- Crystal cake – Chinese dessert
- List of Chinese desserts
- Lotus seed paste – Chinese dessert ingredient
- Nian gao – Chinese food
- Suncake (Taiwan) – Taiwanese flaky cakes filled with maltose
- Yueguangbing – Traditional Hakka mooncake
