= Lotus seed paste =

Chinese dessert ingredient

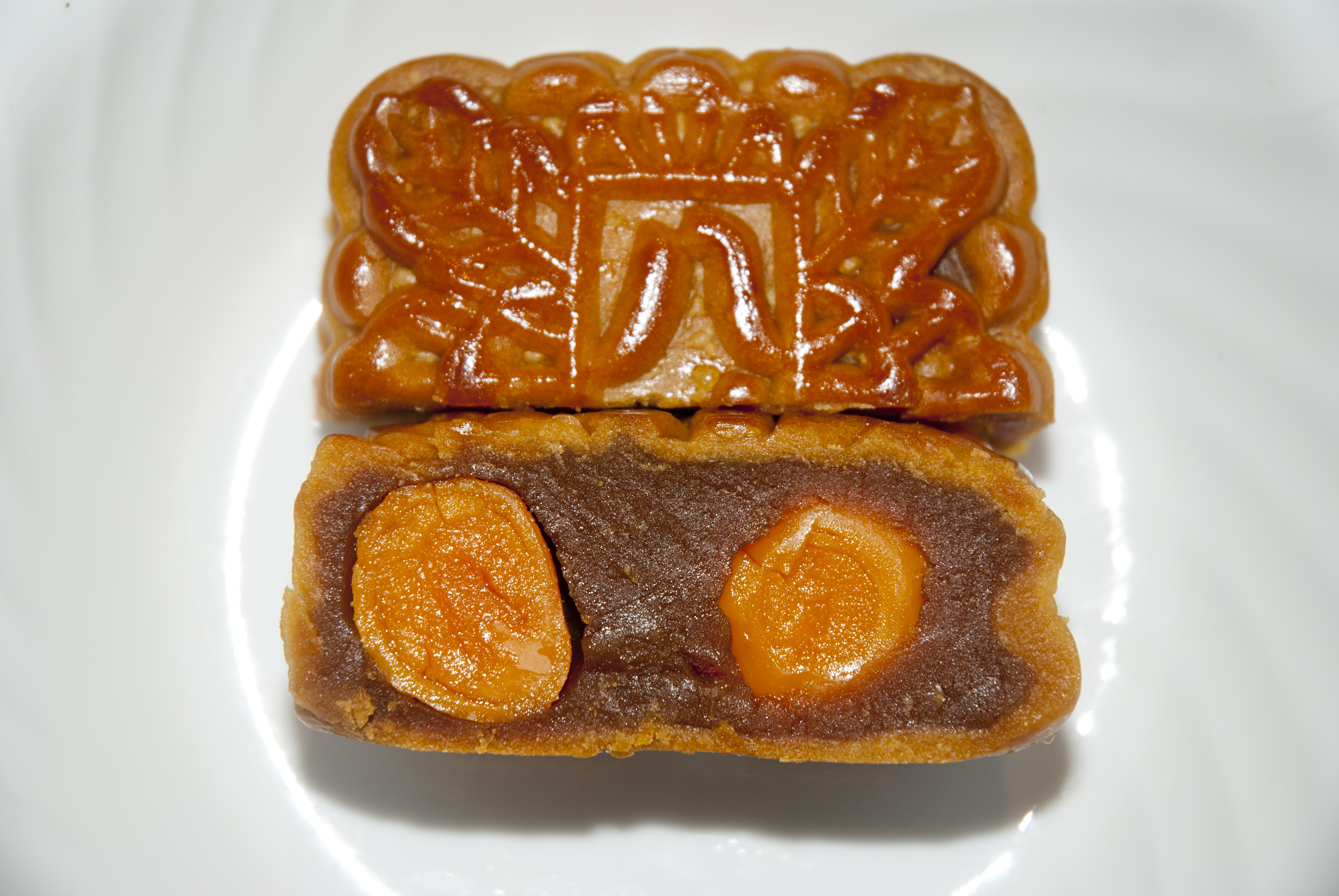
- Mooncake with salted duck egg yolks and lotus seed paste filling.
- Simplified Chinese: 莲蓉
- Traditional Chinese: 蓮蓉
- Literal meaning: lotus velvet
- IPA: [ljɛ̌n ɻʊ̌ŋ]
- Yale Romanization: lìhn yùhng
- Jyutping: lin4 jung4
- IPA: [lin˩ jʊŋ˩]

Lotus seed paste is a Chinese dessert ingredient made from dried lotus seeds. It is traditionally considered a luxurious ingredient.

== Production ==
The process for making the paste is similar to that of smooth red bean paste. First, the dried seeds are stewed in water until soft prior to being mashed into a fine paste. The paste is then watered down to a thin slurry and passed through a sieve and into cheesecloth, with which it is squeezed dry. This produces a fine crumbly paste, which is then mixed with sugar or other sweeteners and, often, oil to produce a smooth, sweet paste.

== Use ==
=== China ===
The lotus paste used by most Chinese cooks requires further preparation by dry cooking the sweetened paste over heat with caramelized sugar and vegetable oil. This produces a lotus paste that is tan in colour with a satiny sheen. It is also rich, sweet, silky with a slight fragrance of caramel. Some cooks choose to treat the dried lotus seeds with a lye solution before initially stewing them in order to shorten their cooking time.

Lotus paste is used in Chinese cuisine as a filling for mooncake, baozi, and other sweet pastries. Another common use of lotus paste is as a filling for lotus seed buns, a dim sum item.

Due to the high price of lotus seeds, commercially prepared lotus pastes may also contain white kidney bean paste as its filler. There are several variations, some of which are darker, close to black in color. These usually have a deeper taste.

== See also ==
- Sweet bean paste
