= Water chestnut cake =

Cantonese dim sum dish

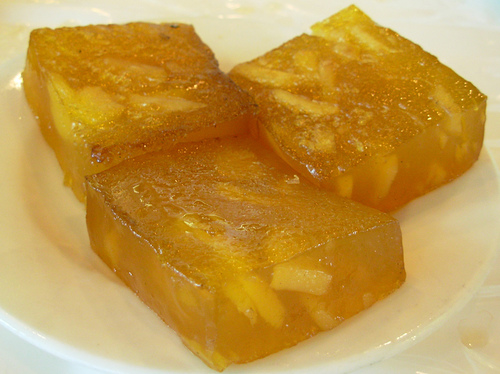
- Course: dim sum
- Place of origin: Guangdong, China
- Region or state: Cantonese-speaking areas
- Main ingredients: shredded Chinese water chestnut

Water chestnut cake
- Traditional Chinese: 馬蹄糕
- Simplified Chinese: 马蹄糕
- Jyutping: maa5 tai4 gou1
- Hanyu Pinyin: mǎtí gāo
- Literal meaning: horsehoof cake
Transcriptions
Standard Mandarin
- Hanyu Pinyin: mǎtí gāo
- IPA: [màtʰǐkáʊ]
Yue: Cantonese
- Yale Romanization: máhtài gōu
- Jyutping: maa5 tai4 gou1
- IPA: [ma˩˧tʰɐj˩kɔw˥]
Southern Min
- Hokkien POJ: bé-tê-koé or bé-tê-ké

Water chestnut cake (traditional Chinese: 馬蹄糕; simplified Chinese: 马蹄糕; Cantonese Yale: máhtài gōu) is a sweet Cantonese dim sum dish made of shredded Chinese water chestnut. When served during dim sum, the cake is usually cut into square-shaped slices and pan-fried before serving. The cake is soft, but holds its shape after the frying. Sometimes the cake is made with chopped water chestnuts embedded into each square piece with the vegetable being visible. One of the main trademark characteristics of the dish is its translucent appearance.

It is one of the standard dishes found in the dim sum cuisine of Guangdong, and is also available in select overseas Chinatown restaurants.

== See also ==
- Chestnut cake
- Brazil nut cake
- Dim sum
- Taro cake
- Turnip cake
- Nian gao
