= Carrot cake (disambiguation) =

Carrot cake is cake that contains carrots mixed into the batter.

Carrot cake may also refer to:

- Turnip cake, a type of Cantonese dim sum called carrot cake in Singapore
