= Turnip cake =

Dim sum dish

Radish cake
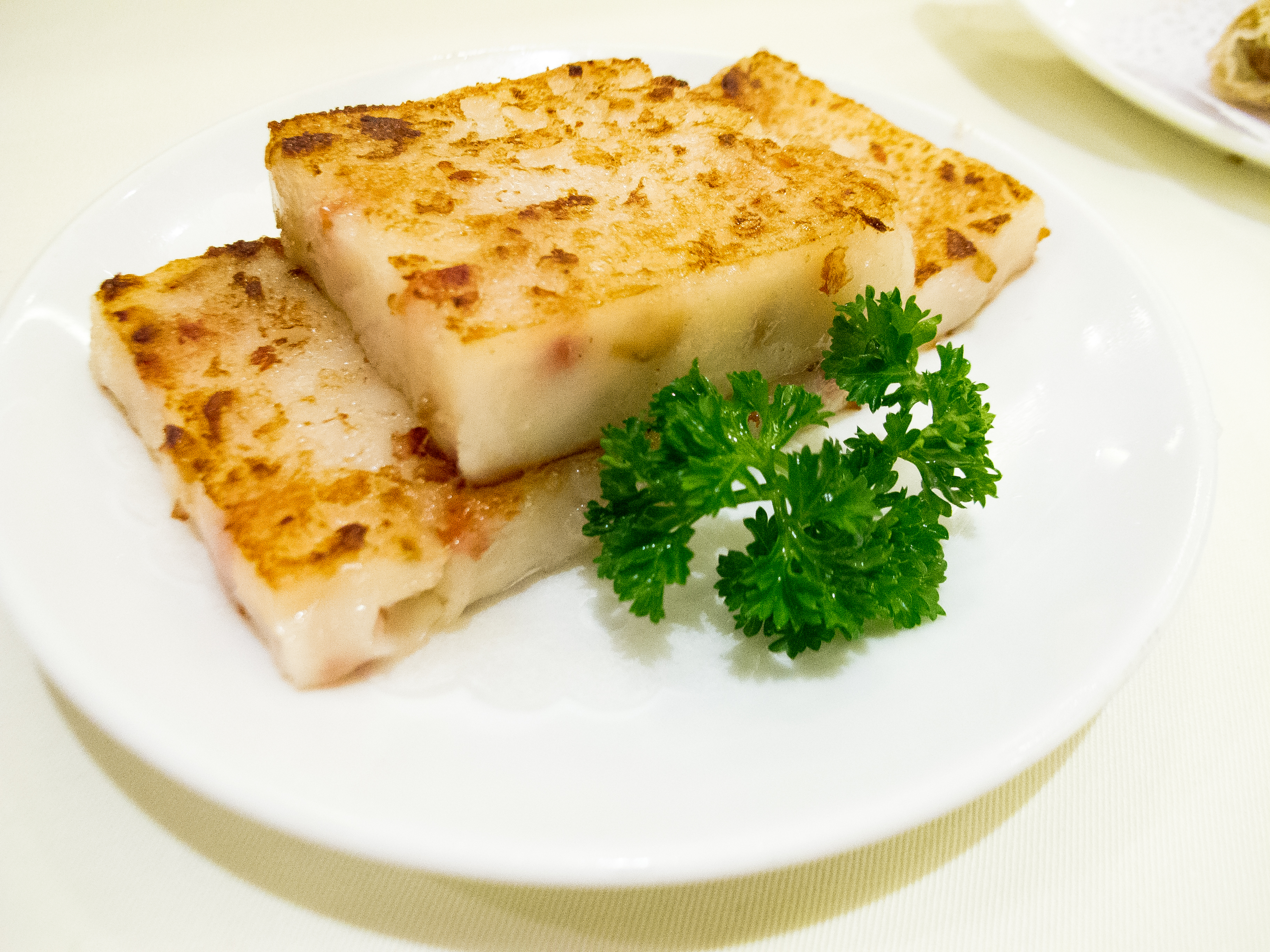
- Alternative names: Turnip cake, chai tow kway, carrot cake
- Course: Dim sum, yum cha
- Place of origin: East and Southeast Asia
- Region or state: Southern China (Chaoshan, Guangdong and Hong Kong), Taiwan, and Southeast Asia
- Associated cuisine: Chinese
- Main ingredients: Shredded daikon radish, plain rice flour
- Variations: pan fried, steamed, stir fried

Turnip cake

Chinese name
- Traditional Chinese: 蘿蔔糕
- Simplified Chinese: 萝卜糕
- Literal meaning: radish cake
Transcriptions
Standard Mandarin
- Hanyu Pinyin: luóbo gāo
- IPA: [lwǒpwokáʊ]
Yue: Cantonese
- Yale Romanization: lòbaahk gōu
- Jyutping: lo⁴ baak⁶ gou¹
- IPA: [lɔ˩pak̚˨kɔw˥]

Chai tow kway
- Traditional Chinese: 菜頭粿
- Simplified Chinese: 菜头粿
- Hokkien POJ: chhài-thâu-kóe, chhài-thâu-ké
Transcriptions
Southern Min
- Hokkien POJ: chhài-thâu-kóe, chhài-thâu-ké
- Teochew Peng'im: tshài-thâu-kué
Eastern Min
- Fuzhou BUC: chái-tàu-guōi

Second alternative Chinese name
- Chinese: 菜頭粄
Transcriptions
Hakka
- Pha̍k-fa-sṳ: chhoi-thèu-pán

Burmese name
- Burmese: အော်ကေ့ကျီ
- IPA: [ɔ̀kḛʧì]

Vietnamese name
- Vietnamese: bánh củ cải

Thai name
- Thai: ขนมผักกาด
- RTGS: khanom phak kat

Radish cake, turnip cake or chai tow kway (Note: Also chye tow kway, chye tow kueh, chai tau kueh etc.) is a Chinese dish made of steamed rice flour and shredded daikon radish often served as dim sum. It is traditionally called carrot cake in Singapore, but has no relation to European carrot cake. Radish cake is commonly served in Cantonese and Teochew (Chaoshan) yum cha, usually cut into rectangular slices and sometimes pan-fried before serving. Each pan-fried cake has a thin crunchy layer on the outside from frying, and is soft on the inside, whereas the steamed version is soft all over. Often served with a soya-oyster dipping sauce, it is one of the standard dishes found in the dim sum cuisine of China and is widely consumed in Indonesia, Singapore, Malaysia, Thailand, Taiwan and Vietnam, as well as in overseas Chinatown restaurants. In Southeast Asia, the cakes are often chopped into smaller cubes and stir fried with additional ingredients.

== Names ==
In Chinese, radish cake is most commonly called luóbo gāo (蘿蔔糕) in Mandarin Chinese, lòbaahk gōu (蘿蔔糕) in Cantonese and chhài-thâu-ké (菜頭粿) in Hokkien. The latter is the source of the name "chai tow kway" that is commonly used in English in Southeast Asia.

Luóbo (蘿蔔) is a common name for the daikon radish (Raphanus sativus var. longipinnatus), often more specifically called báiluóbo (白蘿蔔; "white daikon radish"). The suffix gāo (糕) refers to "cake" in a very broad sense and includes various cakes, loafs and pastes, whether sweet or savoury, such as nian gao. Likewise, the Hokkien chhài-thâu (菜頭) is the daikon radish, while the -ké or -kóe (粿) suffix is used for various steamed rice or tapioca cakes.

In Hakka, it is referred to as lò-phe̍t-pán (蘿蔔粄) or chhoi-thèu-pán (菜頭粄), with the suffix -pán (粄) used to refer to snacks or cakes made from glutinous rice flour.

Though the turnip (Brassica rapa subsp. rapa) is a different plant from a radish, the common English name "turnip cake" likely arose because white daikon radishes were largely unknown outside of East and Southeast Asia and the name "turnip" was applied due to their similar appearance.

In Chinese, the carrot is often referred to as "red radish" (Note: nb Mandarin hóngluóbo (紅蘿蔔), Cantonese hùhnglòhbaahk (紅蘿蔔) and Hokkien âng-chhài-thâu (紅菜頭)) As a result, the English word "carrot" has been transferred to the daikon radish in Singapore and Malaysia and the name "fried carrot cake" or simply "carrot cake" came to be applied to the radish cake, though it is unrelated to the sweet European carrot cake. This misnomer gave the title to a popular 2010 guidebook on Singapore's street food, There's No Carrot in Carrot Cake by Ruth Wan, Roger Hiew and Leslie Tay.

== Background ==
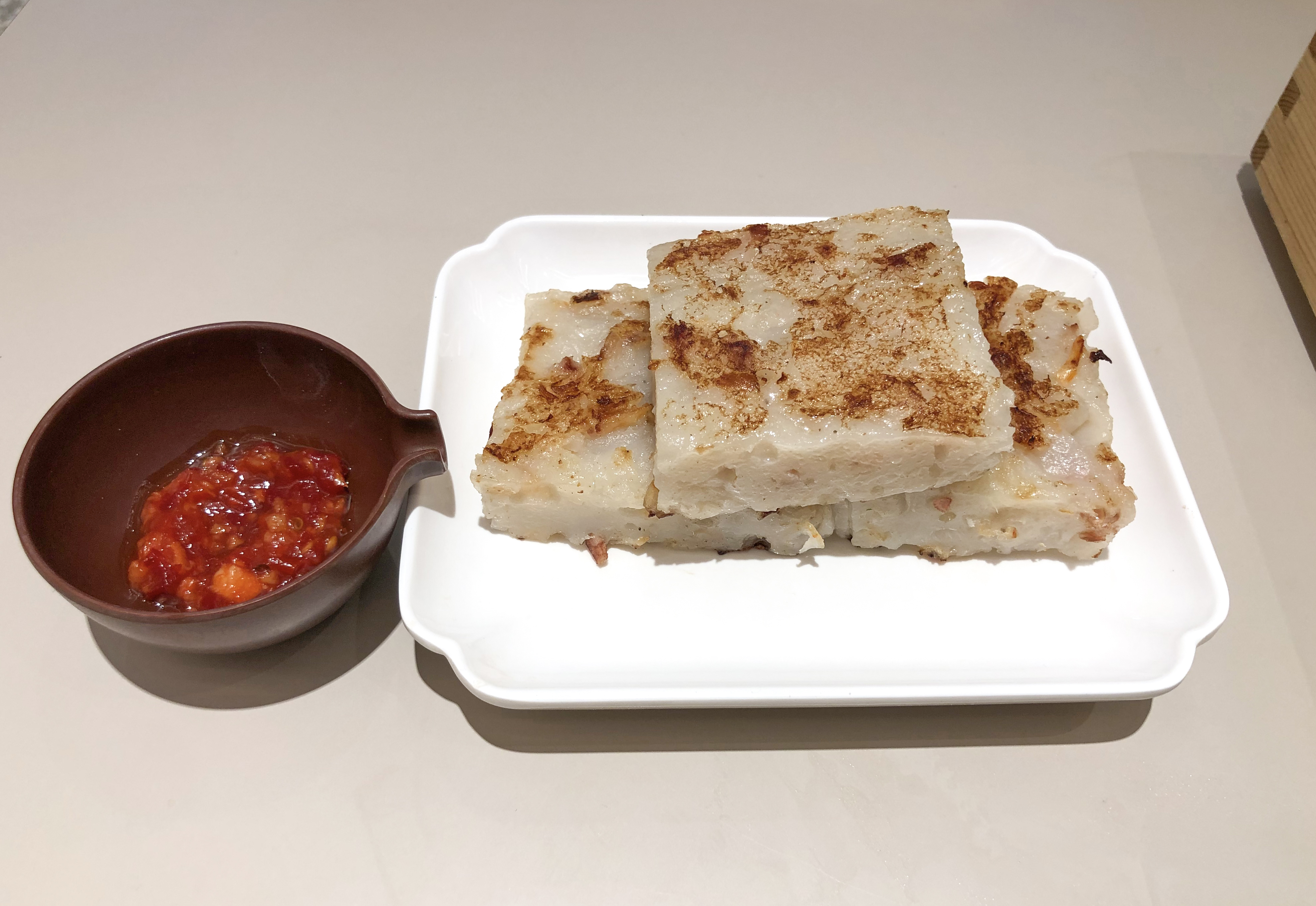
Radish cake as dim sum

In Taiwan, one story explaining the popularity of the dish and its significance at the Lunar New Year goes back to the 17th century Qing takeover of Taiwan. Before his suicide in the face of this takeover, exiled pretender to the Ming throne Zhu Shugui bequeathed farmland that he owned to local farmers. In gratitude, these people and their descendants secretly went to his grave venerate him, using radish cakes as one of their offerings on his death anniversary, on his birthday and at the Lunar New Year. This veneration of the last Ming claimant was conducted in secret and passed down through the generations until the end of Qing rule in 1895. Subsequently, eating radish cakes spread throughout Taiwan. Daikon radishes were largely a winter crop in Taiwan, making radish cakes a seasonal specialty, but innovations in cultivation and development of new radish varieties in the 20th century have allowed it to become a year-round favorite.

In Hong Kong, it is speculated that the association of the dish with the Lunar New Year arose from radishes being cheaper and of better quality in the winter.

Singapore Infopedia ascribes the dish in that country to Teochew (Chaoshan) immigrants from China to Singapore. The original dish, called bí-ko (米糕, "rice cake") or simply ko-kóe (糕粿 "(rice) cake") was made from rice flour and milled puffed rice but no radish. In Singapore, it became known as char kueh (炒粿 "fried rice cake"), where it was cut into cubes and stir-fried with dark soya sauce. A new name, chai tow kway, is self-attributed by hawker Ng Soik Theng, when she added radish to the cakes in the 1960s. Hawker Lau Goh then became famous for a light soya sauce version in the 1970s.

== Preparation ==
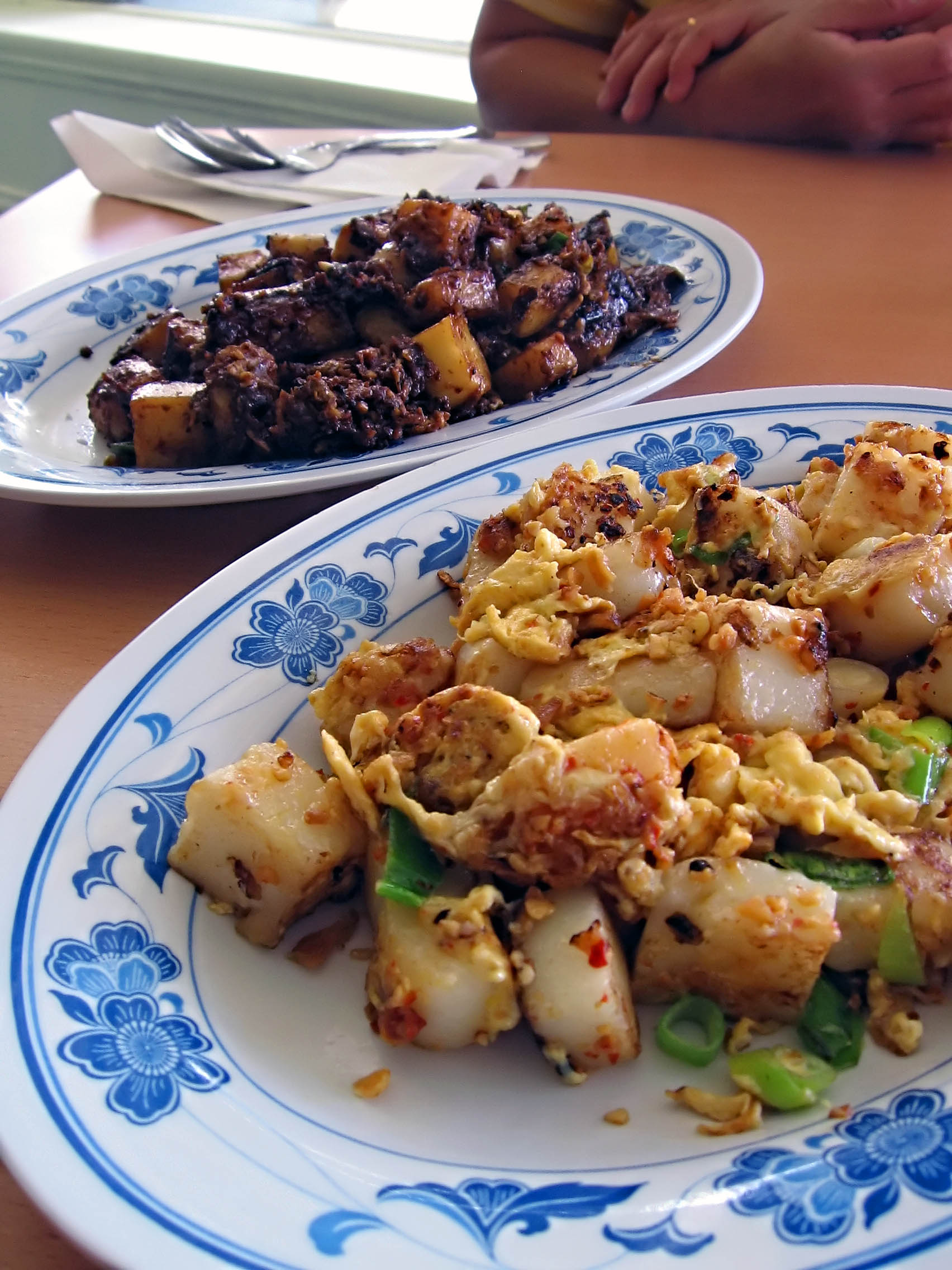
Radish cake made into "black" (with dark soya sauce) and "white" (salt and fish sauce) styled chai tow kway

To prepare a radish cake, daikon roots are first shredded. Chinese radish, either the white-and-green variety or the all-white variety, is one of the key ingredients since it makes up a large portion of the cake. The other key ingredients are water and rice flour. Corn starch is sometimes added as it aids in binding the cake together, especially when a large number of additional ingredients (see list below) are added. The ingredients are stirred together until combined.

Additional ingredients that provide umami flavouring can be also added. They include diced or minced pieces of:

- Dried shrimp
- Dried shiitake
- Chinese sausage
- Jinhua ham

These flavouring ingredients may first be stir-fried before being added to the radish and flour/starch mixture. Somewhat more luxurious cakes will add larger amounts of these ingredients directly to the mixture. Cheaper variants, especially those sold in dim sum restaurants, will often have just a sprinkling on top to keep costs down.

This mixture is then poured into a steamer lined with greased aluminum foil or cellophane, and steamed at high heat for 40 to 60 minutes until it solidifies into a gelatinous mass.

The radish cake is often served in large rectangular slabs which are steamed and then later fried whole.

As chai tow kway, it is steamed and then stir-fried in a wok with eggs, preserved radish (chai poh [菜脯]), and other seasonings. It is commonly served topped with spring onions (scallions). In hawker stalls, it is sometimes served wrapped in a banana leaf and may be eaten with a bamboo skewer.

== Variations ==
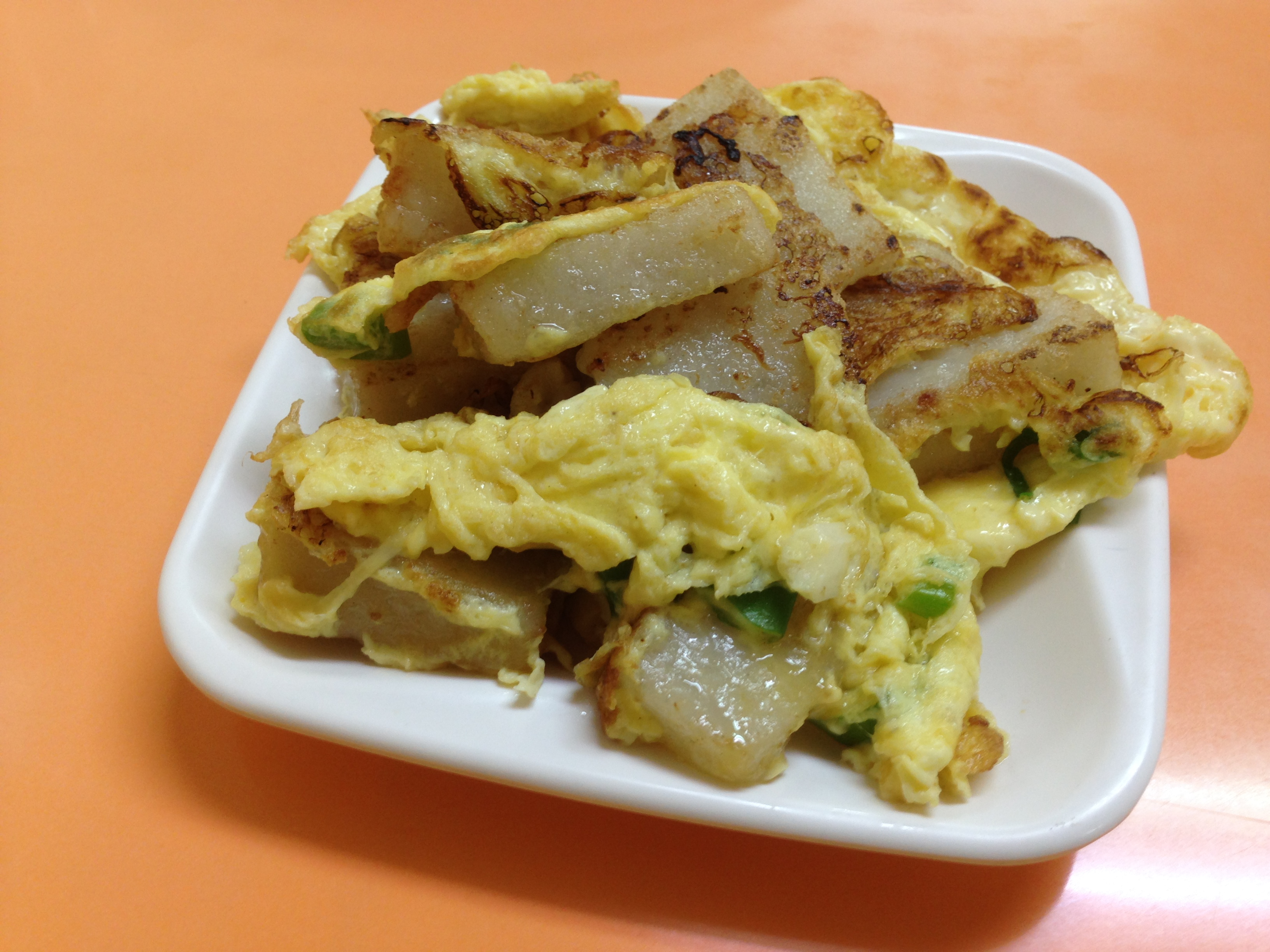
Radish cake slices fried in egg and spring onions

Although the steamed radish cakes can be consumed plain dipped in soya sauce, they are commonly cooked again to add additional flavors. For instance, they can be sliced into rectangular pieces when cooled and then pan-fried until both sides turn golden. They are then served with chili sauce and/or hoisin sauce on the side as condiments.

The Cantonese radish cake typical of dim sum restaurants is soft and often filled with other ingredients. Taiwanese radish cake is firmer with fewer other ingredients mixed in.

Radish cake can also be stir-fried and made into the dish chai tow kway. In Singapore, however, it is more commonly cut into pieces and stir-fried with eggs, garlic, spring onions (scallions) and occasionally shrimp (both dried and fresh). There are two variants: the "white" version uses a light soya sauce and/or fish sauce, and the radish cake is fried on top of a beaten egg to form a crust; the "black" version uses sweet dark soya sauce, and the egg is simply mixed in with the radish cake. Sometimes the cubes of radish cake and ingredients are all cooked together as a large omelette or pancake.

The versions served by hawkers in Singapore and Johor in southern Malaysia, where Teochew people live, are typically prepared by frying the radish cake with chopped preserved daikon, diced garlic, eggs, and Chinese fish sauce in place of soya sauce. Chopped spring onions are added just before serving. Further northwards in Malaya (e.g. in Kuala Lumpur), the same dish is darker due to the use of dark soya sauce, and bean sprouts are added. In Penang, this darker version is known as char koay kak (Note: Also char kway kak, char kueh kak etc.) (炒粿角; chhá-kóe-kak; "fried [rice] cake cubes"). Darker versions are seldom served in Singapore but are more common in Malaysia.

Taro cakes closely resemble radish cakes, and alternatives to the rice flour and radish chai tow kway include those made of taro or solely of rice flour, the latter common in Malaysia. For those with allergies to radishes, some recipes substitute turnip for radish.

== Cultural significance ==
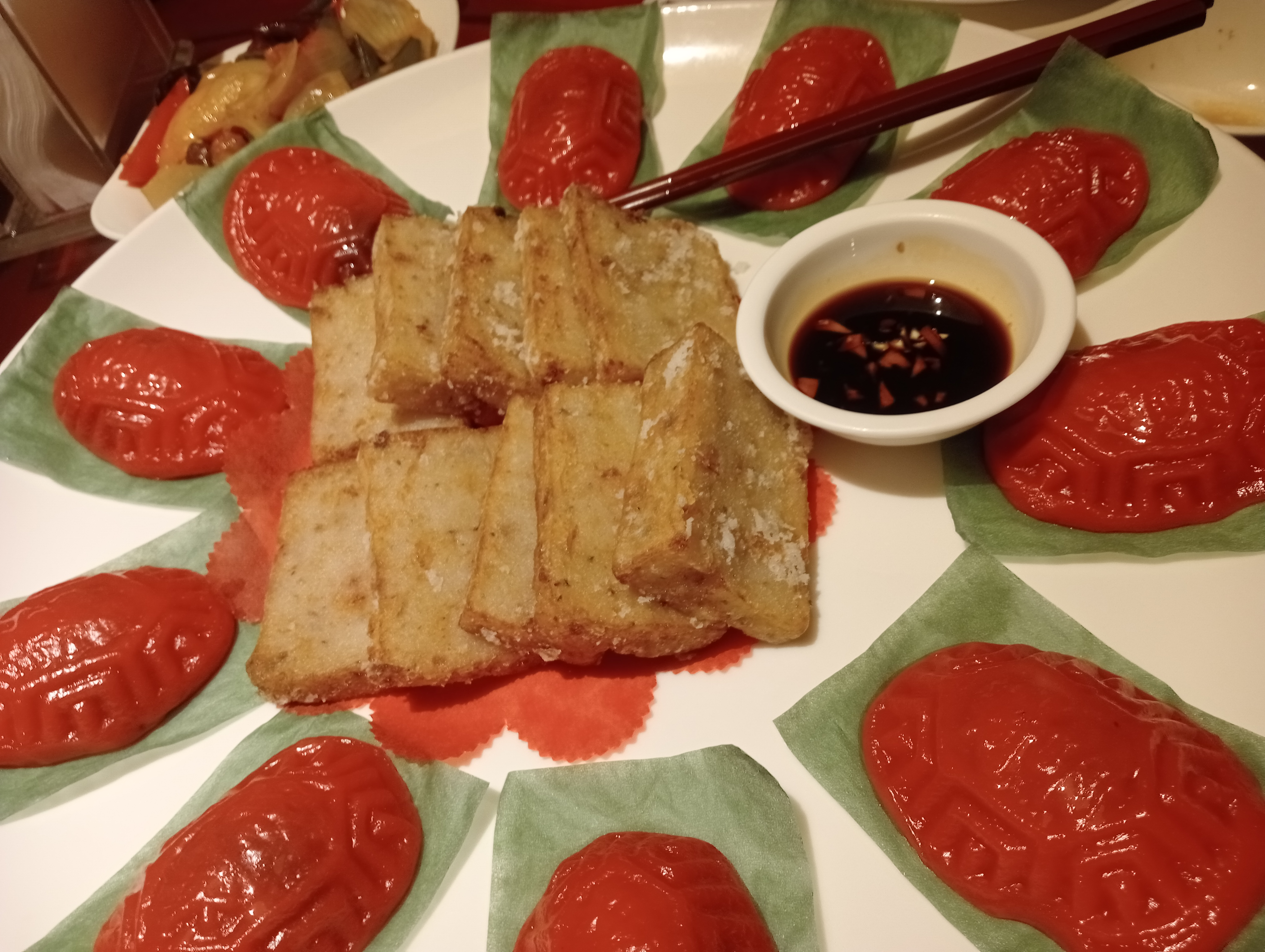
Auspicious food: radish cake slices surrounded by ang ku kueh (red tortoise cakes) in Taiwan

In Taiwan, radish cake is often eaten during the Lunar New Year, since the word for radish (菜頭; chhài-thâu) is a near homophone for "good fortune" (好彩頭; hó-chhái-thâu) in the Hokkien language. For reasons that are less clear it is also a popular dish for the Chinese New Year among Cantonese, although the gōu (糕) of lòbaahk gōu (蘿蔔糕) is a homophone of gōu (高) meaning "high" and indicating a wish for rising prosperity in the new year (cf. nian gao).

The dish is common in Singapore and Malaysia, eaten by Teochews as well as people of various dialects and races, and served in both hawker stalls and in Chinese restaurants. It is regularly served at varying times of the day.

In Taiwan, radish cake is also commonly eaten as part of breakfast, and is sometimes battered with egg and (re-)fried (雞卵菜頭粿).

== Gallery ==
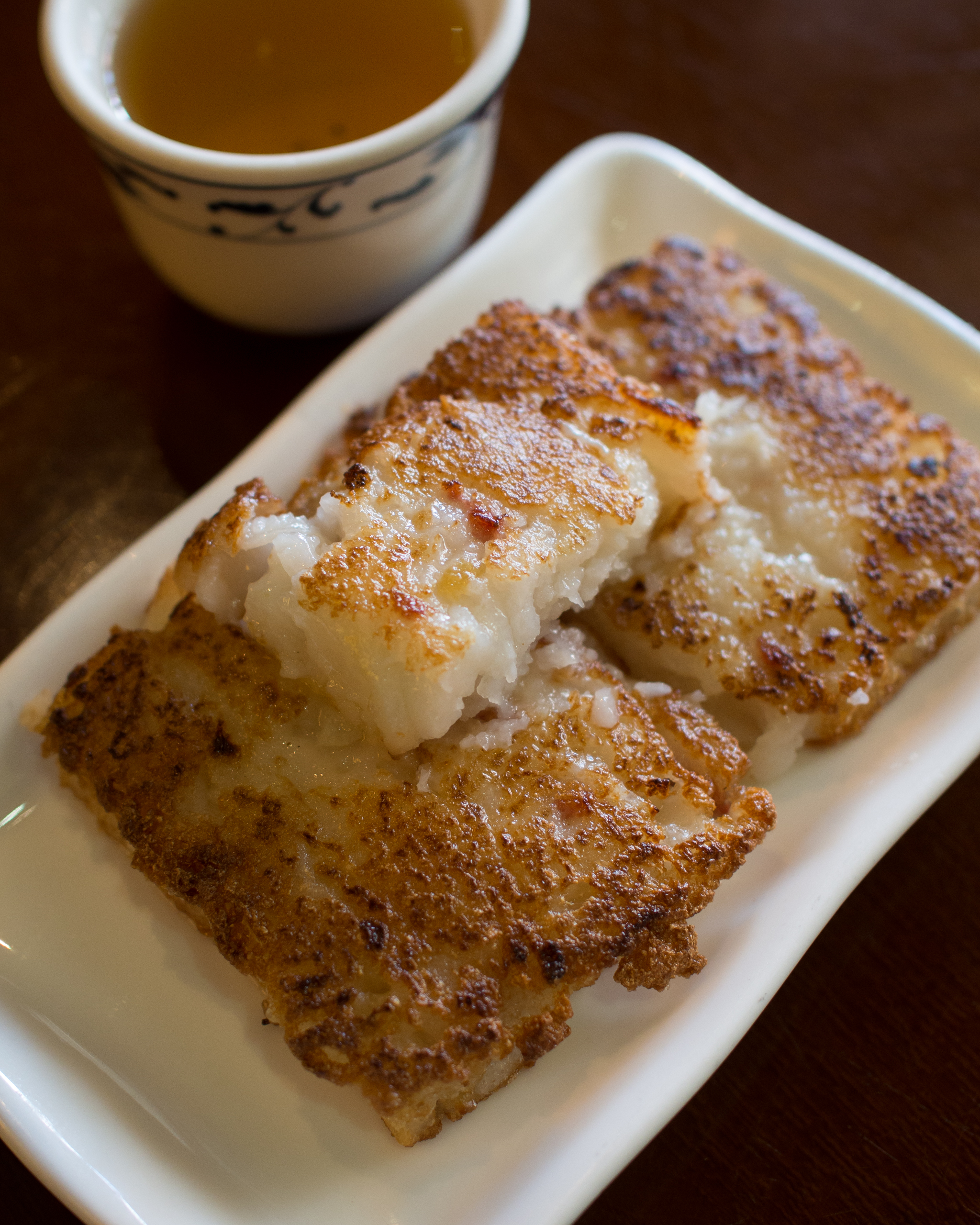
Radish cake in the Hague, Netherlands

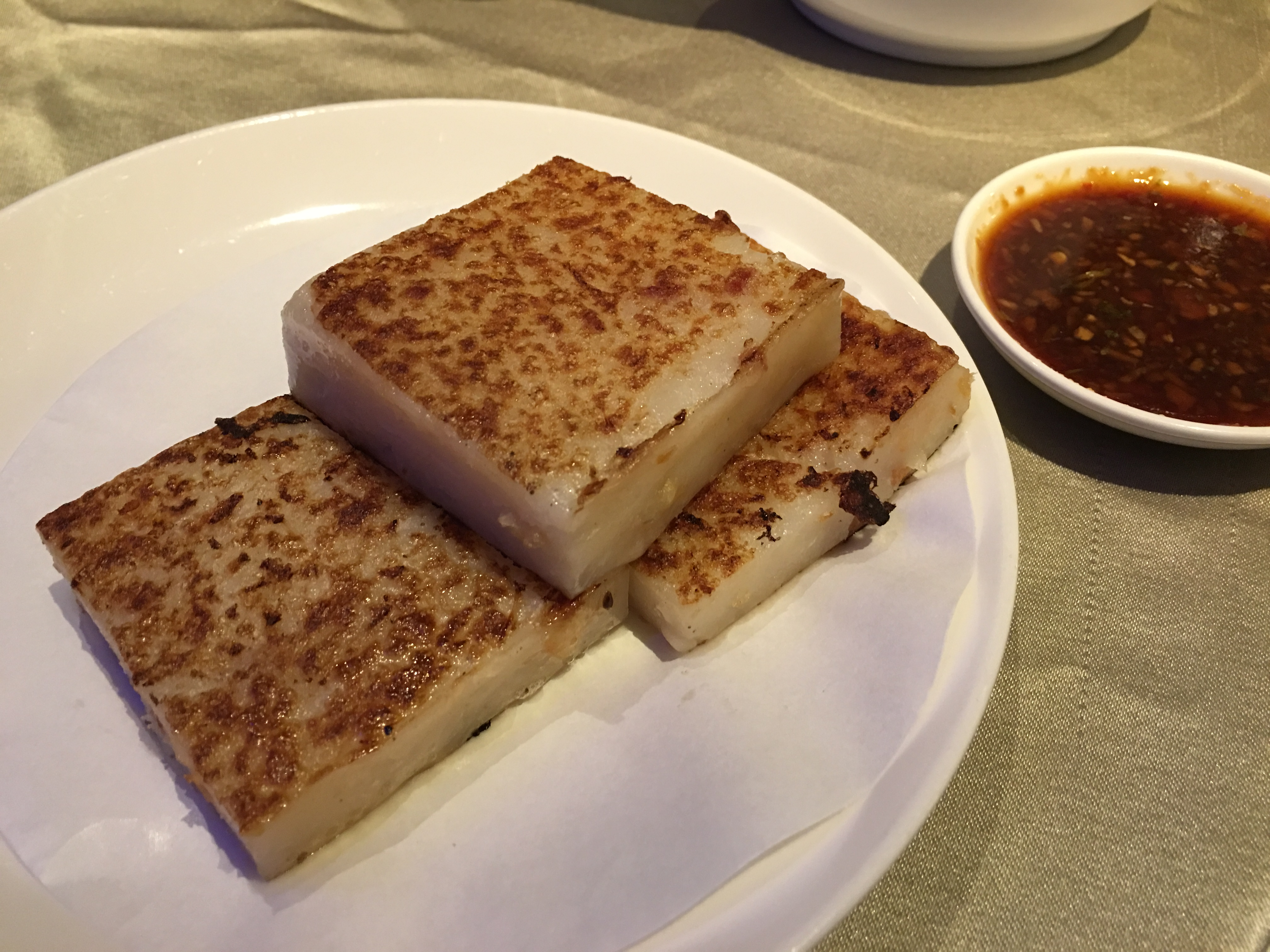
Radish cake with dipping sauce in Taiwan

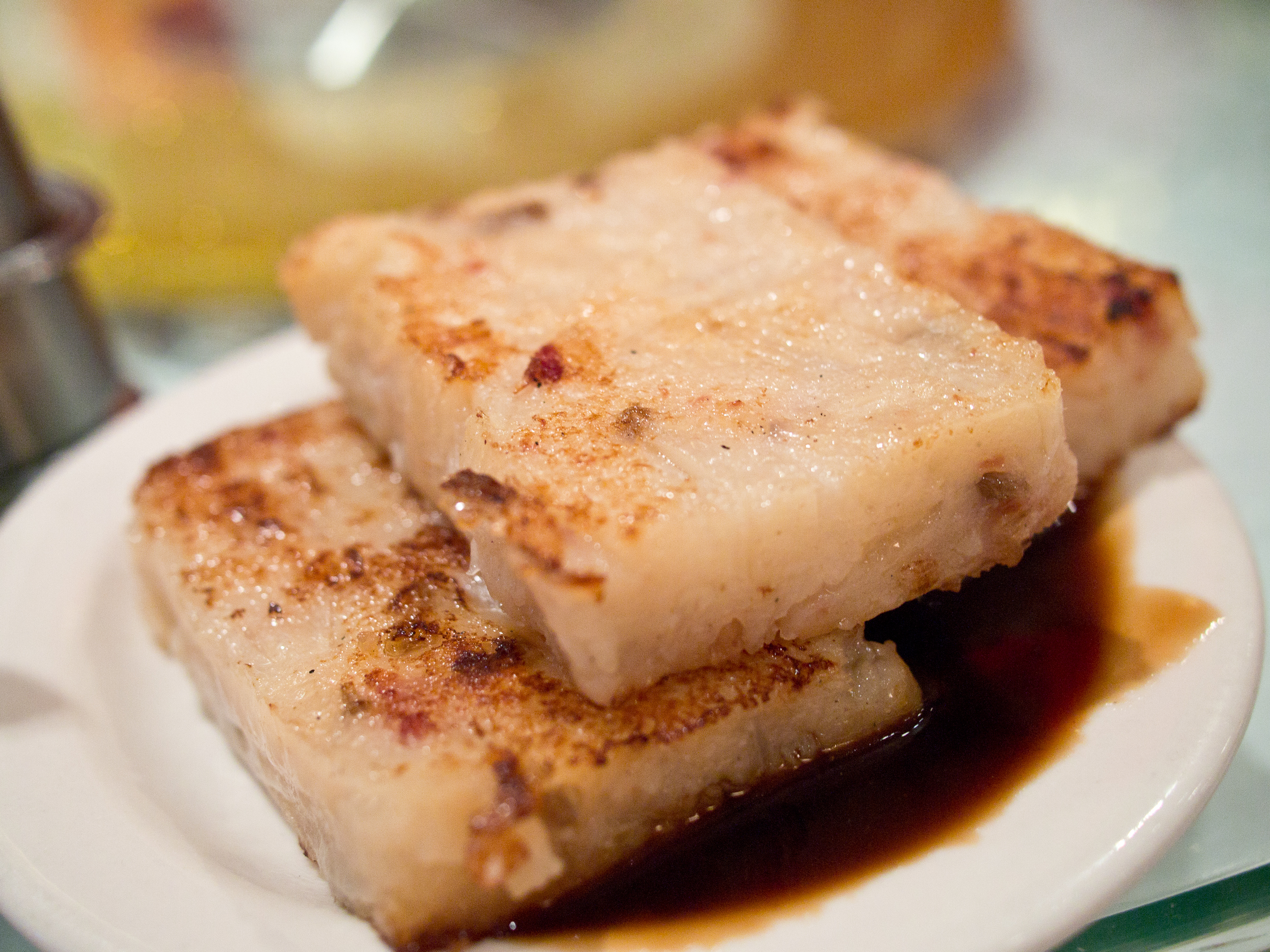
Radish cake in Cleveland, Ohio, USA

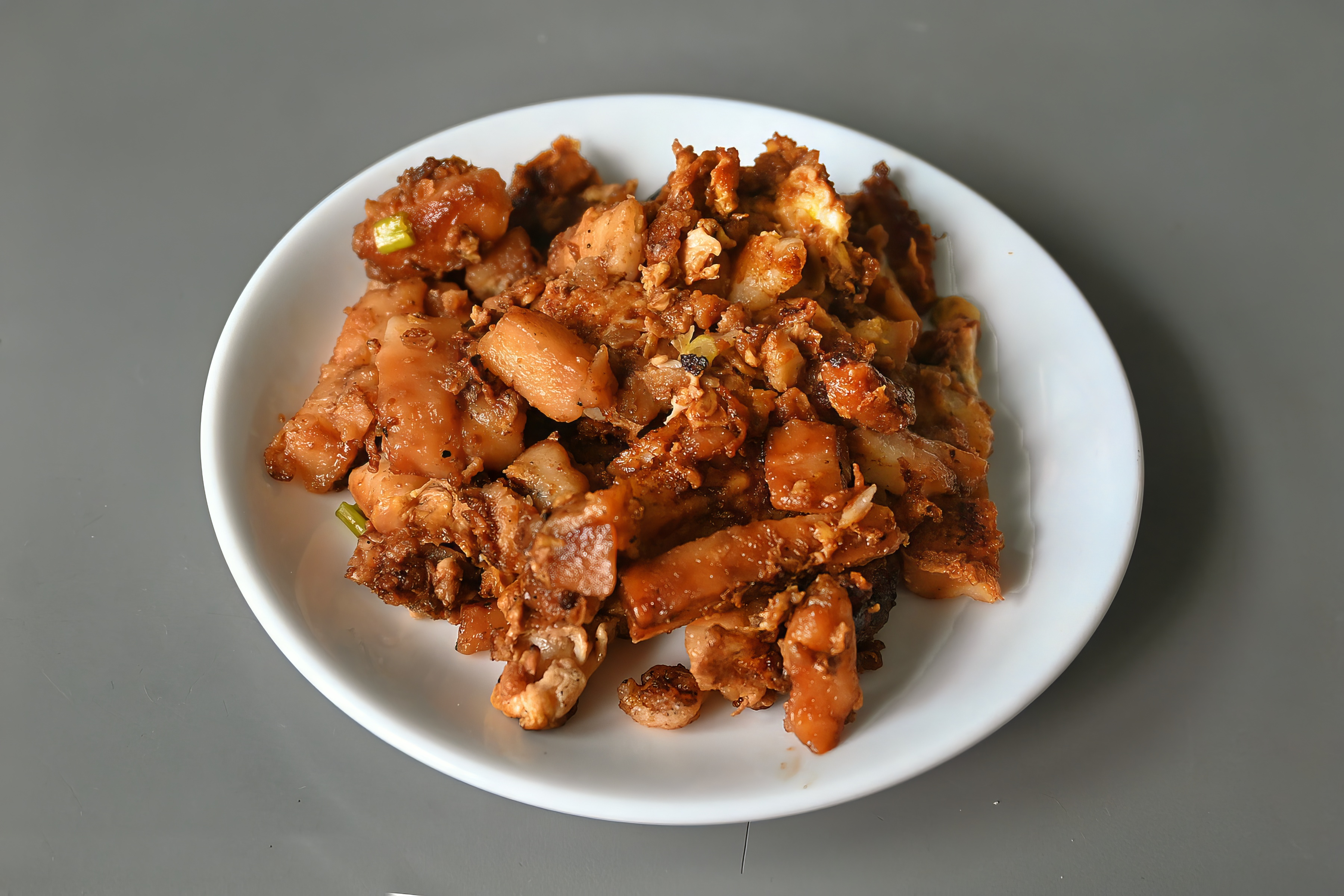
Chai tow kway in Singapore

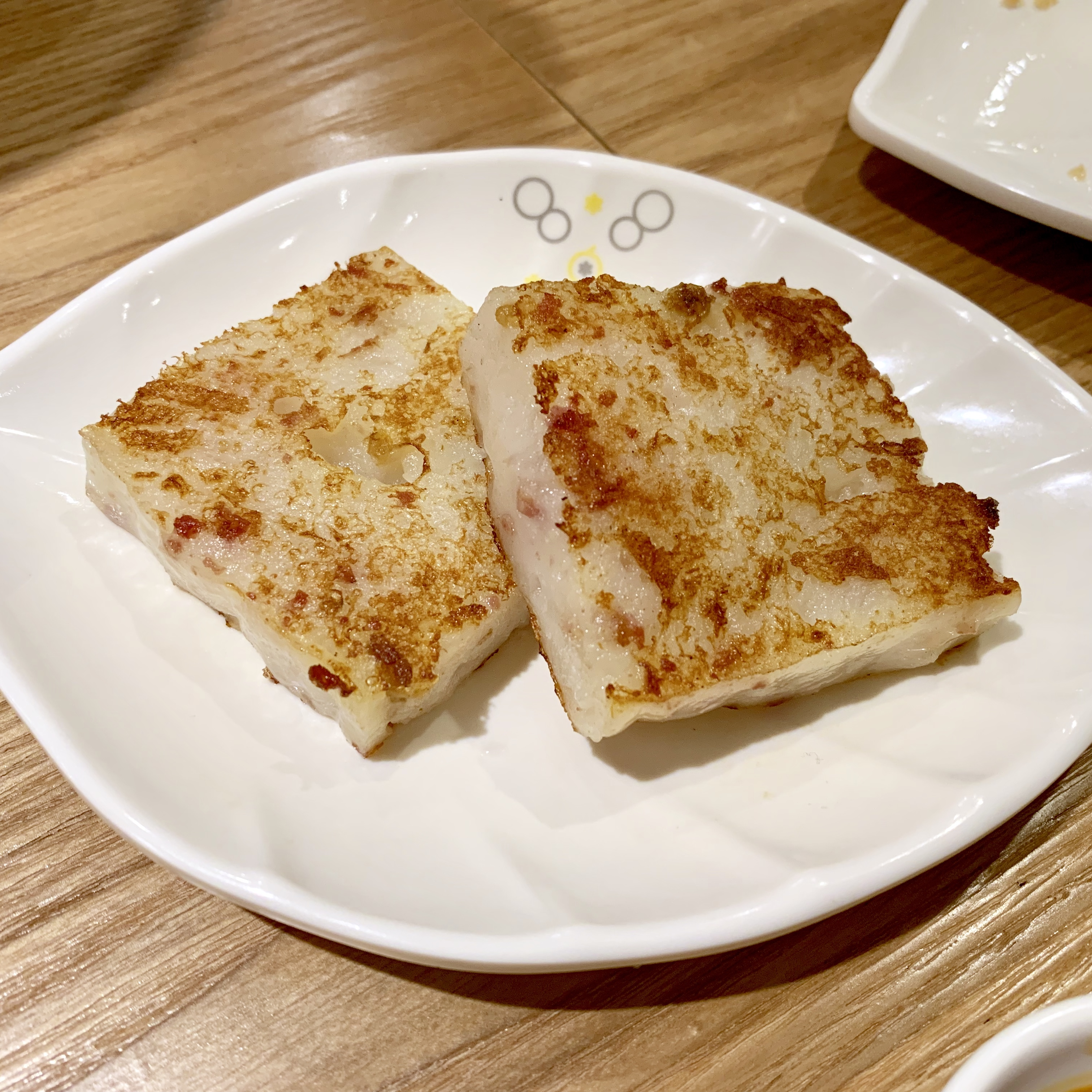
Radish cake at Dim Sum 8 in Taipei, Taiwan

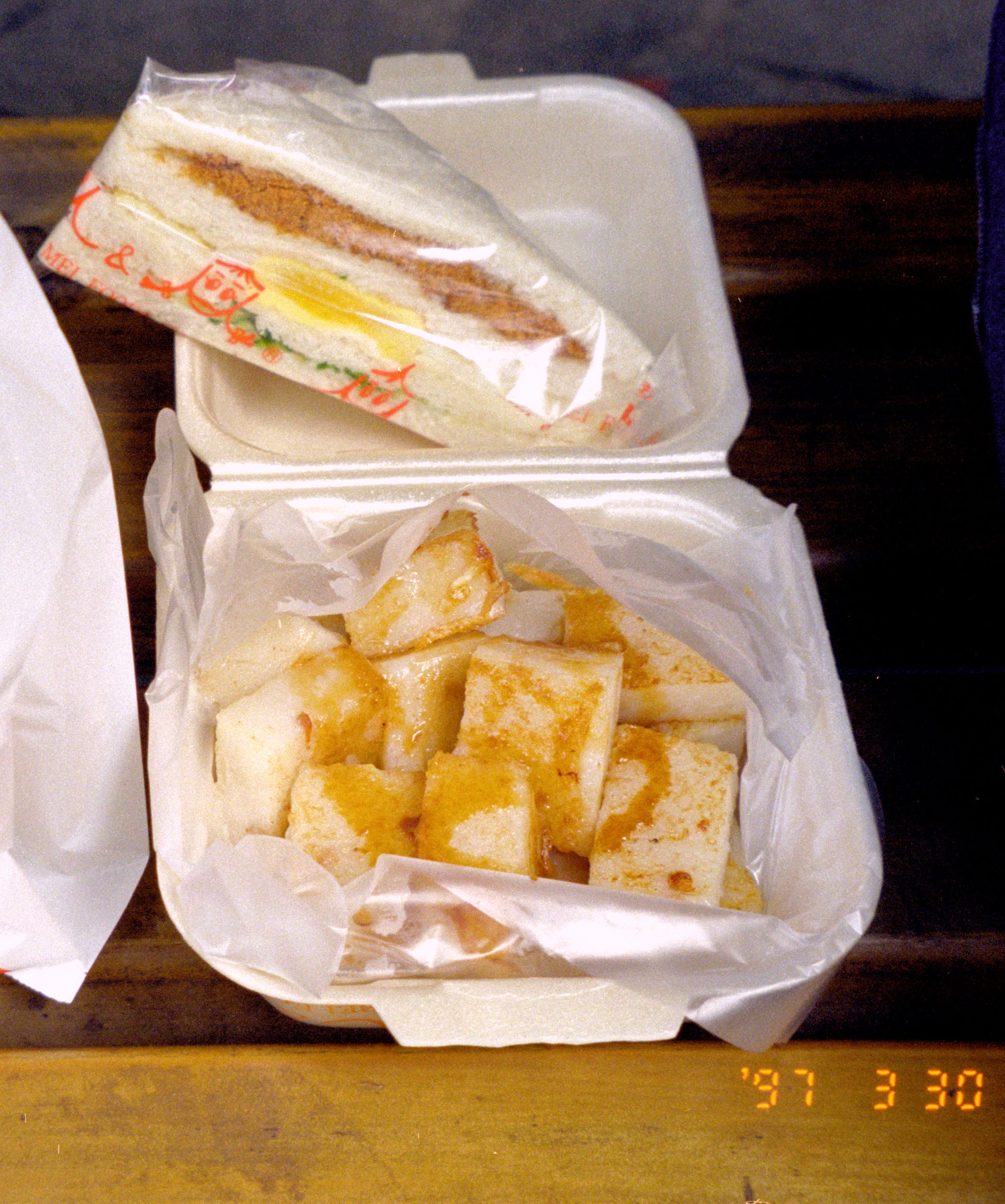
Radish cake as part of a Taiwanese breakfast

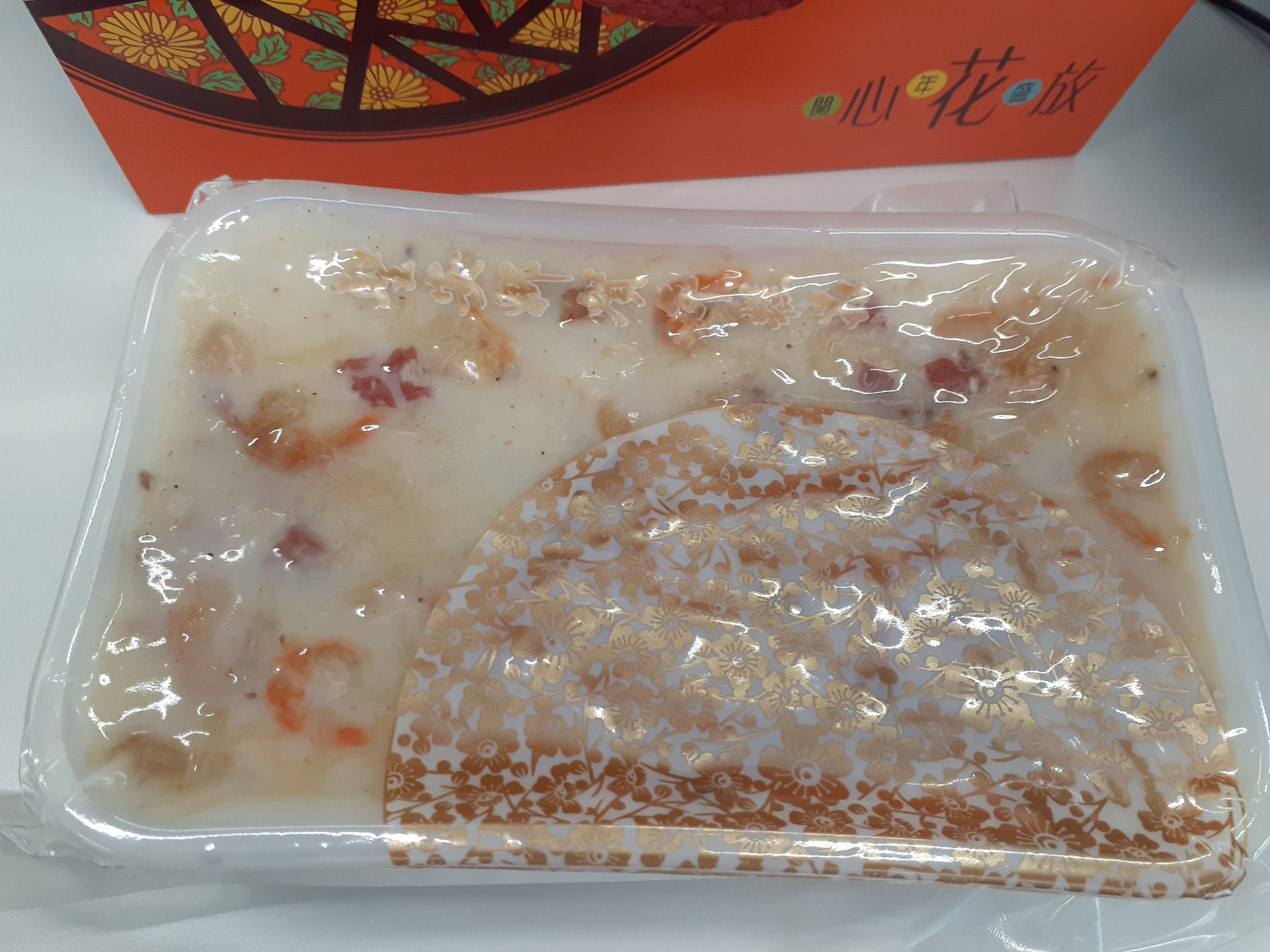
Radish cake in Hong Kong

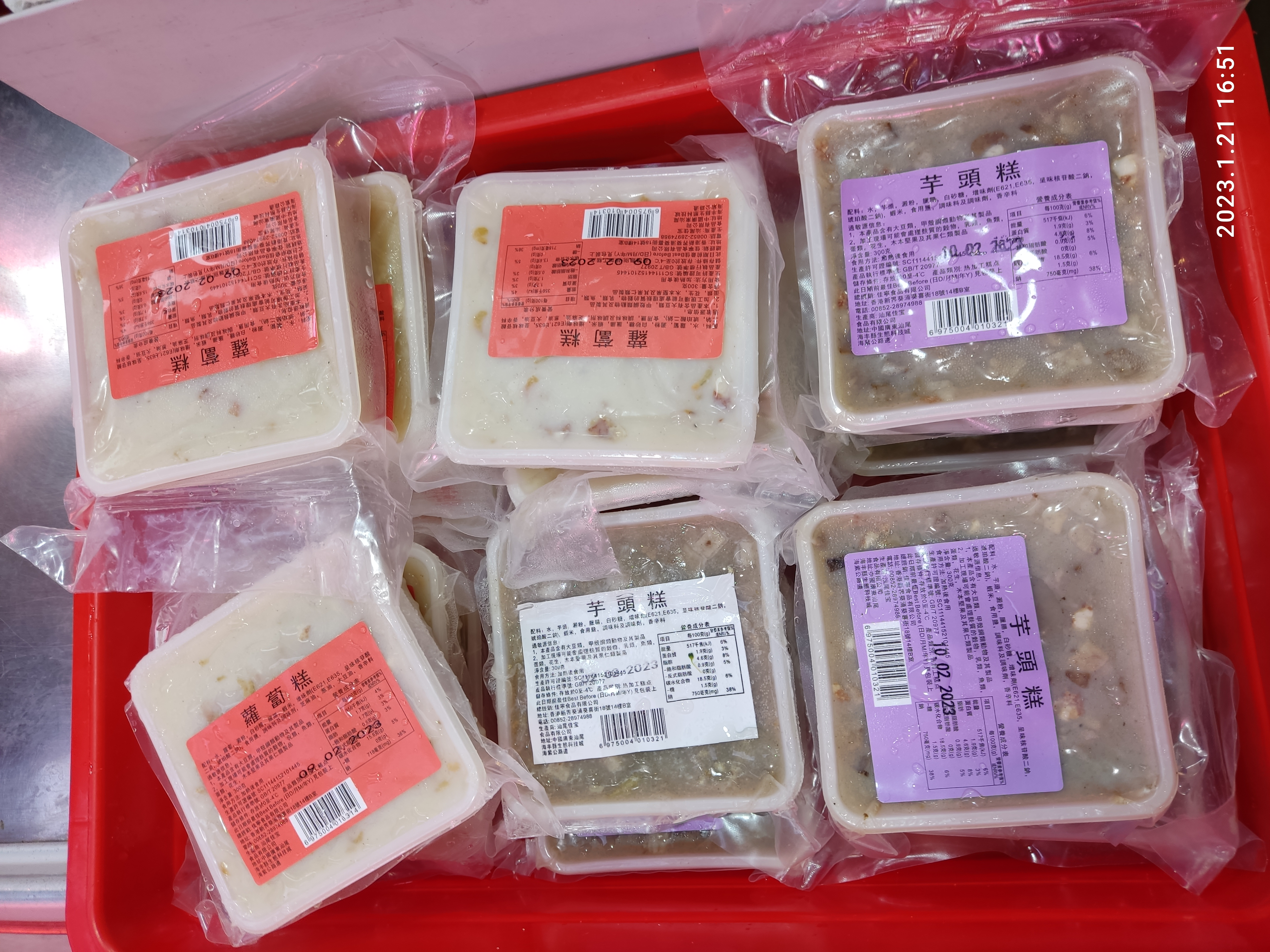
Radish cakes (white) and taro cakes for sale in a Hong Kong supermarket

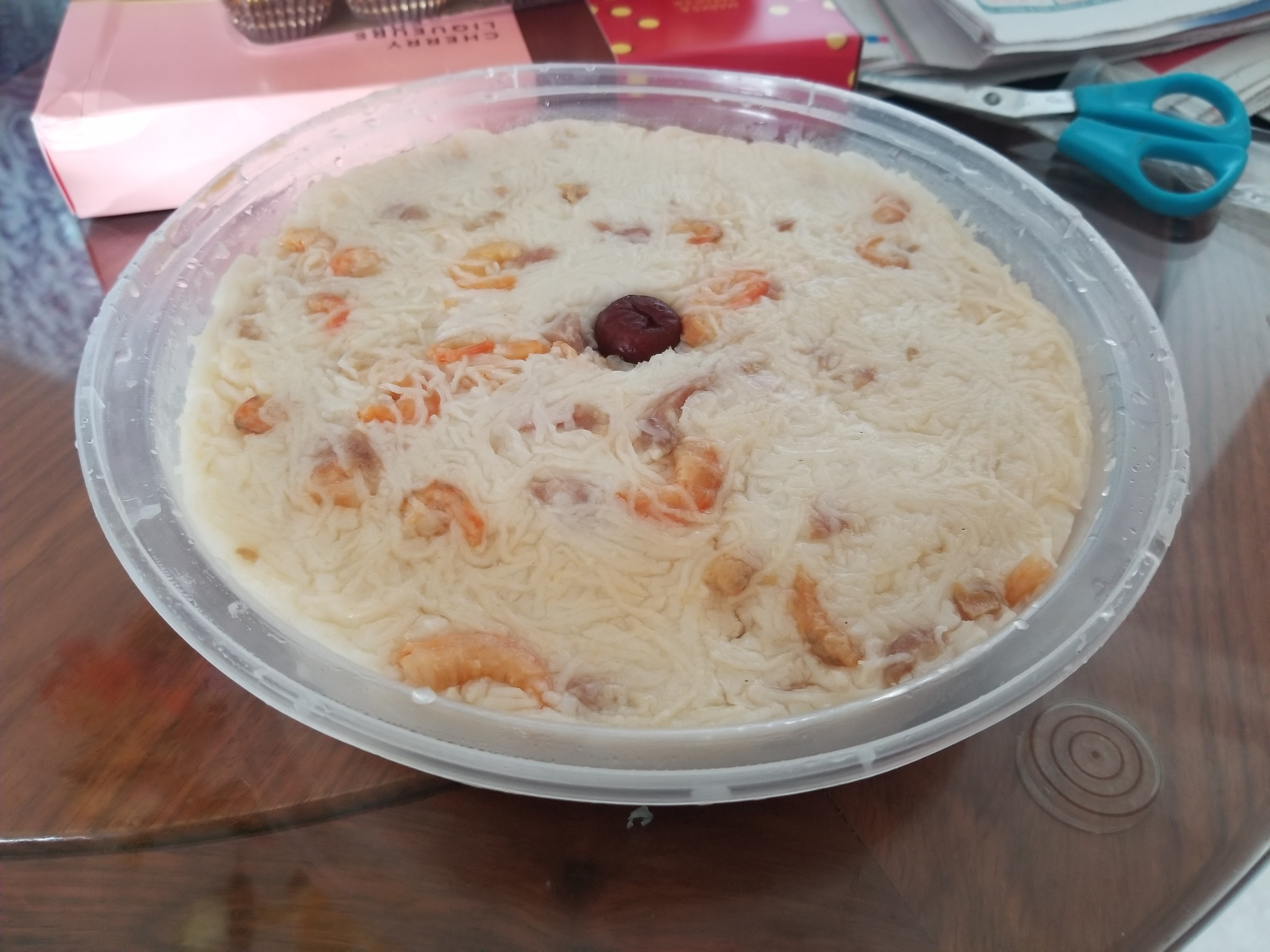
A whole homemade radish cake with shrimp

== See also ==
- Nian gao, a similar Chinese rice cake also eaten at New Years
- Bánh bột chiên, a similar Vietnamese rice cake
- O-tao, a similar Thai taro-based dish
- Water chestnut cake, a dim sum cake of similar appearance
- List of steamed foods
