= Taro dumpling =

Chinese cuisine

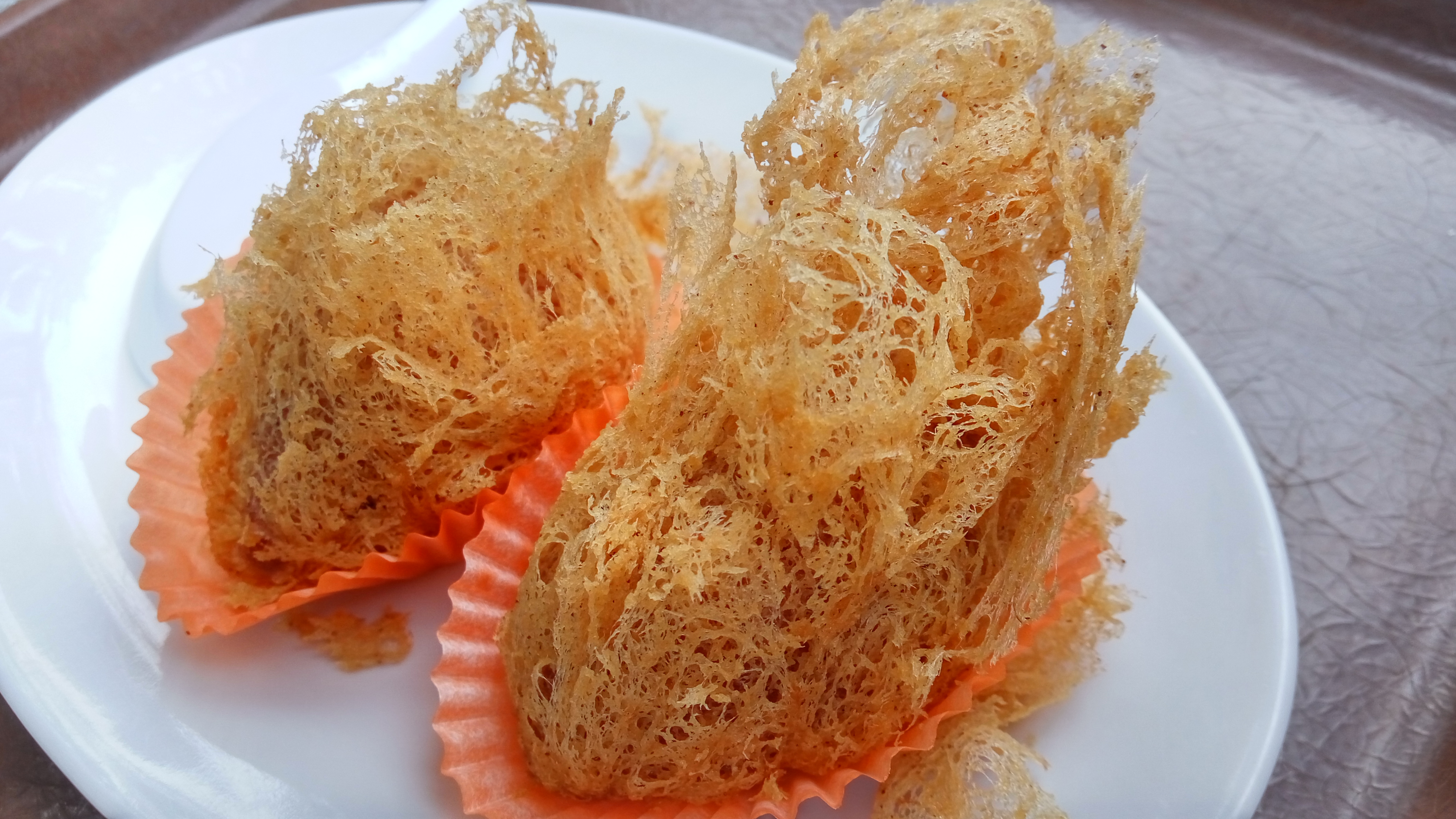
- Taro dumpling
- Type: Dim sum
- Place of origin: China
- Main ingredients: Taro, ground pork

Taro dumpling
- Traditional Chinese: 芋頭角
- Simplified Chinese: 芋头角
- Jyutping: wu6tau2 gok3
- Cantonese Yale: wuhtáu gok
- Hanyu Pinyin: yùtóu jiǎo
- Literal meaning: taro dumpling
Transcriptions
Standard Mandarin
- Hanyu Pinyin: yùtóu jiǎo
Yue: Cantonese
- Yale Romanization: wuhtáu gok
- Jyutping: wu6tau2 gok3

Taro dumpling (Chinese: 芋角; Jyutping: wu6 gok3; Cantonese Yale: wuhgók) is a variety of dim sum served within Chinese cuisine. It is a standard dish in dim sum restaurants in Hong Kong and around the world. Among overseas Chinatowns, it is often sold as a Chinese pastry. It is also known as taro croquette, deep-fried taro dumpling, deep-fried taro dumpling puff, or simply taro dumpling.

The outer shell is made from a thick layer of taro that has been boiled and mashed. The filling is made from seasoned ground pork. The dumpling is deep-fried, and the outermost layer of taro becomes crisp, light, and fluffy.

== See also ==
- Spring roll
- Taro cake
