= Taro cake =

Cantonese dish made from the vegetable taro

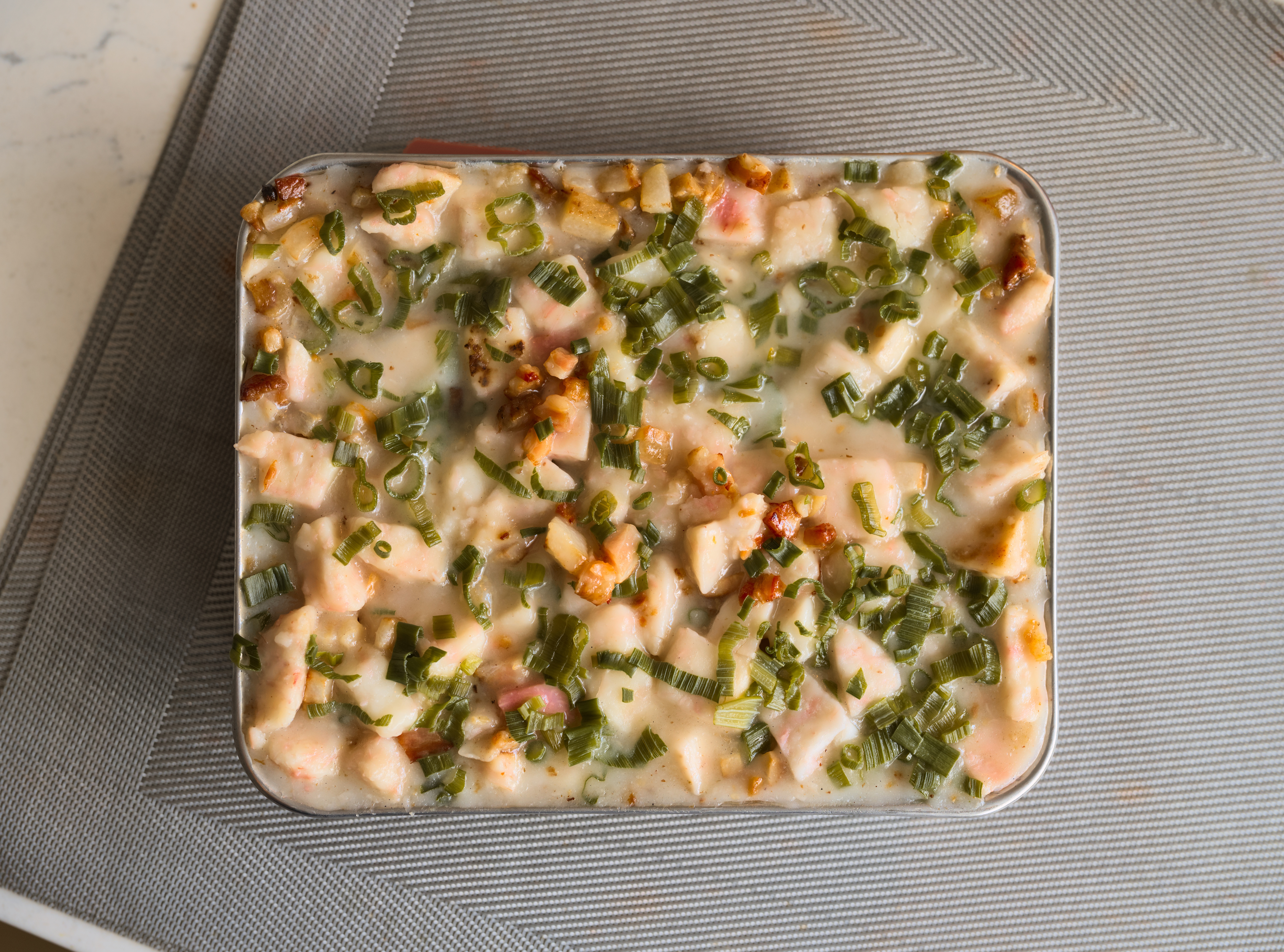
- Taro cake
- Alternative names: Yam cake
- Course: Dim sum
- Place of origin: Southern China
- Region or state: East Asia and Southeast Asia
- Main ingredients: Taro, rice flour
- Variations: Fried and steamed

Taro cake
- Traditional Chinese: 芋頭糕
- Simplified Chinese: 芋头糕
- Literal meaning: taro cake
Transcriptions
Standard Mandarin
- Hanyu Pinyin: yùtóu gāo
- IPA: [ŷtʰǒʊkáʊ]
Yue: Cantonese
- Yale Romanization: wuhtáu gōu
- Jyutping: wu6 tau2 gou1
- IPA: [wu˨tʰɐw˧˥kɔw˥]

Alternative Chinese name
- Chinese: 芋粿
Transcriptions
Southern Min
- Hokkien POJ: ō͘-ké or ō͘-kóe

Taro cake (traditional Chinese: 芋頭糕; simplified Chinese: 芋头糕; pinyin: yùtóu gāo; Cantonese Yale: wuhtáu gōu) is a Cantonese dish made from the vegetable taro. While it is denser in texture than radish cakes, both of these savory cakes are made in similar ways, with rice flour as the main ingredient. As a dim sum, it is usually cut into rectangular slices and pan-fried before serving. It is found in Hong Kong, China, and overseas Chinatown restaurants. Other ingredients often include pork and Chinese black mushroom, or sometimes Chinese sausages. It is usually topped with chopped scallions.

== Variety ==
=== Regional home-style ===
The other version is the more home-style baked version. Usually it uses the same ingredients and steamed for long periods of time in a deep pan until it is ultra soft and pasty. The formula varies greatly depending on the family recipe or regional tastes.

=== Frozen taro cake ===
Some restaurants offer taro cakes cut into small cubes as part of a main course appetizer to a major Chinese cuisine. These are sometimes frozen to a more solid state, though it is not nearly as common as the other forms.

== In other cultures ==
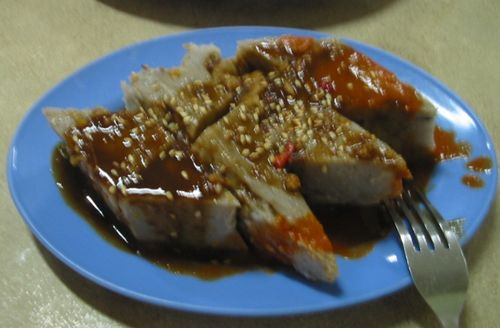
Yam cake

A similar dish is prepared in the cuisine of Vietnam, where it is called bánh khoai môn.

In Malaysia and Singapore, it is known as yam cake.

== See also ==
- Turnip cake
- Water chestnut cake
- Nian gao
- Taro dumpling
