= Chestnut cake =

Cake prepared using chestnuts

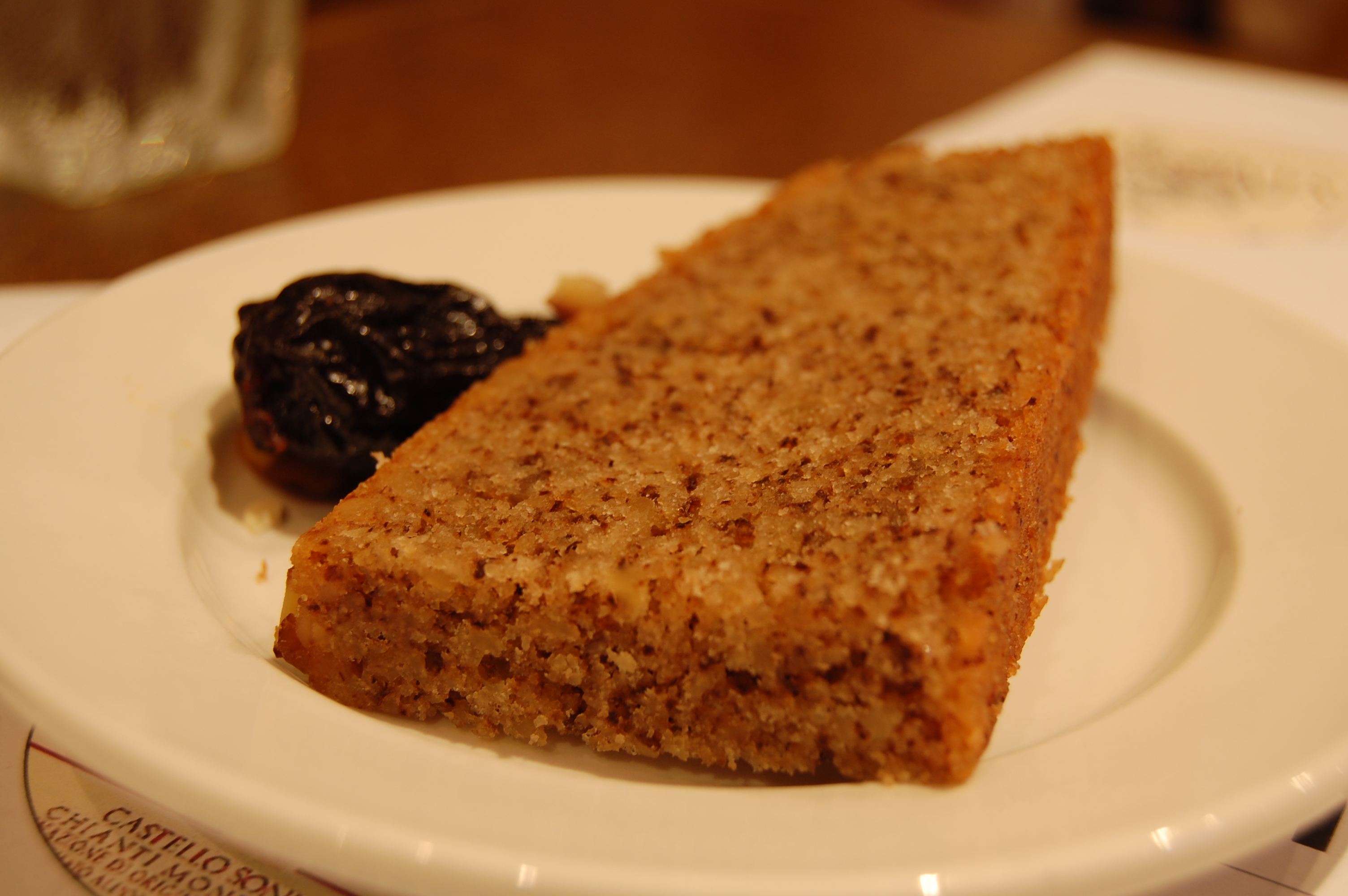
A slice of chestnut cake

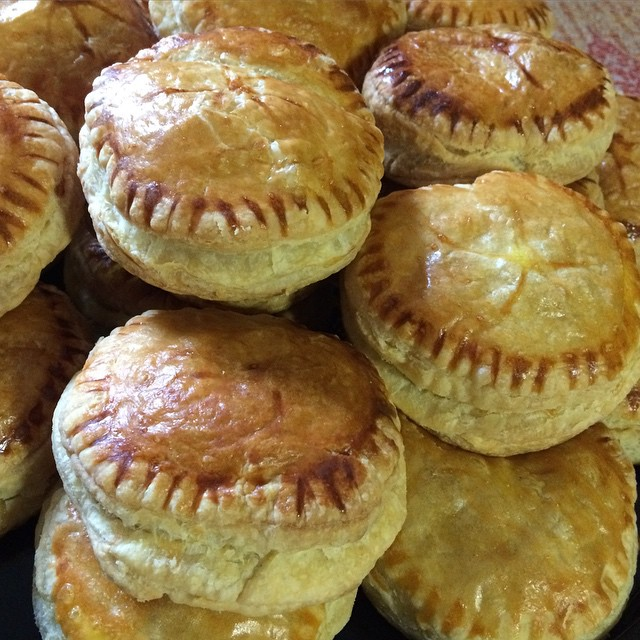
Chestnut cakes filled with chestnuts and red bean paste

Chestnut cake is a cake prepared using chestnuts. Chestnut flour prepared from cooked, ground chestnuts is used in its preparation, along with additional typical cake ingredients. It is sometimes prepared as a chocolate cake. Chestnuts are sometimes used in a frosting or glaze atop the cake, and it may be garnished with cooked or candied chestnuts. It can be prepared as a gluten-free dish.

== Overview ==
Chestnut cake is prepared using chestnuts as the main ingredient. Chestnuts are ground into a flour for its preparation. Higher quality chestnut flours for use in cake preparation may be white, rather than darker in coloration, the latter of which could be due to the chestnuts being incompletely peeled prior to grinding. Chestnut cake can be prepared using wheat flour, with chestnut pieces used inside of the cake. Additional ingredients may include typical cake ingredients such as flour, sugar, eggs and leavening. Chestnut cake may be prepared as a chocolate cake, and also as a layer cake. It has a distinct chestnut flavor.

It is served as a dessert cake, and some versions are topped with icing, ganache or whipped cream. Chestnuts may be included in the icing or frosting, such as in a chocolate-chestnut frosting. Candied or cooked chestnuts may be added atop the cake as a garnish. Distilled beverages such as brandy and Scotch whisky may be used as an ingredient in the frosting or icing. It may be prepared as a gluten-free dish using chestnut flour and rice flour.

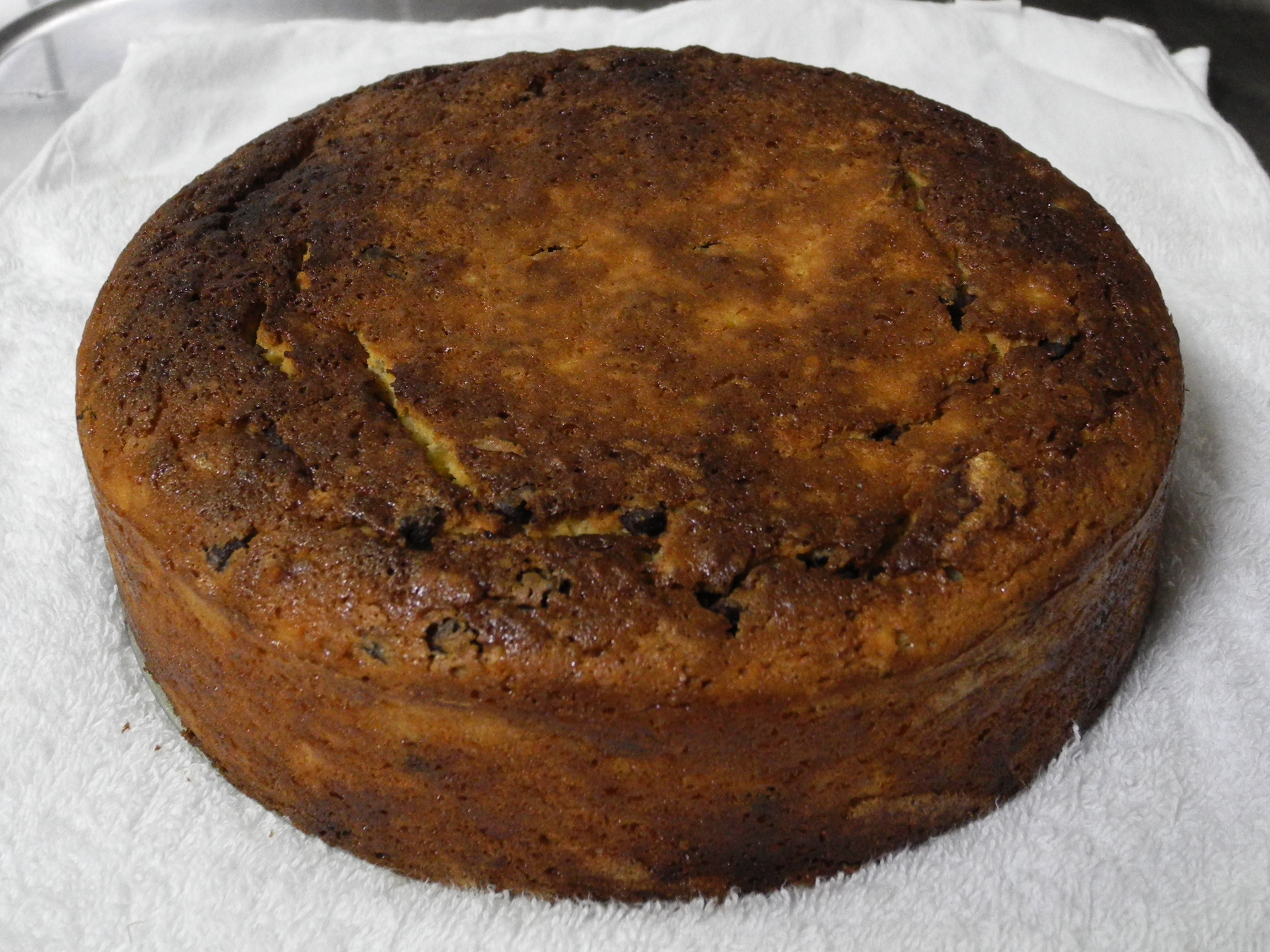
A well-done chestnut cake

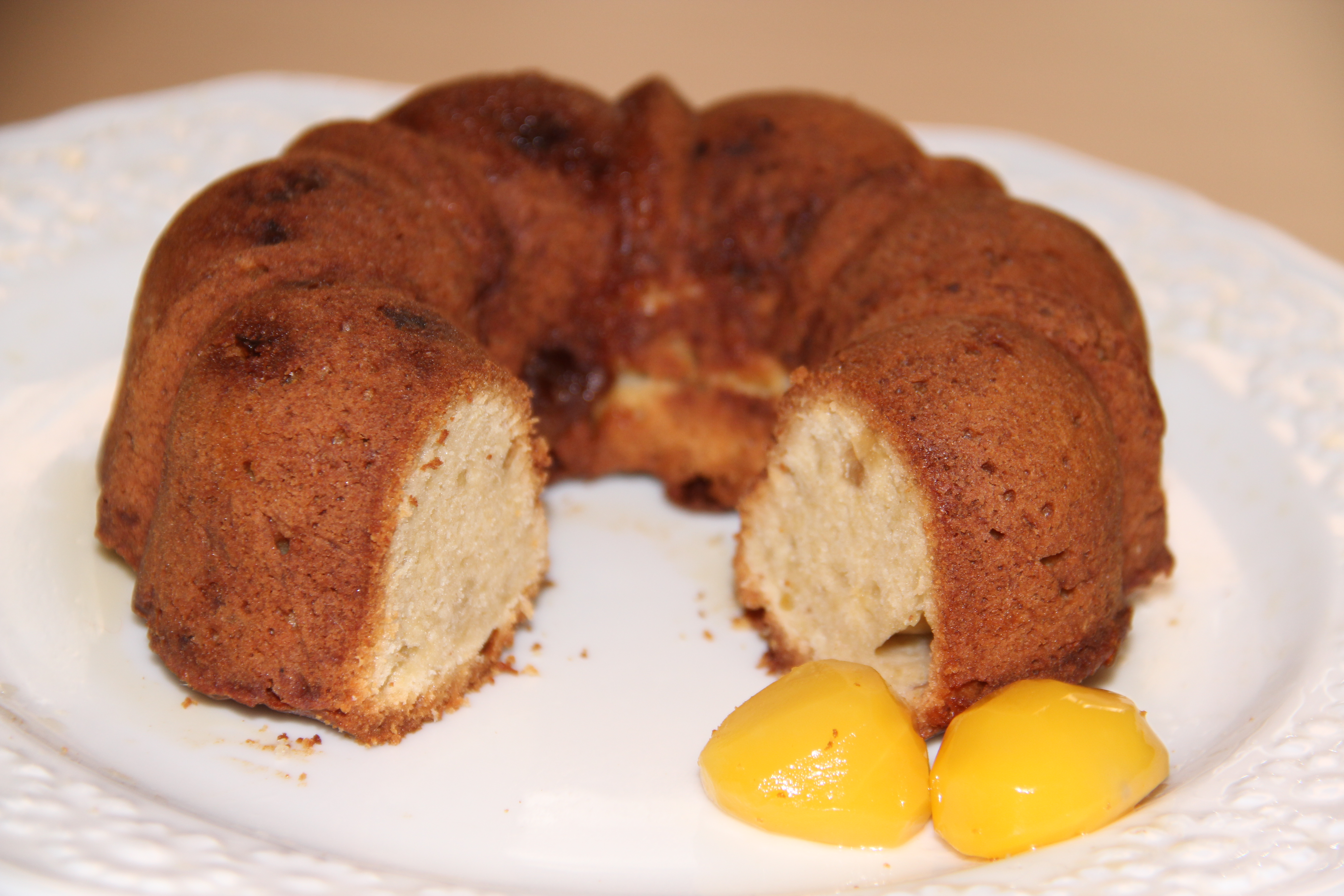
A gugelhupf cake with chestnuts

== See also ==
- Brazil nut cake
- Chestnut pie
- List of cakes
- Water chestnut cake
