= O-tao =

O-tao (Thai: โอวต้าว IPA: [ʔoː tâːw] or โอวต้าว [ʔoː wá tâːw]) is an oyster omelet dish of Hokkien origin in the local cuisine of Phuket Province, Thailand. The Thai name comes from the Hokkien Chinese ô-tau (蚵兜) or ô-á-tau (蚵仔兜), a similar dish from Fujian, China. It is made of flour and taro, with small oysters (hoitip [หอยติบ]), shrimp, bits of pork cracklings and spring onions added. It is eaten with a sweet and spicy sauce and is served with a side dish of bean sprout.
