= Brazil nut cake =

Popular South American confection

Brazil nut cake (Portuguese: Bolo de castanha-do-pará) is a cake prepared using Brazil nuts as a primary ingredient. Coffeecake, shortcake, pound cake, fruitcake, brownies and torte cake may be prepared using Brazil nuts as a main ingredient. Ground or chopped Brazil nuts may be used. Brazil nut cake is a dish in Brazilian cuisine, and it is a common and popular cake in the Amazon region of Bolivia, Brazil and Peru.

== Overview ==
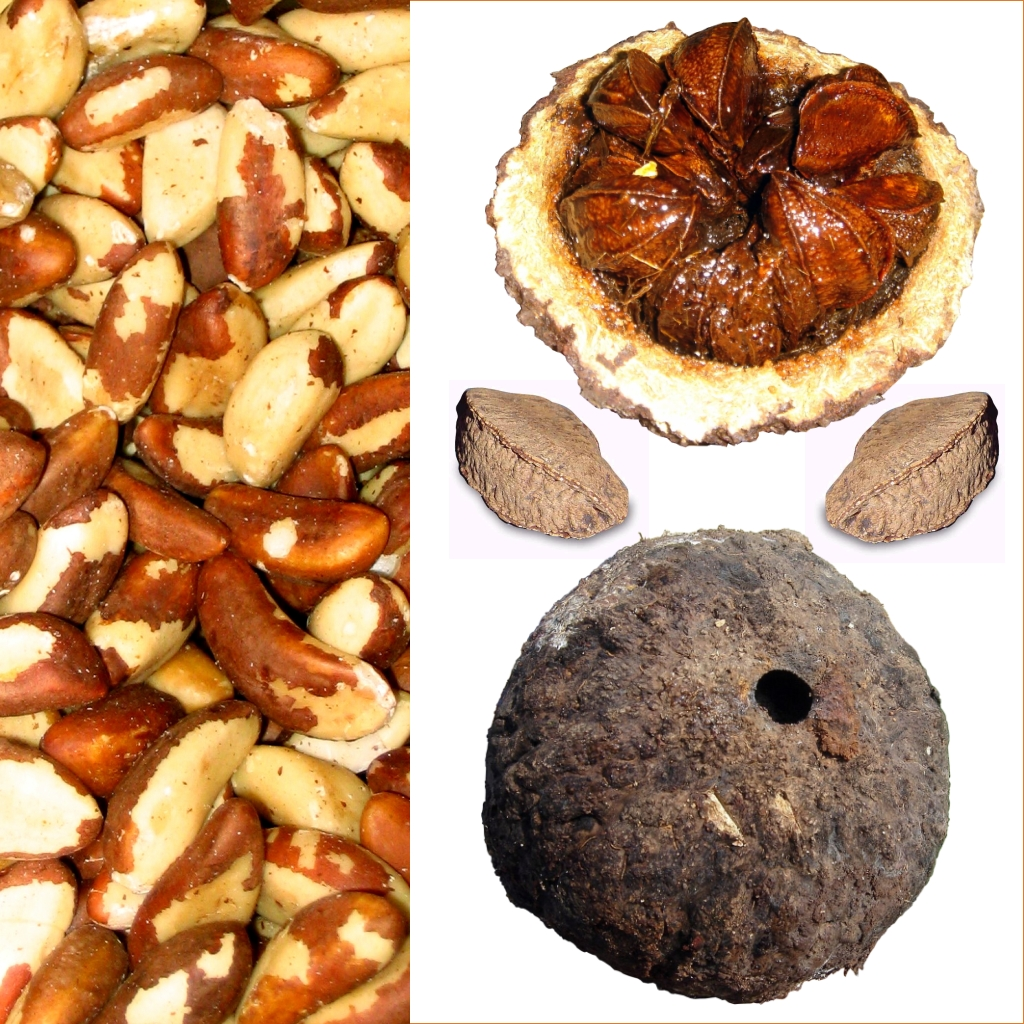
An image of Brazil nuts, the primary ingredient of the cake.

Brazil nut cake is prepared using Brazil nuts as a main ingredient. Other typical cake ingredients may be used, such as flour, sugar, butter, eggs, milk and baking powder. The Brazil nuts may be sliced, chopped, ground or granulated, the latter preparation may be performed using a food processor. Some desserts are prepared without the use of flour, whereby the use of ground Brazil nuts may take the place of flour. It may be prepared with the addition of fruit, such as dates. Shortcake, coffee cake, pound cake, fruitcake and brownies may be prepared using Brazil nuts as a primary ingredient. Brazil nut cake is a part of Brazilian cuisine, as are other dishes prepared with Brazil nuts. In Brazil, sweet dishes prepared using Brazil nuts are more common in the northern part of the country compared to other areas.

== Amazon region ==
Orange-flavored Brazil nut cake is common and popular in the Amazon region of Bolivia, Brazil and Peru, where it is generally consumed plain or topped with an orange or chocolate glaze. In the Amazon region, the cake may be prepared using orange juice in the batter. The cake is sometimes topped with whole or chopped Brazil nuts. Some versions of the cake in this region include cocoa powder in the batter.

== Brazil nut torte ==
Brazil nut cake may be prepared as a torte cake. The Brazil nut torte may be prepared using condensed milk as an ingredient in the batter, and it may be topped with Brazil nuts and with the nuts placed on the sides of them after cooking. Bittersweet chocolate may be used as an ingredient in the Brazil nut torte.

== Toxicity ==
Brazil nuts are poisonous in quantity. See toxicity.

== See also ==
- Chestnut cake
- List of cakes
