= Nian gao =

Chinese food

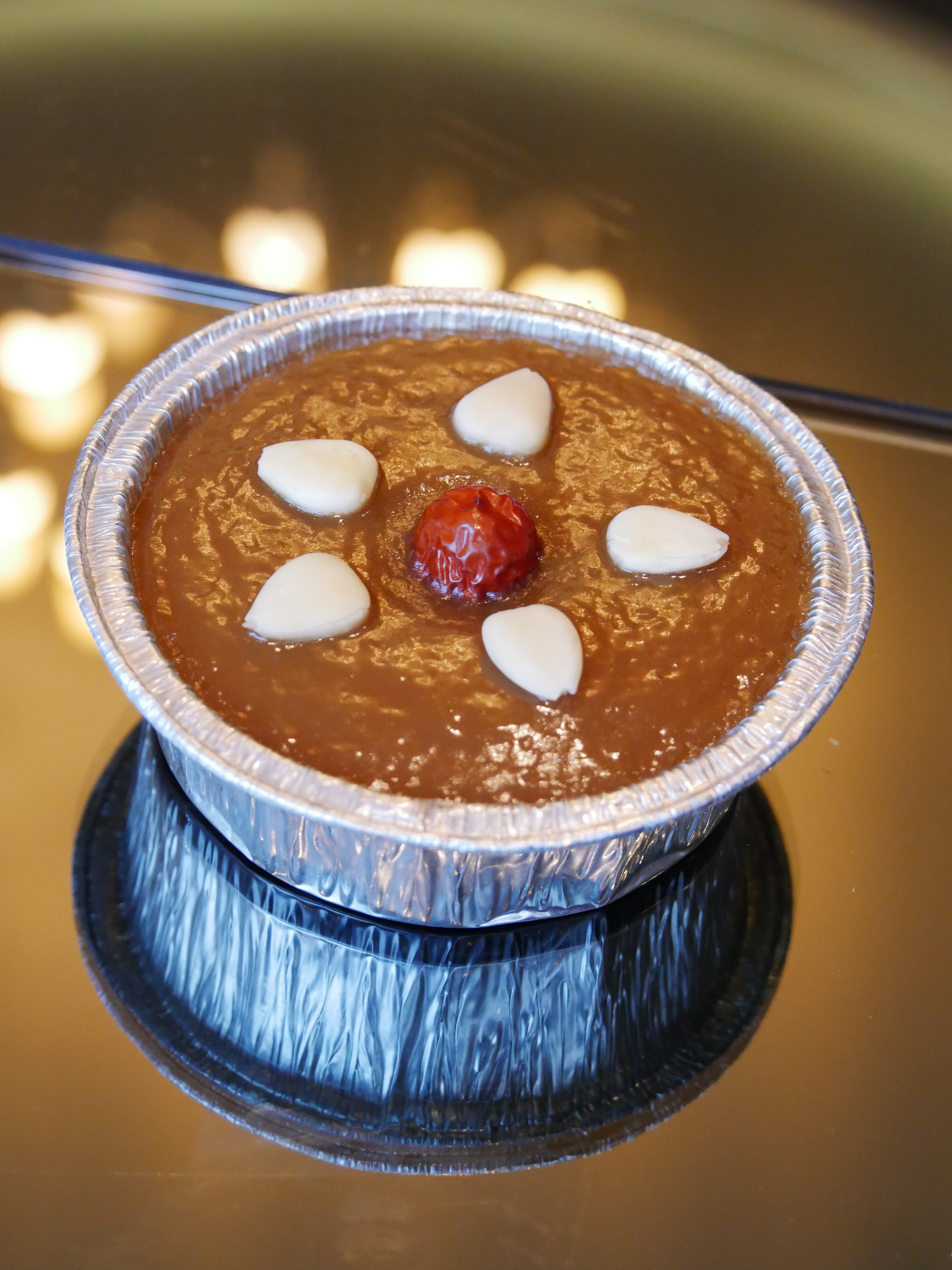
- Cantonese-style nian gao
- Alternative names: Year cake, Chinese New Year's cake, tikoy, ti kuih
- Place of origin: China
- Region or state: East Asia (Mainland China, Hong Kong, Macau, and Taiwan); Southeast Asia (Singapore, Malaysia, Cambodia, Indonesia, Myanmar, Philippines, Thailand, and Vietnam); South Asia (Sri Lanka)
- Variations: Varies by region (Cantonese, Shanghai, Fujian, etc.)
- Other information: Typically consumed during Chinese New Year

Nian gao
- Chinese: 年糕
- Literal meaning: year cake
Transcriptions
Standard Mandarin
- Hanyu Pinyin: nián gāo
Wu
- Romanization: [ɲi kɔ]
Yue: Cantonese
- Yale Romanization: nìhn gōu
- Jyutping: nin⁴ gou¹

Alternative Chinese name
- Chinese: 甜粿
- Literal meaning: sweet kuih
Transcriptions
Standard Mandarin
- Hanyu Pinyin: tián guǒ
Southern Min
- Hokkien POJ: tiⁿ-kóe or tiⁿ-ké

Nian gao (Chinese: 年糕; pinyin: niángāo; Cantonese Yale: nìhngōu), sometimes translated as year cake or New Year cake or Chinese New Year's cake, is a food prepared from glutinous rice flour and consumed in Chinese cuisine. It is also simply known as "rice cake". While it can be eaten all year round, traditionally it is most popular during the Chinese New Year. It is considered good luck to eat nian gao during this time of the year because nian gao (年糕) is a homonym for "higher year" or "grow every year" (年高), which means "a more prosperous year". The character 年 is literally translated as "year", and the character 糕 (gāo) is literally translated as "cake" and is identical in sound to the character 高, meaning "tall" or "high". In Mandarin (though not all Chinese languages), Nian gao (年糕) also is an exact homonym of "sticky cake" (黏糕／粘糕), the character 黏／粘 (nián) meaning "sticky".

This sticky sweet snack was believed to be an offering to the Kitchen God, with the aim that his mouth will be stuck with the sticky cake, so that he cannot badmouth the human family in front of the Jade Emperor. It is also traditionally eaten during Chinese New Year.

Originally from China, it spread to or gave rise to related rice cakes in Southeast Asian countries and Sri Lanka due to overseas Chinese influences.

== History ==
Making of nian gao can be traced back to the Northern and Southern dynasties (386–589 AD). The agricultural text Qimin Yaoshu, written during that time, referenced an older recipe book Shi Ci (食次) and the glutinous rice dish, ye (䊦): "Use glutinous rice flour, sieve with silk cloth, add water and honey, use hand to knead the dough, making two-inch squares, cut to four sticks, put date and chestnut meat on and under the sticks, grease around, cover with bamboo leaves, steam thoroughly, set aside two hours, if the leaves are still on, ripped off, set the sticks free." Ye was the earliest variant of nian gao known to have been made.

== Significance and rituals ==
Nian gao sounds identical to 年高, meaning "higher year," implying promotions or prosperity year after year. This association makes nian gao a popular gift item during the New Year period. The traditional nian gao is round with an auspicious decoration such as the character for prosperity (福) on its top. The character is often written in the traditional Chinese script.

As a gift item, nian gao are fashioned into different shapes with attractive packaging to suit the festive season. Popular designs include a pair of carps (年年有餘) symbolizing surplus every year, ingots (元寶), or the God of Wealth (財神). These designs are auspicious symbols and send good wishes for the New Year.

== Production ==
Despite numerous varieties, they all share the same glutinous rice ingredient that is pounded or ground into a paste and, depending on the variety, may simply be molded into shape or cooked again to settle the ingredient. Nian gao has many varieties, including the types found in Cantonese cuisine, Fujian cuisine, Shanghai cuisine, and northern Chinese cuisine.

== Types ==
=== Guangdong/Cantonese cuisine ===
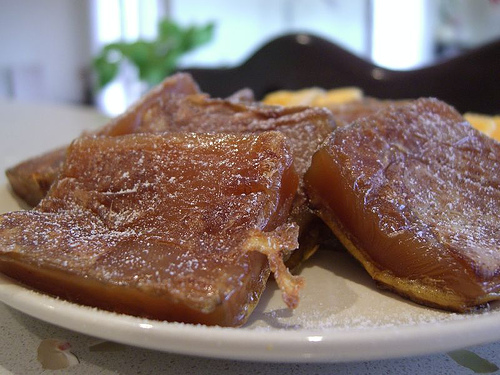
Guangdong sweet nian gao, dipped in egg and pan-fried

The Guangdong variety is sweetened, usually with Chinese brown sugar. It is distinct with a dark yellow color. The paste is poured into a cake pan and steamed once more to settle the mixture. The batter is steamed until it solidifies and served in thick slices. It may be eaten as is. The nian gao becomes stretchy and extremely sticky. It can also be served as a pudding flavored with rosewater or red bean paste.

The next stage is optional, as it can be sliced and be pan-fried afterwards, often with egg, to make fried nian gao (Chinese: 煎年糕; pinyin: jiān nián gāo; Jyutping: zin^{1} nin^{4} gou^{1}). When fried, it is slightly crispy on the outside, and remains pasty on the inside. During the Chinese New Year, it is cut into square pieces and served along with similar cake dim sum dishes, like water chestnut cakes and taro cakes. People also send pieces of nian gao to their friends and relatives as wishes for prosperity and good fortune.

=== Fujian/Hokkien cuisine ===
In the Southern region of Fujian, nian gao, natural amber, is mainly used for the New Year ritual and gifts. It is made of glutinous rice and taro, which are then usually sliced and cooked before eating. It can also be wrapped in egg or cornstarch (corn flour) or sweet potato to fry.

=== Jiangnan and Shanghainese cuisine ===
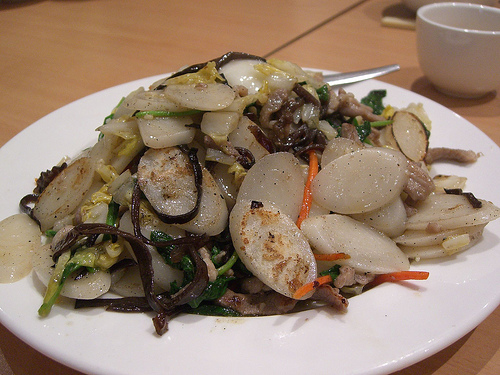
Shanghai savoury fried nian gao

Nian gao is white along the lower reaches of the Yangtze River (the Jiangnan region), and it is a mild food. It is made by mixing rice with glutinous rice; the ratio between the two can be adjusted according to personal preferences. The softer version has an increased proportion of glutinous rice. Cooking methods include steaming, frying, sliced frying, or in soup. Ningbo nian gao is the most famous, and common practices include pickled pork soup nian gao and shepherd's purse fried nian gao. Shanghai's ribs nian gao are also distinctive. The Shanghai Niangao style is usually packaged in a thick, soft rod to be sliced up or packaged sliced and either stir-fried or added to soup. Depending on the cooking method, this style is a soft to a chewy variant. The Shanghai style keeps the nian gao white, and is made with nonglutinous rice. The color is its distinct feature. When served as a dish, the most common is the stir-fry method, hence the name (炒年糕, chǎo nián gāo). Three general types exist. The first is a savory dish; common ingredients include scallions, beef, pork, cabbage, Chinese cabbage, etc. The second is a sweet version using standard white sugar. The last version is almost tasteless, and is often consumed for its chewy textures.

=== Northern cuisine ===
Northern nian gao can be steamed or fried, and is mainly sweet in taste. The Beijing versions include jujube and either glutinous rice or yellow rice, mince nian gao, and white nian gao. The Shanxi makes nian gao using fried yellow rice and red bean paste or jujube paste for filling. Hebei uses jujube, small red beans, and green beans to make steamed nian gao. In Shandong, it is made of red dates and yellow rice. The Northeast type is made of beans on sticky sorghum.

== Similar food in Asia ==
=== Burmese cuisine ===
It is commonly called tikay (တီကေ့) in Burma, from Hokkien tike (甜粿). Introduced by the Sino-Burmese, it is commonly eaten during the Lunar New Year.

=== Cambodian cuisine ===
Buddha cake, or nom preahpout (នំព្រះពុទ្ធ), is a Cambodian counterpart consumed during Khmer New Year.

=== Indonesian cuisine ===
In Indonesia, it is known as kue keranjang or dodol Tionghoa or dodol Cina, the latter both meaning "Chinese dodol", a similar Indonesian rice flour confection.

Kue keranjang was originally named as nien kao or ni-kwee or yearly cake or seasonal cake, because they are only made once a year. In East Java, this cake was named kue keranjang because the wrapper is made from a bamboo basket with a little hole in the middle. In West Java, it was named China cake, as the origin of the cake from China, but some call it China Cake because the producers are Chinese (known as Tionghoa).

=== Japanese cuisine ===
In Japan, mochi is a similar glutinous rice cake eaten primarily for the Japanese New Year.

=== Korean cuisine ===
In Korea, tteokguk, a soup dish that uses the garae-tteok similar to the Shanghai variety of nián gāo, is traditionally eaten during the Korean New Year.

=== Peranakan cuisine ===
Peranakan Chinese offer steamed sticky cakes called kueh bakul (粘糕; nian gao) to the Kitchen God, Zao Jun (also known as Zao Shen and Zao Wang) as offerings.

=== Philippine cuisine ===
In the Philippines, the food is called tikoy, originating from the Hokkien word 甜粿. It is popular during the Lunar or Chinese New Year and was culturally assimilated within the population's own cooking techniques through trade networks between the Philippines and Hokkien-speaking regions such as Fujian and Taiwan. It is sweetened with brown sugar, giving it a dark yellow to light brown colour, but it is also often prepared with different flavours, such as ube (purple yam), giving it a purple colour, or pandan, giving it a green colour. Tikoy may be eaten as is, but can also be dipped in beaten egg and lightly pan fried until crispy, but still chewy inside. Also a version of tikoy is made in southern Quezon province. Unlike others, this variant is sweet and is similar to Japanese mochi. Tikoy can also be consumed as an ingredient in the Filipino dessert called turon or be eaten with ice cream and chocolate or covered with grated coconut flesh and peanuts.

=== Sri Lankan cuisine ===
In Sri Lanka, seenakku (Sinhala: සීනක්කු) is of Malay origin and derives from the influences of the Peranakan Chinese who settled on the island during Dutch rule. Seenakku is a popular sweet among the country's Sinhalese and Sri Lankan Malay communities and is served with grated coconut. Seenakku is called cheena kueh by the Sri Lankan Malay community, with its name reflecting its Chinese origin.

=== Vietnamese cuisine ===
Bánh tổ is a Vietnamese counterpart to the Chinese nian gao. It is a speciality of Đà Nẵng (areas encompassing what was formerly Quảng Nam province) and also consumed by the ethnic Chinese community in the area.

== Influence outside Asia ==
=== Mauritian cuisine ===
In Mauritius, nian gao is commonly called gâteau la cire (literally translated as 'wax cake'); however, it can be written numerous ways, including gato la cire, gato lasir, or gato lacire. It is a traditional food in the Sino-Mauritian community. Traditionally, it is made with rice flour, sweetened with sugar (sometimes honey), and uses orange zest as the key ingredient. The classic colour of nian gao in Mauritius has traditionally been brown; however, new colours and flavours, such as white (which is coconut-milk based), green (which is pandan-based), red, and yellow, have been introduced in 2018.

In Mauritius, nian gao is a cake which symbolizes sharing, so it is customary for Sino-Mauritians to share and distribute nian gao to celebrate Chinese New Year to their families and friends. Nian gao is consumed by locals regardless of their ethnicity. Some nian gao found on the island is imported while others are made by the local ethnic Chinese community. The traditional way of making nian gao is still transmitted from generation to generation in some families.

=== American cuisine ===
Chinese Americans eat cooked or fried nian gao on Chinese New Year's Eve and on New Year's Eve. In Hawai'i, nian gao is known as gau and is a popular food consumed during the Chinese New Year.

== See also ==
- List of steamed foods
- Rice cake
- Mooncake
- Bánh
- Garae-tteok
