= Korean baked goods =

Baked food from Korea

- Place of origin: South Korea
- Region or state: East Asia
- Associated cuisine: South Korea

Korean baked goods consists of either snacks (Korean: 한국 생과자) or bread (한국 빵). Examples include bread, buns, pastries, cakes, and snacks.

Most bread is not traditional to Korean cuisine, other than some types of traditional steamed bread that were made of mixed rice flour and wheat. Korean breads were first introduced to the mainstream market in the 1980s with the establishment of the bakery chain Paris Baguette. The items that were introduced to the Korean market aimed to introduce a French-inspired type of bread that would simultaneously satisfy a Korean taste palette. Hence, the type of bread and buns that were created were a fusion of Western technique and Korean flavours. Western fused breads are a growing phenomenon across Asia and as new Asian bakery chains grew in their home countries, they have simultaneously entered international markets.

== Characteristics ==
Korean style buns are soft, springy and sweet. Other than some softer bread varieties like the croissant or brioche, Korean breads differ greatly from most traditional European breads, which characteristically have a harder crust and a dry, salty crumb. In Western-style baking, bread has zero fat and the main components are flour, salt, and water. Korean style bread, on the other hand, are high in fat and sugar, which together give the bread its unique soft texture.

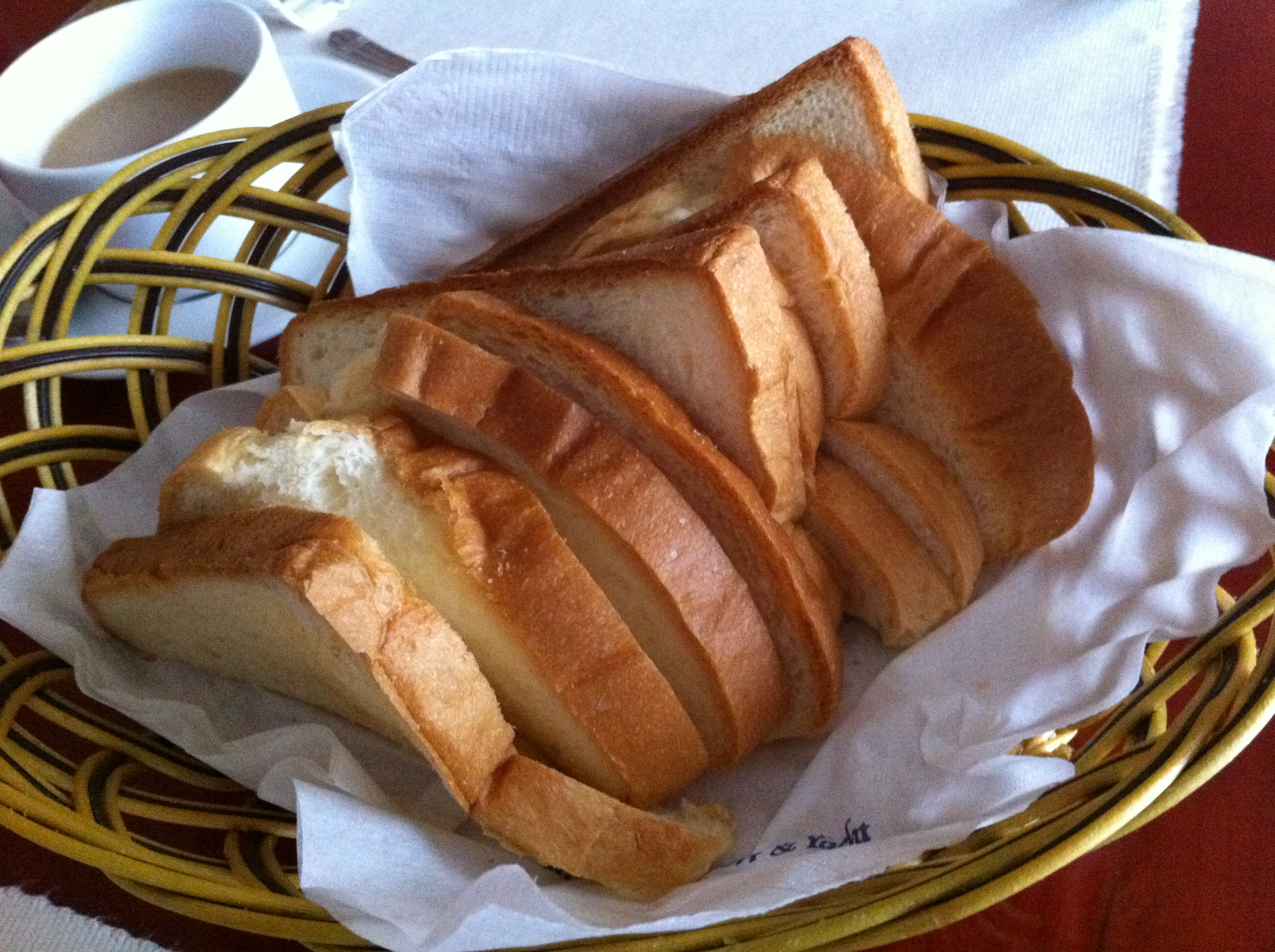
Typical white bread found in South Korean bakeries

Korean baked breads are very soft and typically drizzled with condensed milk. Commonly baked goods take the form of a stuffed bun with the most typical filling being red-bean. Many resemble items found in a French bakery, however most feature Korean flavours fused with Western baking techniques.

Mi Young Lee, the East Coast Manager of the South Korea based bakery chain, Tous Les Jours, notes bread sold in Korean bakeries resembled items found in a French bakery but feature Asian flavours, "the result is a fascinating array of pastries, both sweet and savoury, that appeal to both Eastern and Western palettes."

Chains like Paris Baguette and Tous Les Jours are at the forefront of developing new flavours and variations in Korean bread and have been introducing items that harness traditional Korean flavours like red bean, green matcha and sesame.

== Varieties ==
A Korean bakery typically offers over 300 different items. Many are sweet, much like a brioche, and rarely do Korean bakeries offer dense, multigrain loaves commonly found in European or Western bakeries.

The most common and popular items include gyeran-ppang (egg bread) and Soboro-ppang (a type of streusel). 'Egg bread' is a sweet and savoury oblong muffin with a whole egg baked on top.

Bungeoppang are fish-shaped waffles, filled with sweet red bean paste. Similar to the bungeo-ppang is 'gukhwappang', which are the same make but are in the shape of chrysanthemum-flowers. "Bungeo-ppang" (붕어빵; "carp bread") and "gyeran-ppang" ("계란빵", egg bread) are staple items at street food markets in South Korea.

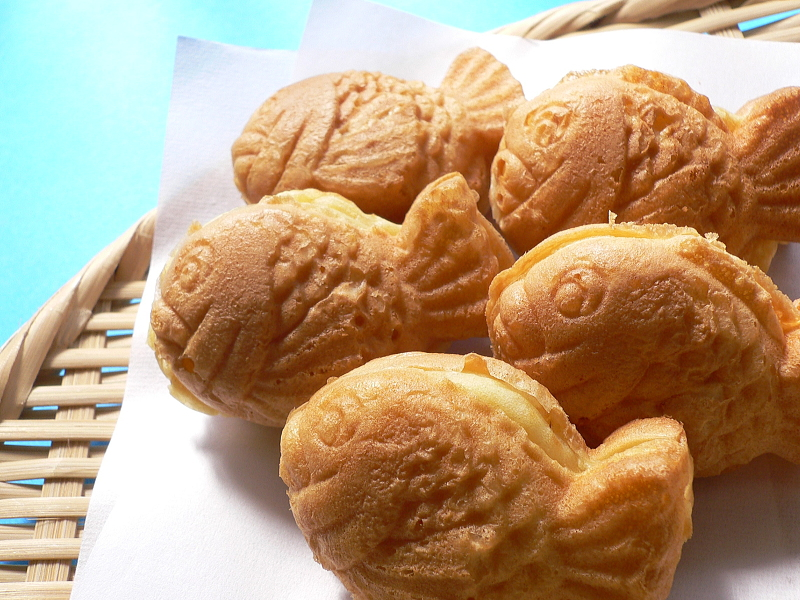
Bungeo-ppang (붕어빵; "carp bread")

Soboro, or Korean streusel bread, is a kind of bread cookie that is topped on a pastry bread giving it a hard, crusty top. Soboro streusel varieties can also be found filled with sweet potato, red bean or strawberry jam.

There are many cream cheese-filled breads including mocha cream cheese bread, walnut cream cheese bread, almond cream cheese bread, cream cheese rye bread and red bean cream cheese bread. There are also custard-filled varieties including condensed milk bread, custard-filled bread and melon cream bread.

Varieties of bread with traditional Korean dessert ingredients include walnut red bean bread, glutinous rice bread, pumpkin bread or chestnut bread.

Choco pies are a very famous Korean snack, which resembles a chocolate and marshmallow filled cookie. Most traditional bakeries in Korea sell hand-made choco pies, but commercial varieties can also be bought at grocery stores.

Sora-ppang (소라 빵; "sora bread") is in the shape of a shell and filled with a mocha filling.

Hwangnam bread (황남빵), also referred to as Gyeongju bread (경주빵), is a traditional Korean bun filled with red bean paste.

Mochi bread (모찌 빵) is a Japanese-inspired sweet bread filled with a variety of fillings like cheese, chocolate and matcha.

=== Traditional bread gallery ===
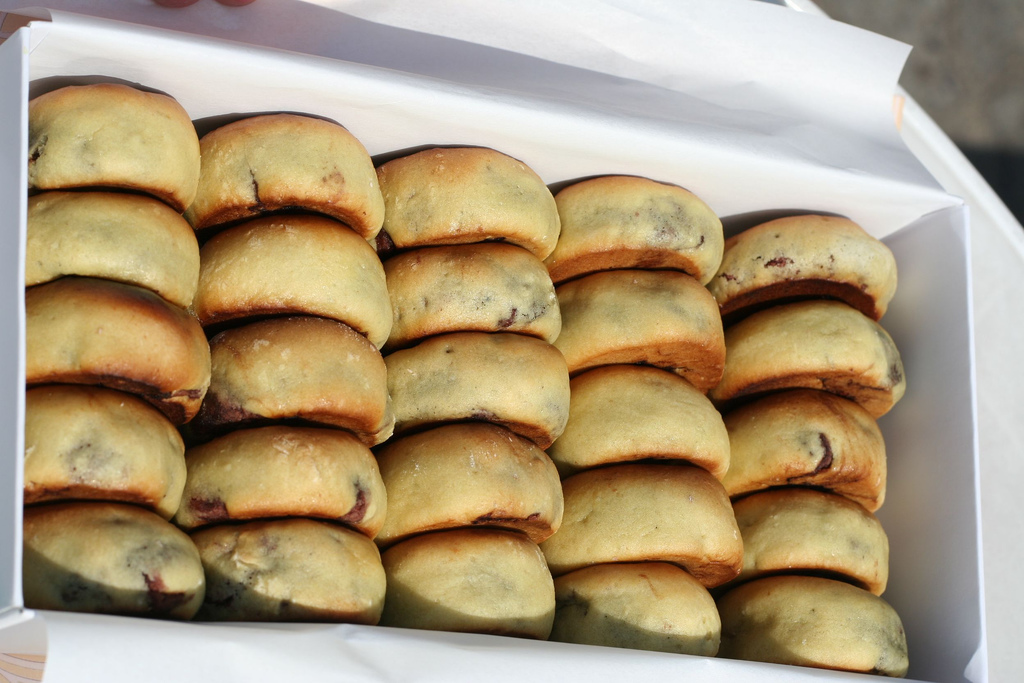
Gyeongju Bread

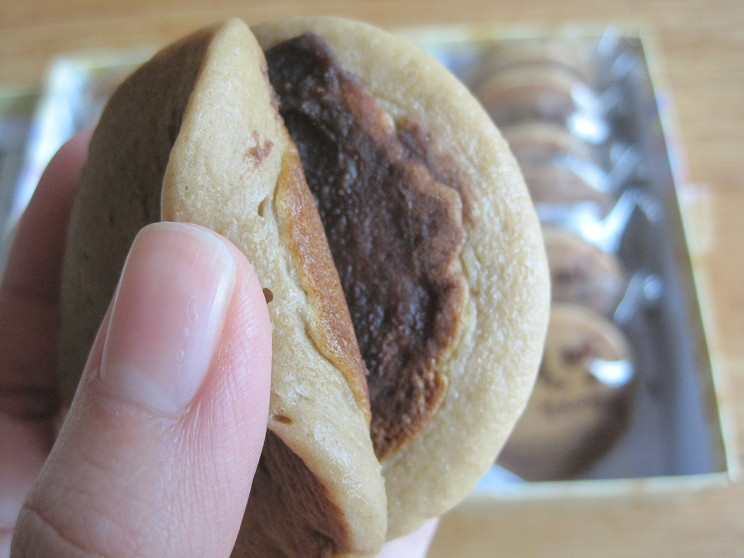
Chalbori-ppang (찰보리빵) Glutinous Barley Bread

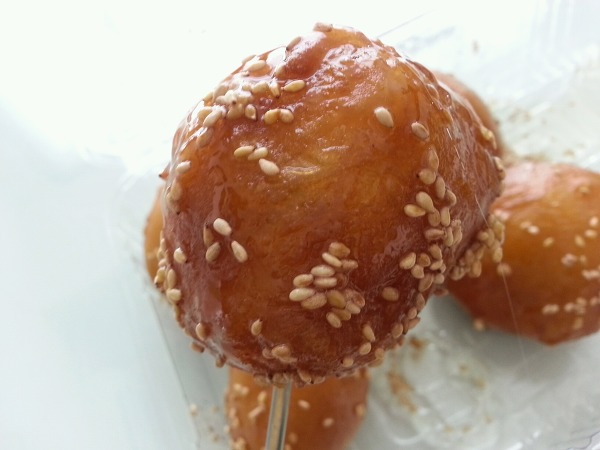
Kkulppang (꿀빵) Honey Bread

==== Modern bread gallery ====
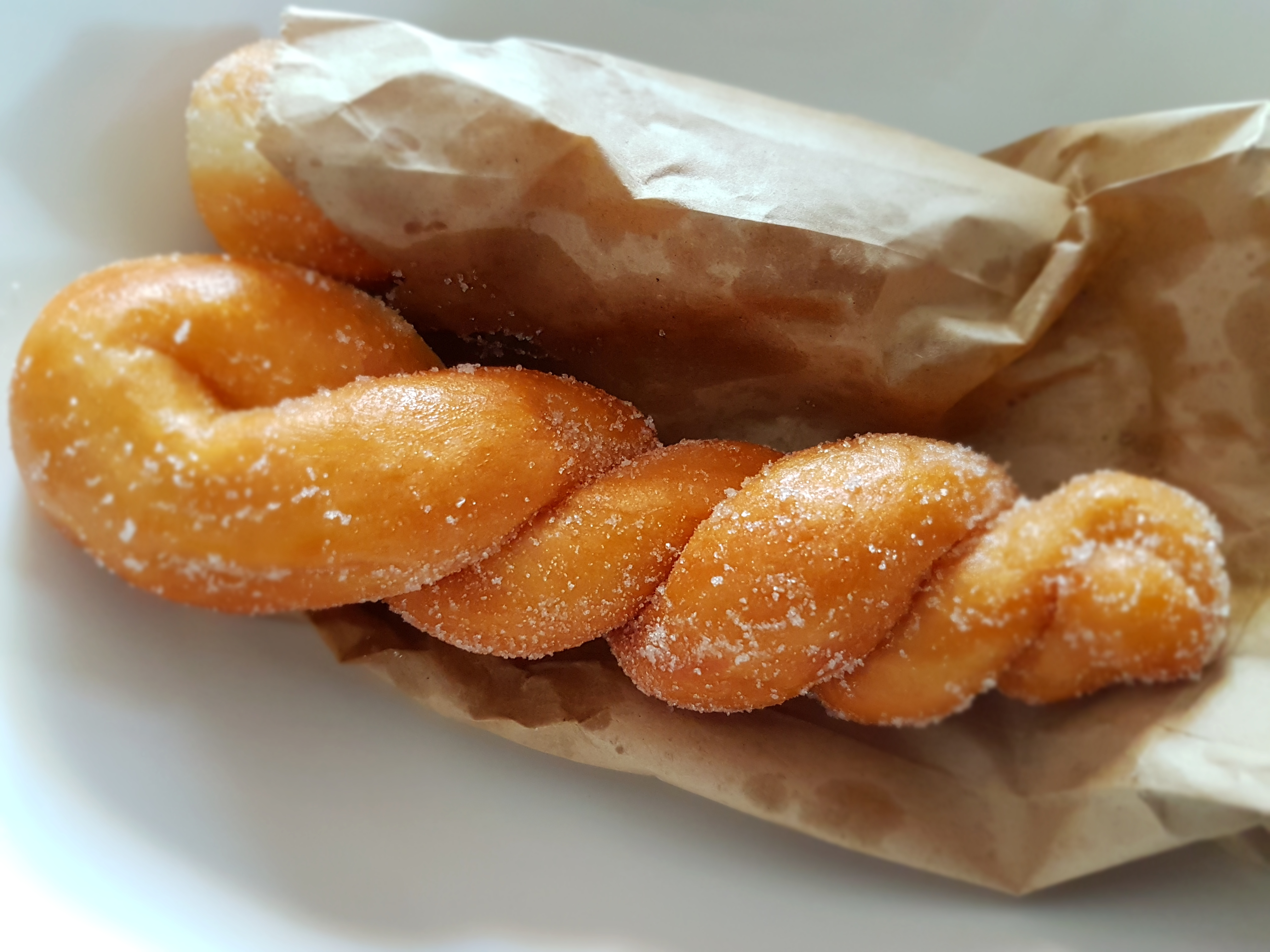
Twisted doughnut (kkwabaegi)

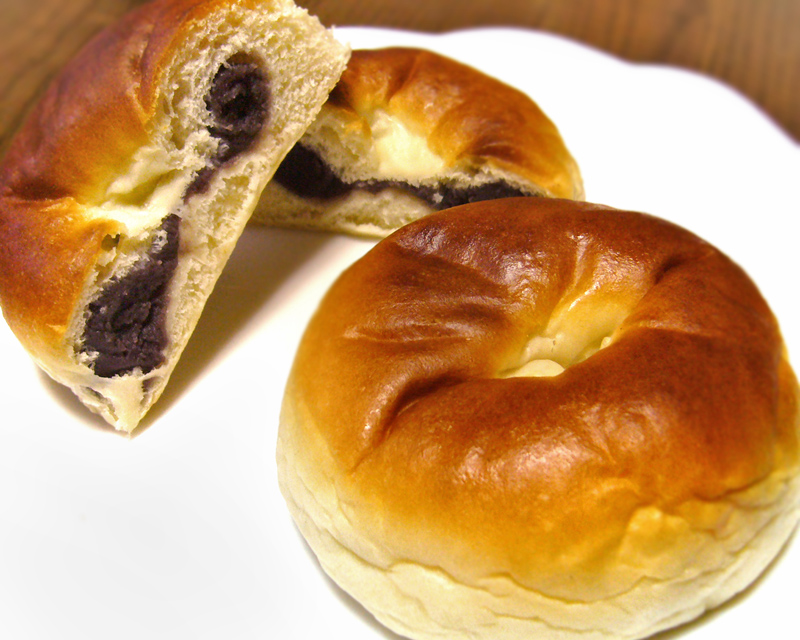
Red Bean Bun

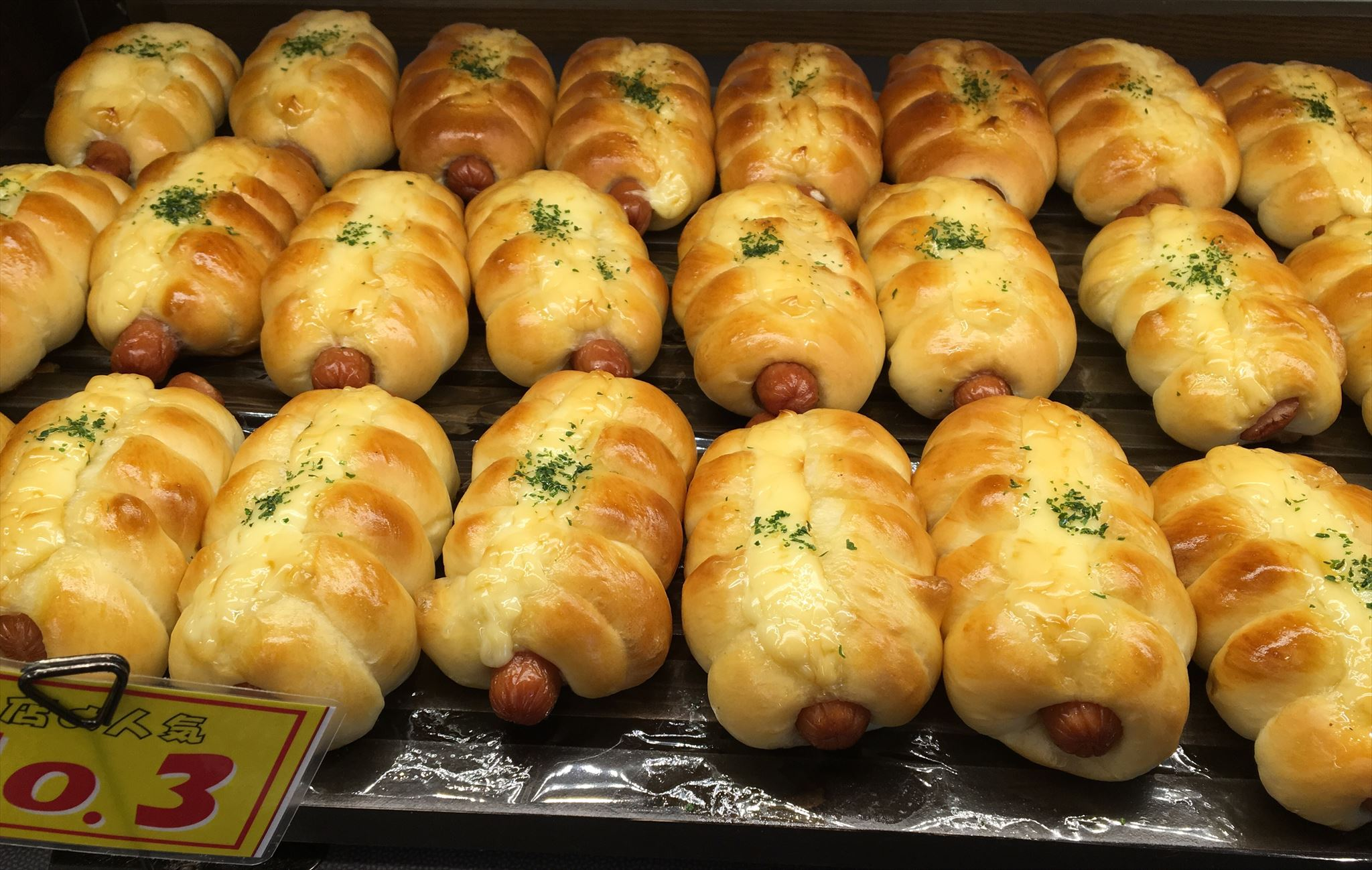
Hot Dog Buns

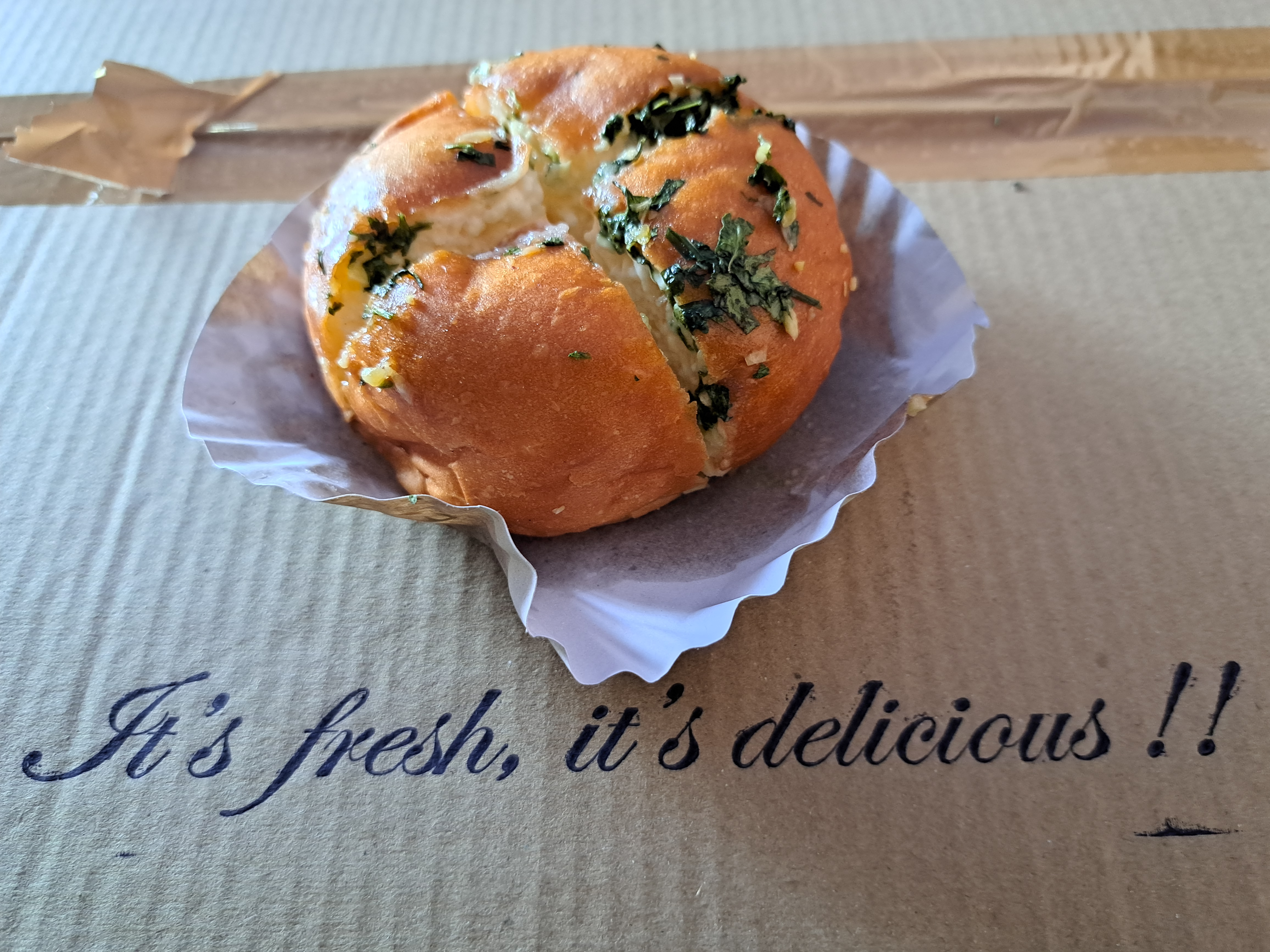
Cheese bun

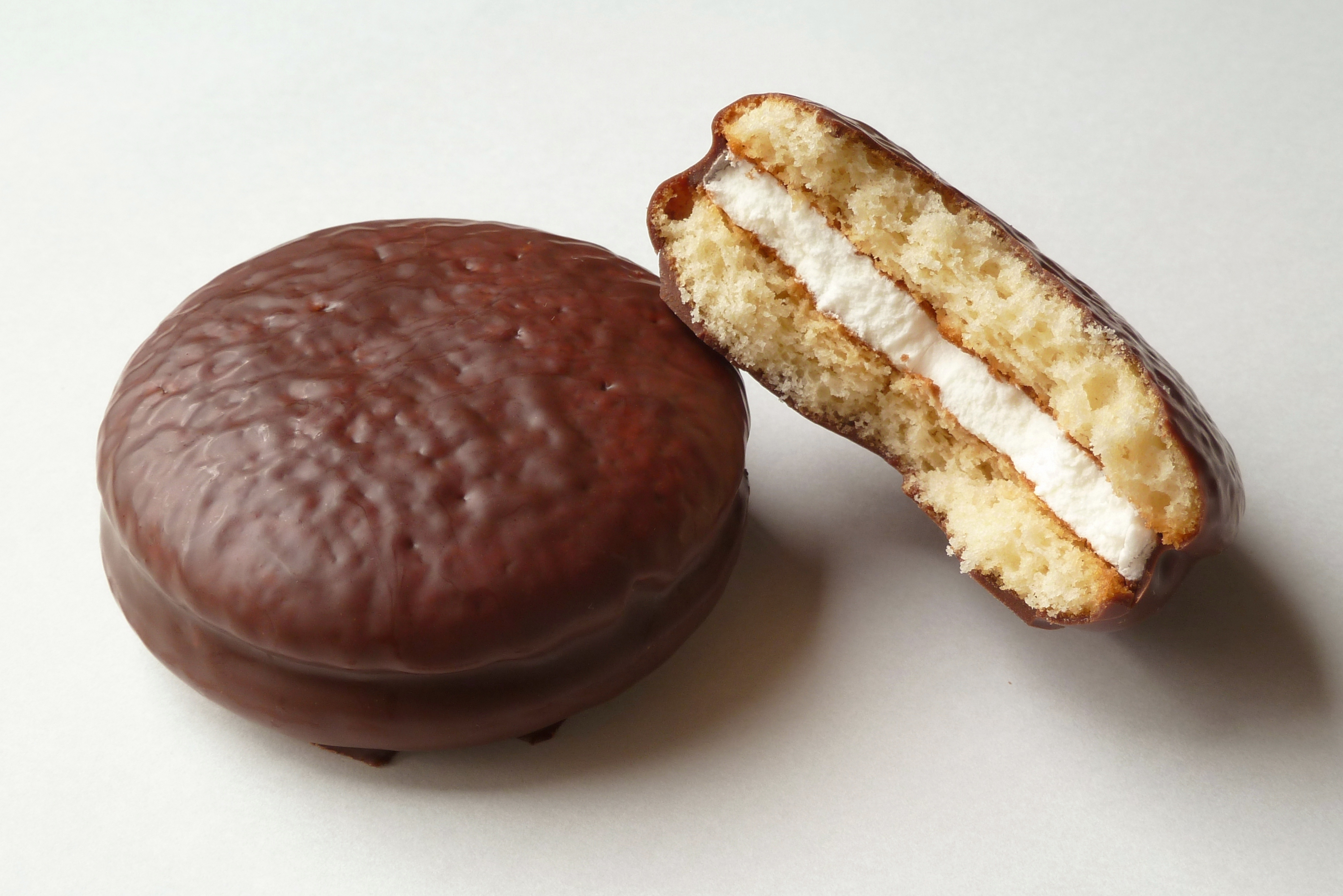
Choco Pie

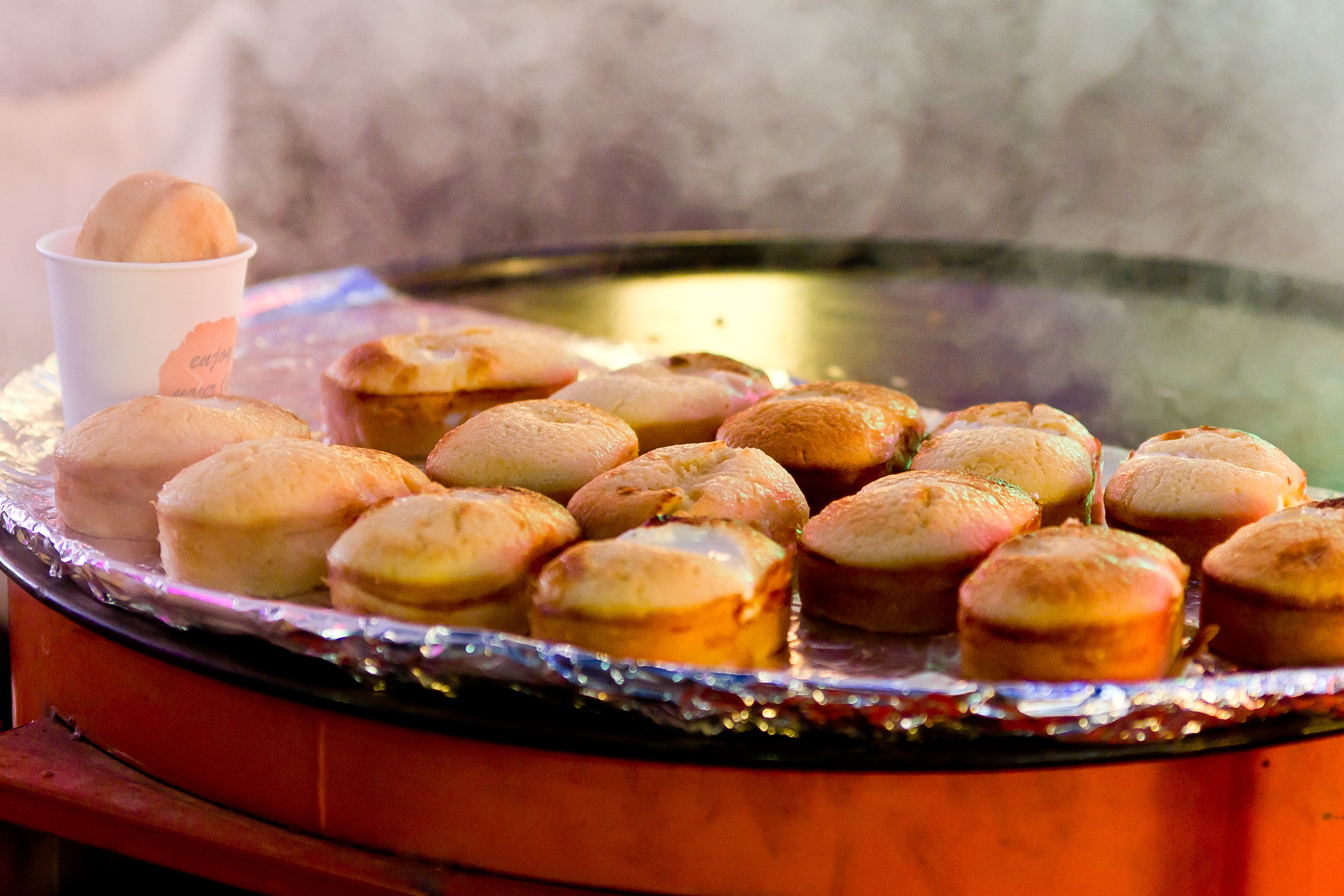
Gyeranppang (계란빵; "egg bread")

=== Cafe culture ===
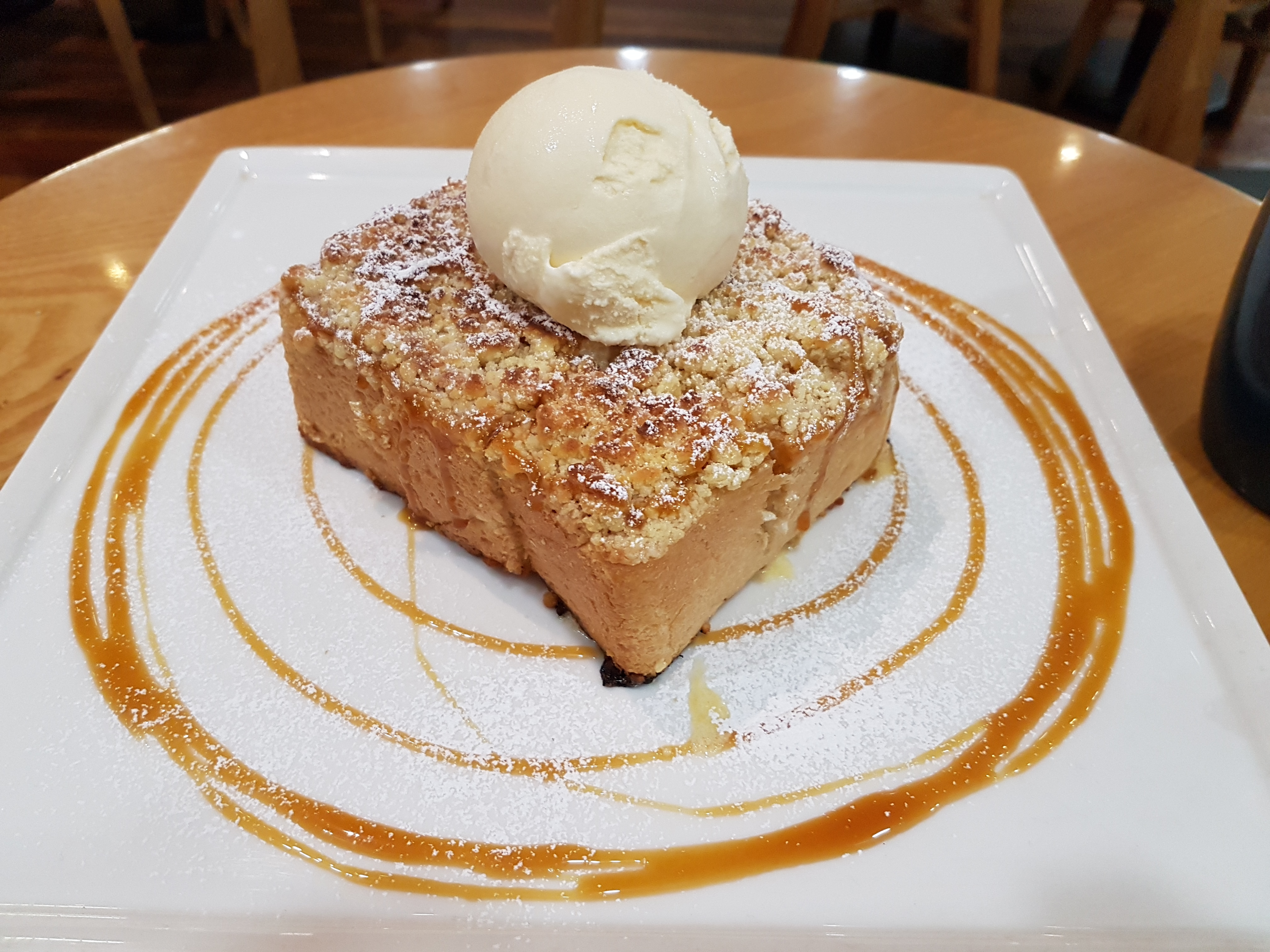
Korean Honey Butter Toast (허니브레드)

Cafe culture in South Korea only truly began to accelerate in the 1980s when modern coffee houses began to emerge. Today there are now over 20,000 cafe shops in South Korea, of which there are 1,008 Starbucks alone. At any cafe one can expect to see people residing there for hours working, meeting friends or studying. Most cafes offer customers access to free wifi and power to charge technological devices, hence they have become popular destinations among young people. The trend is an effect of Koreans embracing the Western-style coffee shop experience.

Traditional Korean breakfast consisted of rice, kimchi and soup. But modernisation of Korean cuisine as a result of Western influence has meant toast and cereals have had an increasing presence in the Korean diet. One feature of this is the invention of "honey butter toast". "Honey toast" is a large, fluffy white bread that has been coated in butter, honey and caramel and topped with whipped cream, syrup, nuts and sometimes fruit. Injeolmi toast is baked white bread that is stuffed with glutinous rice and variations may top it with garlic cheese, citron or honey and ice cream. These are two breakfast menu items typically at South Korean cafes.

== History ==
Globalization has resulted in a shift in the Korean diet and eating culture. Foods like kimchi and bap ("rice") are more commonly being replaced with bread and meat. Traditionally bread had not been a part of the Korean cuisine or diet as it has been the staple in Western and European countries. Some types of steamed breads made of a mix of wheat and rice flour have been a part of Korean and Asian diets, however these were introduced from Central Asia in the 13th century. In most East Asian countries, rice is still the staple food item and bread is typically reserved as a breakfast food, snack and on some occasions, a dessert.

Modernization of Korean cuisine grew in the 1980s and the 1990s. The gradual opening of South Korean markets internationally over this period allowed for even greater amounts of grain-based products to enter the diets of Koreans along with other foods. This changed the basic diet of Koreans greatly in the past several decades. Rice consumption has decreased markedly: according to statistics compiled by the National Statistical Office, per capita annual rice consumption has decreased from 106.5 kg in 1995 to 61 kg in 2016. This steady decline reflects the increased prominence of other foods such as instant foods, processed meats and the increasing use of bread and noodles in meals. Bread in Korea also signifies a social change as more and more young people are choosing the convenience and affordability of bread over other traditional snacks.

Health trends in Korea and the country's increasing on-the-go lifestyle has resulted in an increase in the consumption of staple breads and rolls. Products that can be consumed quickly and easily, like energy and cereal bars, show strong growth in intake in South Korea as a result of the population's busy lifestyle. The popularity of bread and growth of the baked goods market are also a result of the convenience of bread. In family households, working mothers will typically make toast for breakfast because it is easier and faster to prepare than a Korean style breakfast.

The bread and bakery products market is expected to grow annually by 3.3% (CAGR 2019-2023). Moreover, reports by the Ministry of Agriculture, Food and Rural Affairs show sales of unhealthy products like doughnuts and pies had decreased. According to the Ministry of Agriculture, Food and Rural Affairs, in 2016 the total production capacity in the baking industry stood at 2.1 trillion won, which was an 11.8% increase from 1.9 trillion won four years ago. Amongst baked goods produced individual bread products like red bean pastries have had the highest level of production at 48.1%, followed by cakes (34.5%), sliced loaf bread (8.7%) and doughnuts (3.8%). The industry saw total sales grow 49.6% from 3.9 trillion won in 2012 to 5.9 trillion won in 2016, an average annual increase of 10.6%. In relation to Asia-Pacific region, the bread & rolls market grew by 6.1% in 2014 to reach a value of $20,215.5 million. In 2019, the bread & rolls market in Asian-Pacific is forecast to have a value of $27,731.7 million, an increase of 37.2% since 2014.

Overall, South Korea has seen rapid expansion of dessert cafés and unpackaged baked goods from specialist coffee shops and small bakery specialists. Baked goods, artisanal bread, cake and pastries continue to show strong performance as a growing supplementary food item.

== Franchises ==
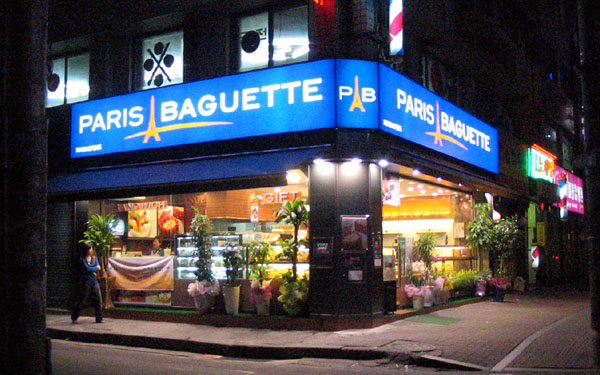
Paris Baguette (1988), the leading South Korean bakery chain

Franchises Paris Baguette and Tous Les Jours are leaders in the Asian baked goods market. The first Paris Baguette Korea opened in South Korea in 1988 by the SPC Group. As of 2018, Paris Baguette had over 3,316 stores in South Korea and has launched 185 stores internationally in countries such as China, Vietnam, Singapore and France. Paris Baguette is still the largest chain in South Korea and holds 80% of the market share. Subsidiaries of SPC Group, such as Samlip General Food, include the largest manufacturers of packaged baked goods in South Korea. The diverse product range and growing expansion of the company is a tribute to its growing success. Paris Baguette was also ranked number one for brand recognition and brand power.

Tous Les Jours was established by the CJ Group in 1996 and has over 1300 locations in Asia and the US. Tous Les Jours accounts for about one-fifth of the market share.

The popularity of baked goods in Korea and Korean peoples affinity for all things trendy, has allowed for some foreign bakeries to enter the market. French chains like Brioche Doree and Gontran Cherrier, as well as New York-based Magnolia Bakery are among the overseas chains entering the local market.

Brioche Doree opened in 2013 in South Korea using ingredients directly shipped from France. Despite being relatively more expensive than its competitors, people still frequent their stores for the authenticity of their products.

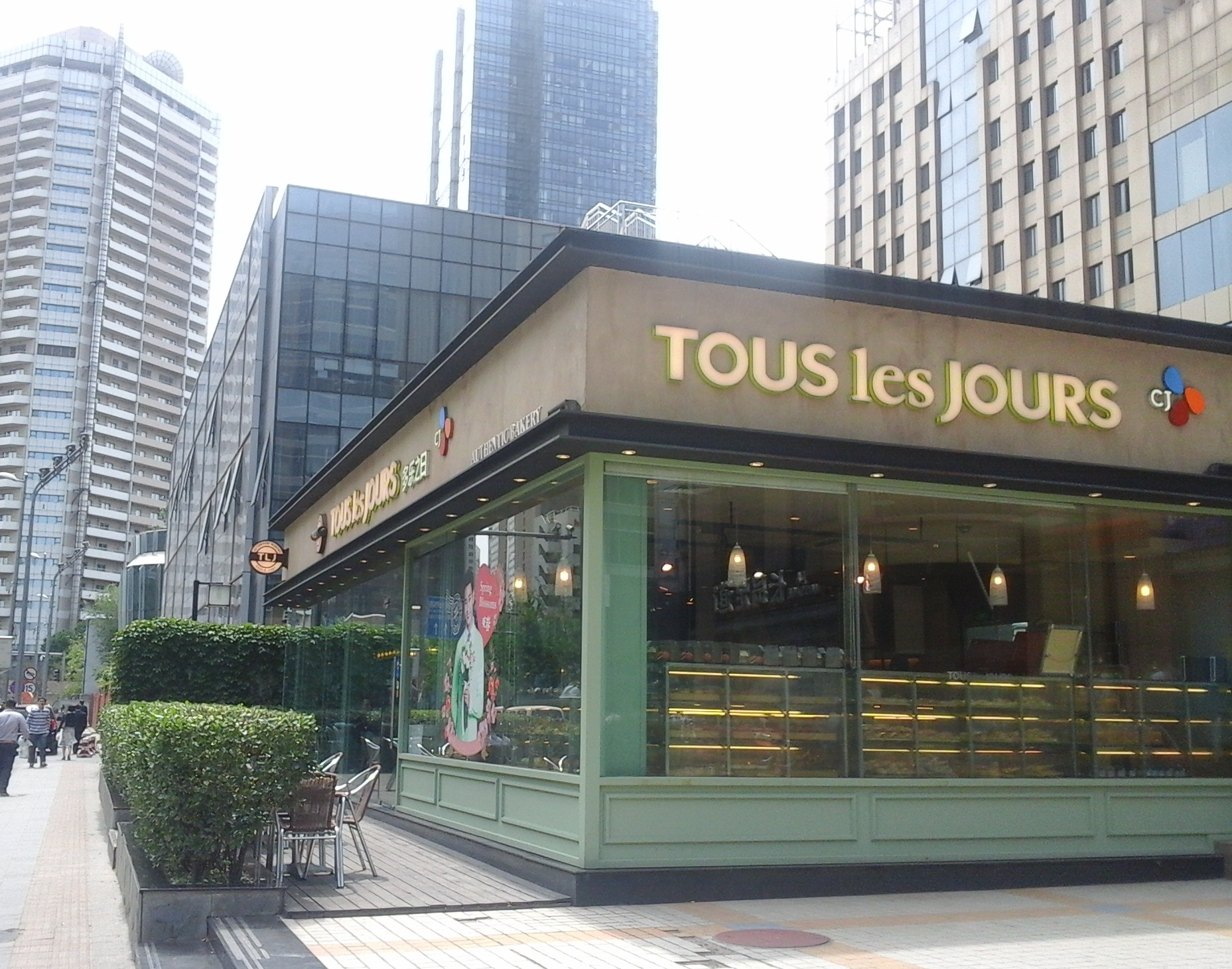
Tous les Jours, founded in 1996

The remainder of the market not operated by conglomerates are local, independent bakeries known as "동네빵집; dongneh ppangchib; 'town bakeries'".

Bakeries selling Korean style breads can be found all over the world and some of largest chains today include Grupo Bimbo, BreadTalk Group and Yamazaki Baking. The Chinese market is fast becoming the largest consumers of baked goods since foreign bakeries entered the market in the 1990s. Since then, businesses trying to reach success in China, like in other Asian markets, have aimed to strike a balance between making breads that look like Western baked goods but are filled with cream and are sweet and buttery in flavour. In another area, the market is trying to reach consumers that are more health conscious and thus certain bakeries like Brioche Doree produce breads that have less oil and less sugar but still have cream and cheese filling to meet consumers' requirements and taste preferences.

== See also ==
- Gyeran-ppang
- Hoppang
- Hotteok
- List of Korean desserts
- Street Food in South Korea
- List of Chinese Baked Products
- List of breads
