= Street food in South Korea =

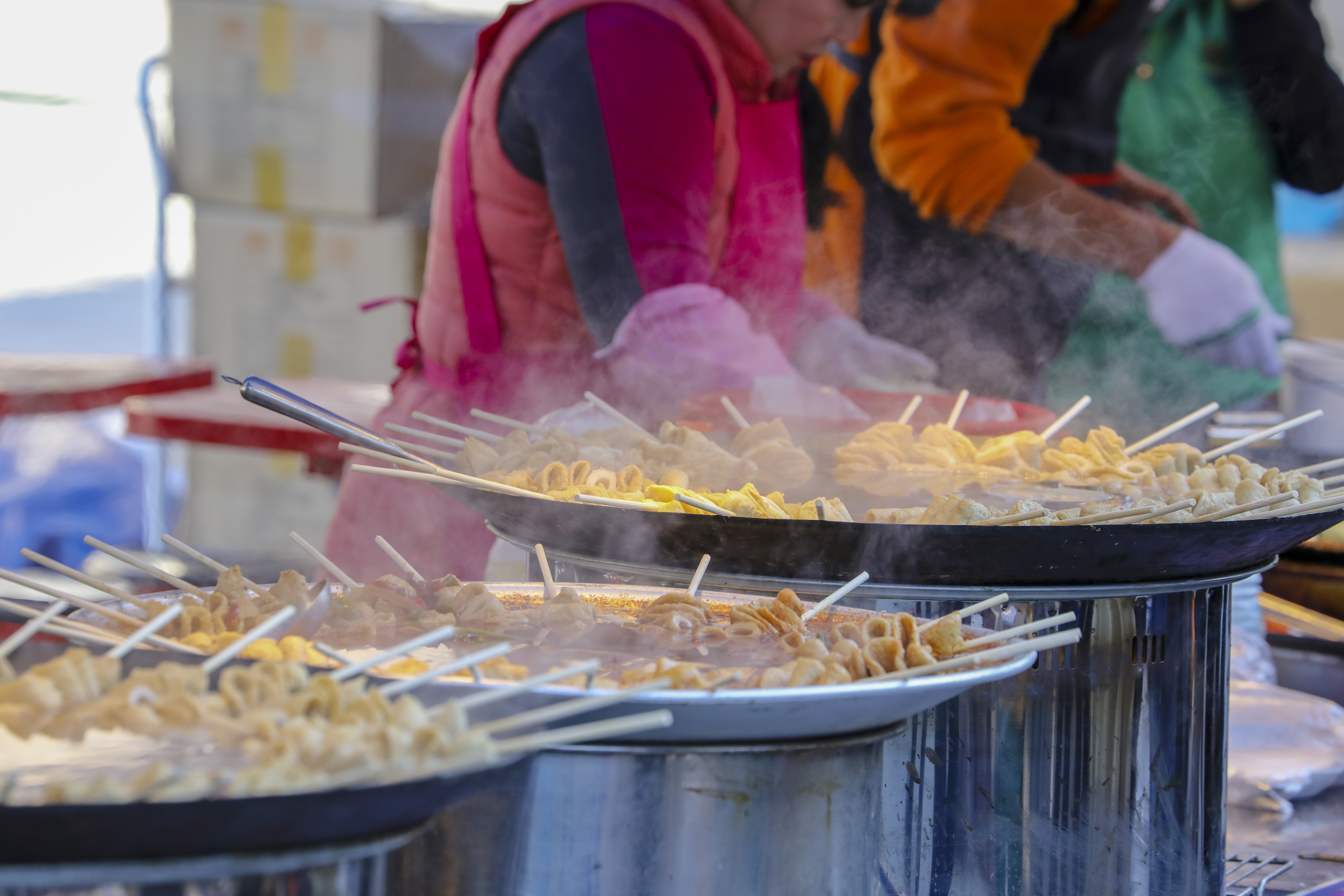
Street food for sale in Seoul (2018)

Street food in South Korea (Korean: 한국의 길거리 음식) has traditionally been seen as a part of popular culture in South Korea. Historically, street food mainly included foods such as eomuk, bungeo-ppang and tteok-bokki. Street food has been sold through many types of retail outlets, with numerous new varieties being developed over time. In recent years, street food has seen a popular resurgence in South Korea.

== History ==
There are many kinds of traditional street food in South Korea. For example, glutinous rice cake (called Chapssal-tteok) with buckwheat jelly, dalgona, which is a candy made from baking soda and sugar, a fish shaped bun with bean jam called Bungeo-ppang, roasted sweet potato, and Chinese pancakes with brown sugar filling (called Hotteok). The traditional street foods are most common in the winter season; in the summer season ice cream is more popular.

In the Joseon period street vendors began to form a base of economic activity in the low-income bracket around markets. After the Korean War street vendors prospered by serving refugees and the large numbers of U.S. troops. Street food's influences come from the Cheonggyecheon Stream, Itaewon, and Jongno districts. Street food has become an important part of food culture in South Korea.

After the Korean War, street food vendors made a huge impact on people who had a lower standard of living by providing them with affordable meals. It was in the 1300s when food stalls started to arise at the Joseon markets. Before the 1960s, most of the food sold at street stalls were jinppang (찐빵), steamed bread filled with red-bean paste, and hoppang (호빵), steamed buns that could be filled with vegetables or meats. These traditional snacks could easily be called 'the ancestors of Korean street food', since they were passed down to Korea from Japan during the early 1900s. Foods such as jinppang and hoppang started to sell in food vendors in the 1960 and additional items like tteobokki and gimbap made their ways in the 1970s.

== Contemporary development ==
In the past, hotteok, fish cake skewers, a fish-shaped bun, and other snack foods were usually street food. Nowadays jokbal, steak cubes and jajangmyeon are served as meals. So street food is sometimes referred to as a "moving restaurant."

There are issues with street vendors. First, there are concerns with the hygiene of street food, although street vendors have tried address this issue. Secondly, street vendors do not usually pay tax; although after government promises of financial assistance the vendors made a commitment to pay taxes, for example in Noryangjin district. A third issue relates to selling by squatters, usually elderly people, in subway stations, where it is illegal.

Street food in South Korea has become gentrified and diverse, much like other regional or national foods, for example: Chinese Tanghuru, Kebob's, Turkish ice cream, Chilean Churros, etc. Food ordered is served within 2–3 minutes. Street foods are intended to be visually appealing as well as delicious, and the preparation can be an entertainment in itself, for example watching a vendor's hands as they roast the ingredients on an iron plate.

There are some festivals related to street food: for example, the Night Market at Hangang Park and university festivals. In addition, with the advent of the steak cube, an era of luxury street food has begun.

== Forms of street food ==
- Food truck: Recently, food trucks have become a new trend in food culture. In Korea today, the food truck is a popular purveyor of street food, prevalent in parks and culture-art spaces.

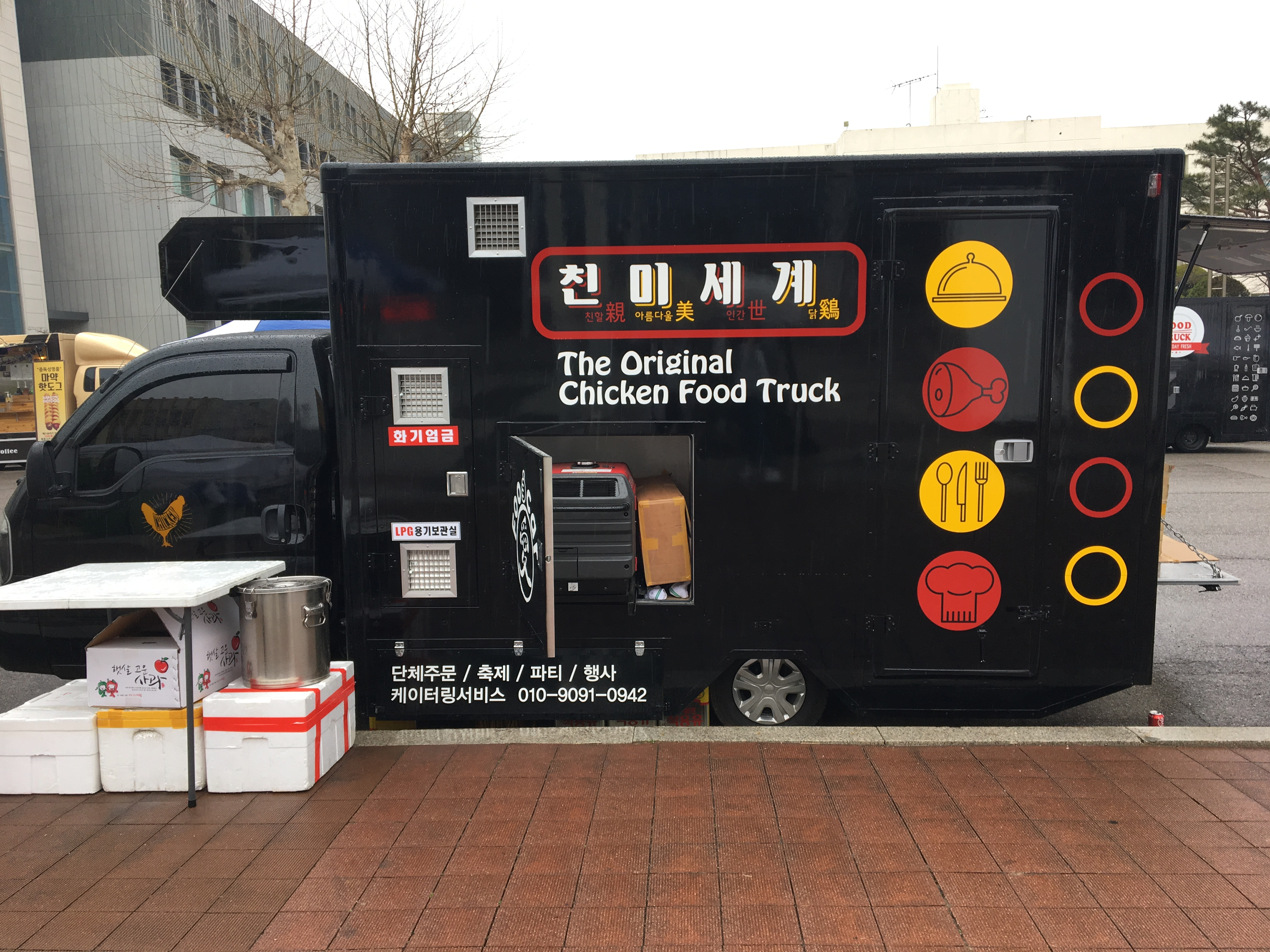
Street food in South Korea

- Food bike: It is called a food bike because food is sold from a bicycle; pedal propelled, or motorised ifa tricycle. This is new in Korea and it is planned to exhibit the first prototype in Gyeonggi-Do, and conduct a trial run.
- Pojangmacha: A pojangmacha is a small tented spot that can be on wheels or a street stall in South Korea that sells a variety of street foods, such as hotteok, gimbap, tteokbokki, sundae, dakkochi (Korean skewered chicken), odeng, mandu, and anju (dishes accompanied with drinking). In the evening, many of these establishments also serve alcoholic beverages such as soju. Pojangmacha literally means "covered wagon" in Korean.

The number of pojangmacha in Seoul has recently declined, due to people claiming the establishments are unsanitary and illegal, since many vendors operate without permits (Deborah 2018). Many pojangmacha owners however still maintain the tradition alive, selling foods such as dakbal (chicken feet) and dakkochi (skewered chicken).

== Popular street food locations ==
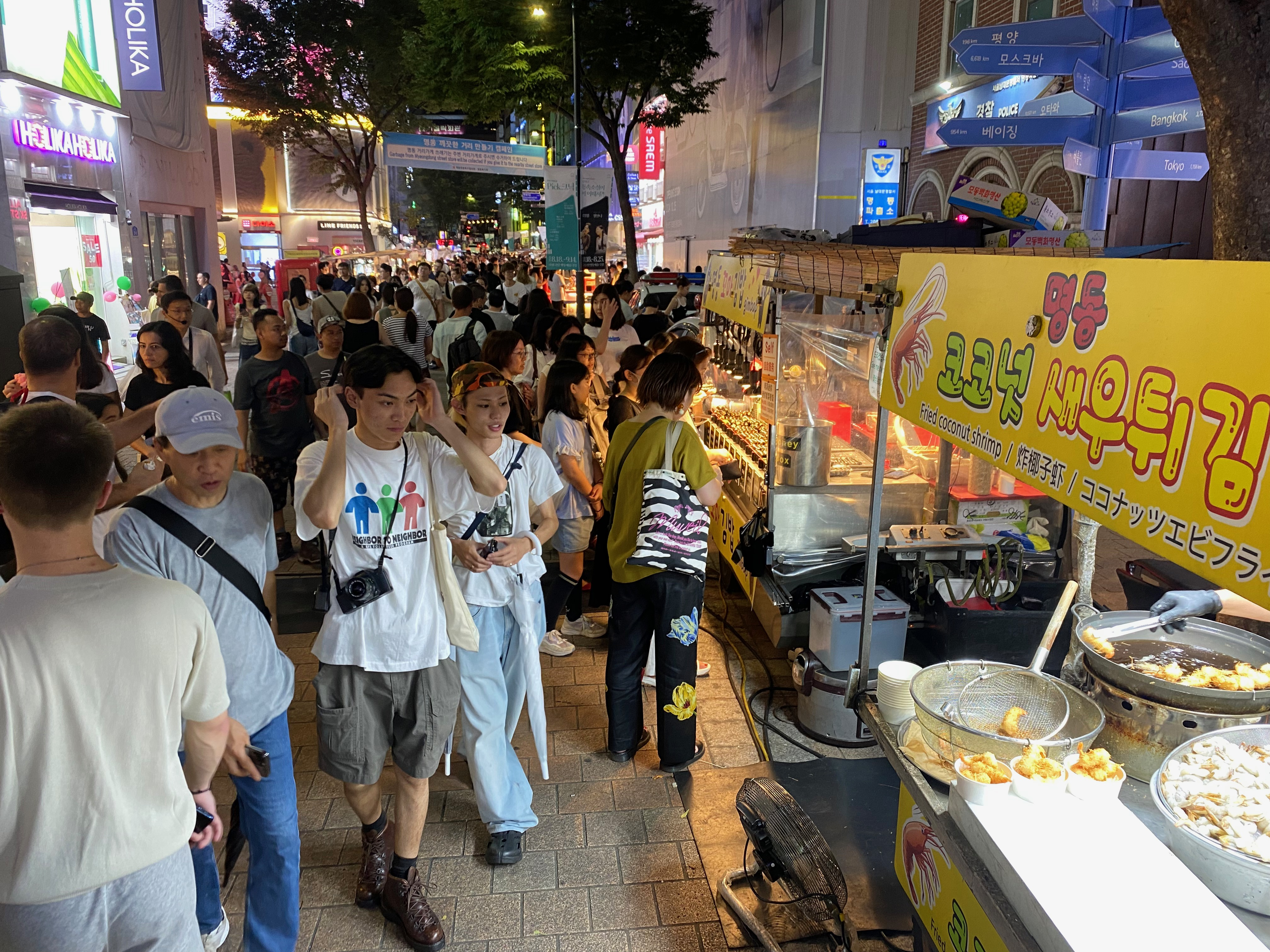
An abundance of street food at the Myeong-dong night market in Seoul

Traditionally, street food was only seen at markets or on crowded streets, but in recent years, street food has become more widespread. In some regions, dedicated street food streets have been built.

Kkangtong Market: Kkangtong Market in Busan was the first permanent night market to appear in South Korea. There are many exotic street foods, including fusion rice balls with Japanese pork and kimchi, Vietnamese deep-fried dumplings, mie goreng (Indonesian fried noodles), and more.

Myeong-dong: Myeong-dong is very popular for street foods, featuring traditional foods like chicken skewers as well as unique foods like deep-fried blue crab and grilled scallops. The street food of Myeong-dong has become popular among foreign tourists. There are 200 stalls in Myeong-dong, half of which are food stalls.

Hongdae: Hongdae, also called the Mecca of Youth, has a large variety of street foods. There are Korean street foods such as tteokbokki, dakgangjeong, hotteok, fish cake, bungeoppang, and rice cake skewers, and global foods such as churros, crepes, and takoyaki.

Noryangjin: Noryangjin's street food can be found near exit 1 of Noryangjin (Subway line 1), where many street vendors gather. During lunchtimes, the area is often crowded with students. Recently, Noryanjing has become popular with tourists after publicity on social media started by international students.

Jeonju: This market has many street foods with Korean characteristics. There are foods like "bibimbap croquettes", "bibimbap baguettes", and "bibimbap dumplings”, which are twists on Korean traditional foods, and local food made using food ingredients from Jeonbuk. It is located on Jeonju Street.

Gwangjang Market: A traditional market in Seoul, South Korea, known for its food stalls and Korean cuisine. Among the foods associated with the market is mayak gimbap, small seaweed-wrapped rolls containing rice, carrot, and pickled radish, often seasoned with sesame oil. Other foods sold at the market include bindaetteok, a savory pancake made from ground mung beans, meat and vegetables, and makgeolli, a traditional Korean rice wine. The market was established in 1905 and was the first permanent market in Korea to operate daily.

Namdaemun Market: Appearing around the 1400s, it is considered to be Seoul's oldest market, along with being the largest market, with over 10,000 different types of stalls. The Food Alley features a variety of Korean dishes such as steamed corn, dakkochi (chicken skewers), jokbal (pigs' feet), and more. Much of the food of the market are considered to be timeless "classics", and much of the market is considered rather affordable. In addition to food, Namdemun Market features jewelry, luggage, stationery, hiking gear, camera parts, traditional handicrafts, and more.

Seoul Bamdokkaebi Night Market – The Seoul Bamdokkaebi Night Market is known for its international fusion, blending foods of many different cultures. In nighttime, the market provides food and festivities. The majority of the stalls are in food trucks which provides unique fusion foods such as Cuban sandwiches, tacos infused in a Korean style, steak and cups, lobster types of rolls, and more. It is crowded and has long lines due to being in a busy area along the Han River.

== Examples of South Korean street foods ==
Name	Description	Image
Beondegi	Steamed or boiled silkworm larvae which are seasoned and eaten as a snack	
Bungeoppang	This fish-shaped bun filled with sweet red beans is a classic street snack. It is known to have come from Japan in the 1930s. Taiyaki which was famous in Japan became Bungeoppang. In Japanese, "Tai" means sea bream, and "yaki" means roasted. So this is a cheap street snack which imitates the more expensive Japanese food. It was the most common street food in the 1950s and 1960s, after the Japanese colonial period. It has appeared again since the 1990s.	
Cup-bap	a food truck offering that consists of bap (rice) in a paper or plastic cup with a variety of toppings.	
Dak-kkochi	Dak-kkochi, called Korean chicken skewers, is a popular South Korean street food consisting of small pieces of chicken and scallions grilled on a skewer.	
Dalgona	A Korean sweet candy made from melted sugar and baking soda. A nostalgic Korean street candy symbolizing childhood playfulness, popularized globally as a cultural icon representing challenge, memory, and simple sweetness.	
Eomuk	Fish cake is a mixture of fish meat and wheat flour. The hot sauce flavored with soy sauce can be addictive to many. Eomuk is also a typical Japanese food. It used to be called oden; Japanese oden is boiled tofu, fish cake, konjac, jelly, and boiled egg on a skewer. It was after the time of enlightenment in 1876 that the eomuk tang (fish cake soup) was brought to Korea. It entered Korea at the port of Bu-san and became a widespread Korean street food. As the home of fish cake history, Busan boasts that its fish cake is the best in Korea.	
Galbi	Galbi is a term which means rib and typically come from pork or chicken. It is a popular dish where the meat is marinated with a mixture of soy sauce, garlic, sugar, and sesame seeds. It is usually placed on a stick since the stick is readily available to dispose and to cook on a grill. Of course, beef galbi can be used to make soup (galbitang) and steamed galbi (galbijjim). But these dishes, while excellent in their own right, are overshadowed by their grilled leader.	
Gimbap	Gimbap looks like a big Japanese sushi roll. But unlike sushi, it isn't made with vinegared rice. Instead, it's made with cooked white rice rolled in seaweed with vegetables and other ingredients like meat, fish, egg, and cheese.	
Gukhwappang	Small pastries that are shaped like chrysanthemum flowers and filled with red bean paste	
Gunbam	Gunbam is a street food that is considered one of the most popular snacks in winter. It is a roasted chestnut baked in a brazier, which tastes both savory and sweet.	
Gyeran-ppang	Gyeran-ppang (egg bread) is a warm street snack sold throughout South Korea. The fluffy, oblong-shaped loaf of bread is sweet and savory with a whole egg inside the pancake dough.	
Hotteok	Hotteok is a traditional street food in South Korea. It is commonly eaten in the winter. Normally, hotteok is made of dough filled with cinnamon-flavored raw sugar. Nowadays, there are varieties of hotteok with nuts like peanuts. or a colored hotteok with green tea powder and corn flour.	
Hoppang	Hoppang means steamed bun in Korean. A steamed bun is made from flour, usually from the United States, and red beans. Ingredients such as vegetables, meat, sweet pumpkin, curry and pizza are added, and additional variants on the hoppang theme are constantly being developed. It can be found both on the street and at convenience stores.	
Jeon	A fritter in Korean cuisine made by seasoning whole, sliced, or minced fish, meat, vegetables, etc., and coating them with wheat flour and egg wash before frying them in oil.	
Jjinppang	A steamed bun, typically filled with red bean paste with bits of broken beans and bean husk.	
Jwipo	A traditional Korean pressed fish jerky sold as a street snack. Made from the filefish (in Korean, jwichi), it is seasoned, flattened, and dried.	
So-tteok-so-tteok	A South Korean street food consisting of skewered and fried garae-tteok (rice cakes) and Vienna sausages brushed with several sauces including mustard and spicy gochujang-based sauce.	
Sundae	Sundae is a type of blood sausage that is mixed with pig intestine and stuffed with cellophane noodles, vegetables, and meat. It's usually served cut up into bite size pieces with lung and liver from the pig on the side as a garnish.	
Tornado potato	A deep fried spiral-cut whole potato on a skewer, similar to a French fry, brushed with various seasonings such as onion, cheese, or honey.	
Tteokbokki	Tteokbokki is stir-fried rice cake, a traditional Korean food. There is a history of food similar to tteokbokki in a book called '食療纂要' compiled at the time of Chosun, Sejo in 1460. Before kochujang tteokbokki, there was food similar to tteokbokki in the old court. In the 1800s cookbook "是議全書", there is a record that "I ate white rice cake with beef sirloin, soy sauce, onion, rice cake and so on." It re-emerged in the late 1960s, with a Kochujang (red chili paste) sauce.	
Tteok-kkochi	A street food consisting of skewered and fried tteok (rice cakes) brushed with spicy gochujang-based sauce.	
Ttongppang	A pastry that is formed in the shape of human feces; it is filled with red bean paste with walnut kernel	
Mandoo	Dumplings in Korean cuisine. They are usually filled with vegetables and meat. Mandu can be steamed, boiled, pan-fried, or deep-fried.	
Memil-muk	Buckwheat jelly is a light gray-brown muk (jelly) made from buckwheat starch. It is commonly served as banchan (a side dish accompanying rice) as well as anju (food accompanying alcoholic drinks).	
10 won bread	A waffle filled with mozzarella cheese in the shape of a coin. Variations of it in other denominations of currency, and also in Japanese yen (and sold in Japan).	

== See also ==
- List of street foods
