= Somi =

Somi may refer to:

- Gabriel Somi (born 1991), Swedish-born Syrian footballer
- Jeon Somi (born 2001), Korean-Canadian singer
- Somi (singer) (born 1981), American singer

== See also ==
- SomiSomi Soft Serve & Taiyaki, U.S based chain of dessert restaurants
