= SomiSomi Soft Serve & Taiyaki =

American chain of dessert restaurants

Somisomi Soft Serve & Taiyaki
- Company type: Private
- Industry: Chain restaurant/Franchise
- Founded: Koreatown, Los Angeles (October 21, 2016; 9 years ago)
- Founder: Matt Kim
- Number of locations: 33
- Area served: United States
- Products: Soft serve & Taiyaki
- Website: www.somisomi.com

Somisomi Soft Serve & Taiyaki is an American chain of independently owned and operated franchised stores based in Los Angeles, California. They primarily serve Korean Bungeo-ppang (fish-shaped pastry) paired with soft serve, known together as ah-boong.

== History ==
Somisomi was founded in October 21, 2016 by Matt Kim in the Koreatown neighborhood of Los Angeles, California. The location quickly gained popularity and built a cult-like following, resulting in a fast expansion across Southern California. These locations include Irvine (Spectrum & Diamond Jamboree), San Diego (Convoy, Mira Mesa, & UTC), Torrance, Garden Grove, Ontario, Little Tokyo, Huntington Beach, Fullerton, Long Beach, and Sawtelle.

In October 2018, Somisomi opened their first location outside of California in Honolulu, Hawaii.

In February 2019, Somisomi opened their first location in Northern California in Cupertino and later expanded to Elk Grove, San Jose, Santa Clara, Sacramento, San Francisco, Natomas, Palo Alto, San Mateo, and Pleasanton.

In July 2019, Somisomi began expanding into Texas, opening a location in Katy. They would later open locations in Frisco, Carrollton, and Sugar Land.

In May 2020, Somisomi opened their first Nevada location in Las Vegas. They would later open a second location in Henderson.

In August 2022, Somisomi opened their first Washington location in Seattle. They would later open a second location in Bellevue.

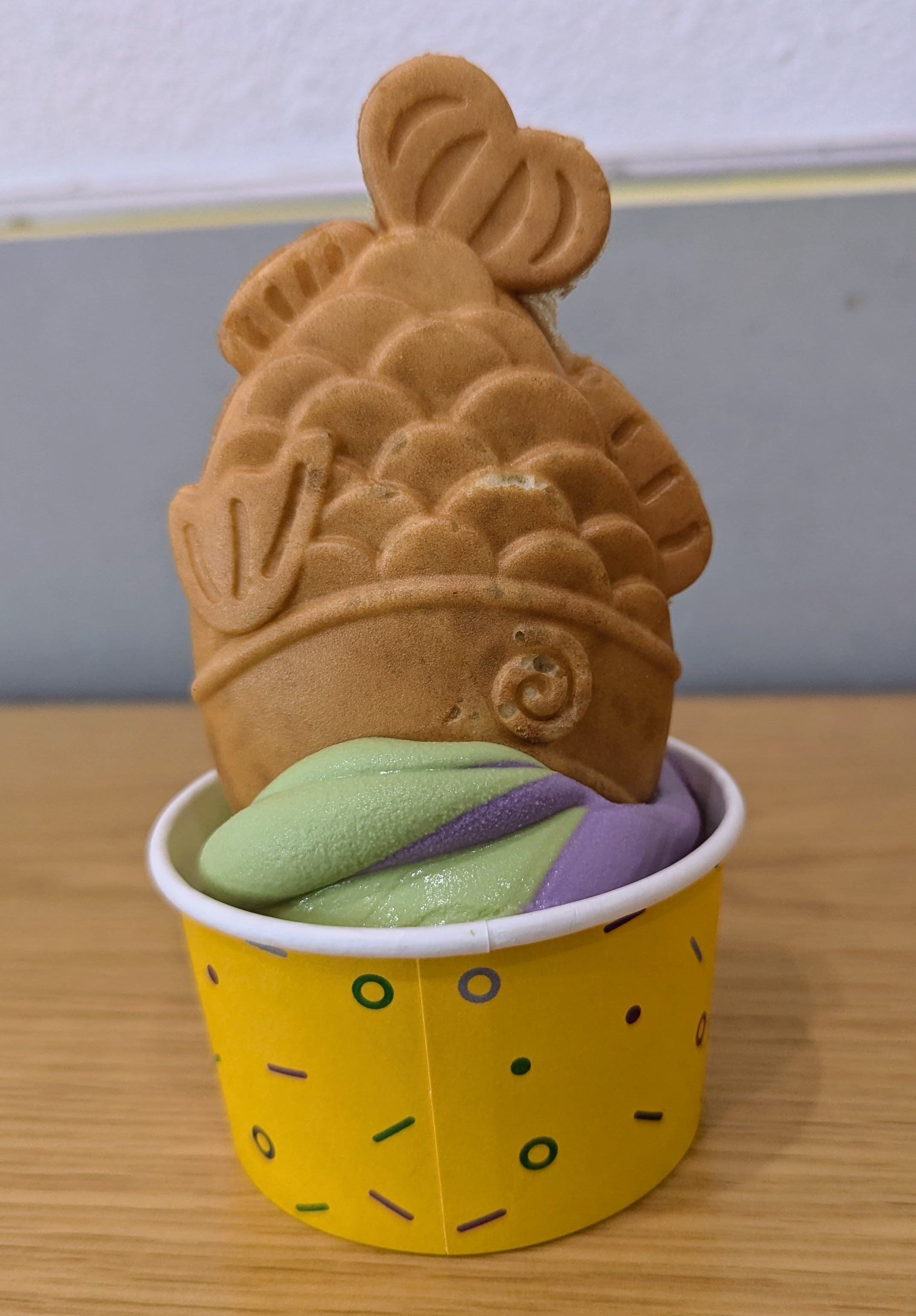
Upside Down Ah-Boong with Matcha/Ube Soft Serve Swirl

In August 2022, SomiSomi opened their first Arizona location in Chandler.
