= Delimanjoo =

South Korean confectionery

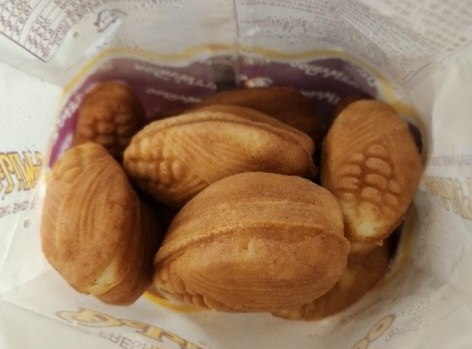
- Delimanjoos in a bag
- Type: snack cake
- Place of origin: South Korea
- Associated cuisine: South Korean cuisine
- Invented: 1998; 28 years ago
- Main ingredients: butter, milk, eggs, salt, custard
- Similar dishes: Manjū, bungeo-ppang

A delimanjoo (Korean: 델리만쥬) is a corn-shaped South Korean pastry made of castella with a custard filling. The term "delimanjoo" was branded by the company Delice (a portmanteau of "delice" and "manjū") following the dessert's first appearance at Myeong-dong station, Seoul in 1998.

Following a period of bankruptcy by its host company, a few of the dessert's trademark rights were transferred.

== History ==
The delimanjoo was founded in 1998. By the early 2000s, roughly 90 franchise stores selling the pastry had been established across subway stations nationwide, beginning with its first location at Myeong-dong station.

Delimanjoos are exported to multiple countries and states, including Taiwan, Hong Kong, Malaysia, and Vietnam.

== See also ==
- Manjū
- Bungeo-ppang
- Street food in South Korea
