= Ttongppang =

Korean poop-shaped bread

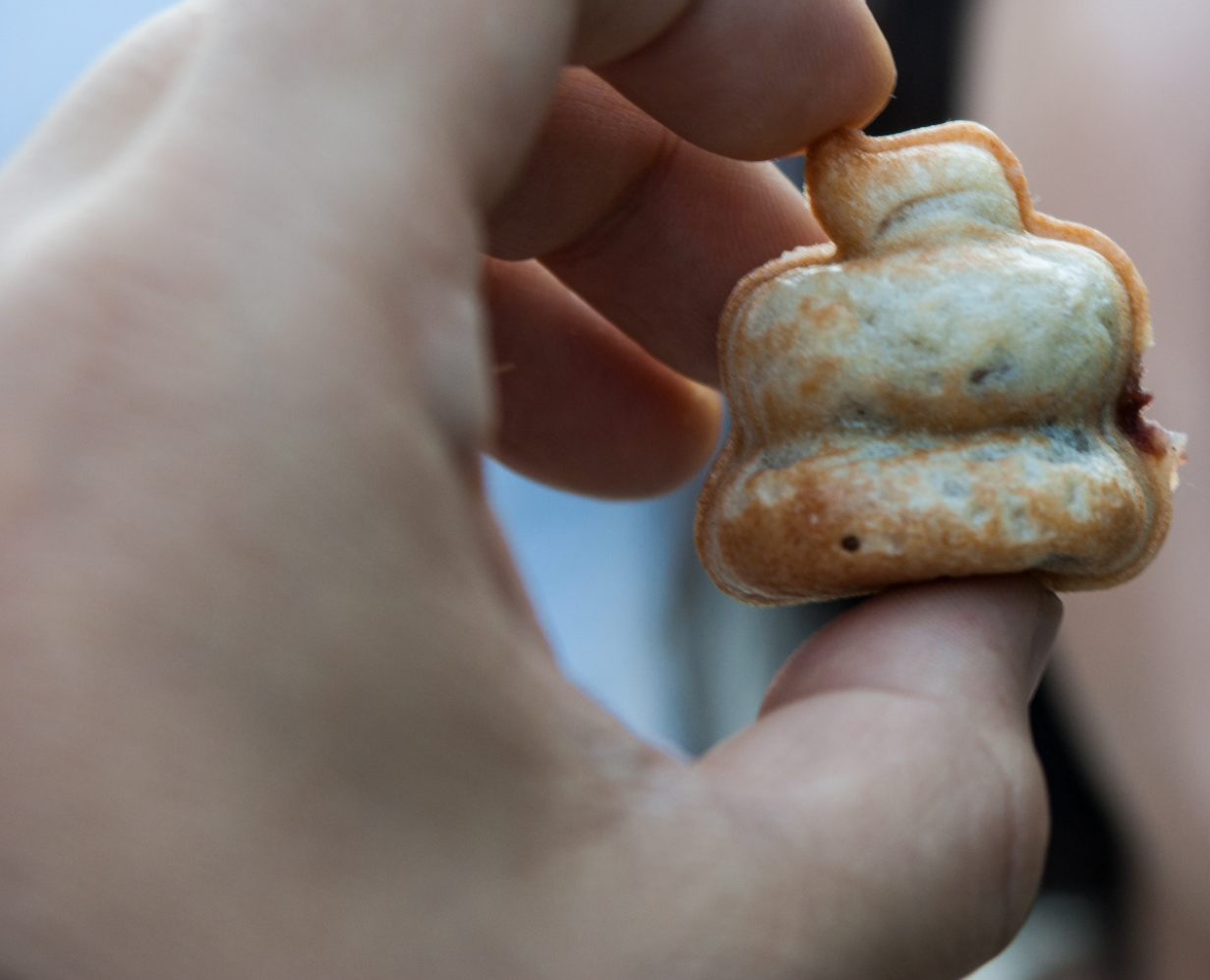
- Hand holding a piece of ttongppang
- Place of origin: South Korea
- Serving temperature: Warm
- Main ingredients: Wheat flour, red bean paste, walnut

Korean name
- Hangul: 똥빵
- Lit.: poo bread
- RR: ttongppang
- MR: ttongppang

Ttongppang (Korean: 똥빵; lit. ''poo bread''), or ddongbbang, is a novelty Korean street food. It is bread filled with red bean paste and walnut bits that is shaped like stylized human feces. It originated in Insa-dong, Seoul, South Korea.

== See also ==
- Gyeranppang, similar Korean food
- List of Korean dishes
- Korean cuisine
