= Hotteok =

Korean-Chinese filled pancake dish

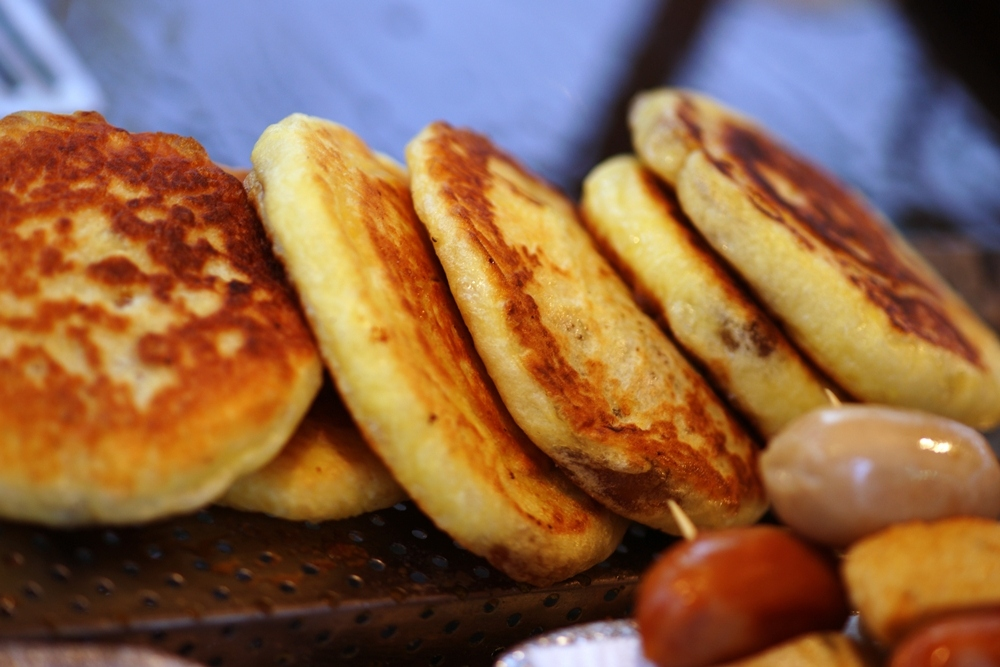
- Type: Pancake
- Place of origin: Korea
- Created by: Chinese merchants from the Qing dynasty
- Main ingredients: Dough: wheat flour, water, milk, sugar, yeast Filling: brown sugar, honey, peanuts, cinnamon

Korean name
- Hangul: 호떡
- Hanja: 胡떡
- RR: hotteok
- MR: hottŏk
- IPA: [ho.t͈ʌk̚]

Hotteok (Korean: 호떡; pronounced [ho.t͈ʌk̚]), sometimes called hoeddeok, is a type of filled pancake known as a popular street food in South Korea. It originated in Qing dynasty China and was first brought into Joseon Korea during the 19th century.

== Preparation ==
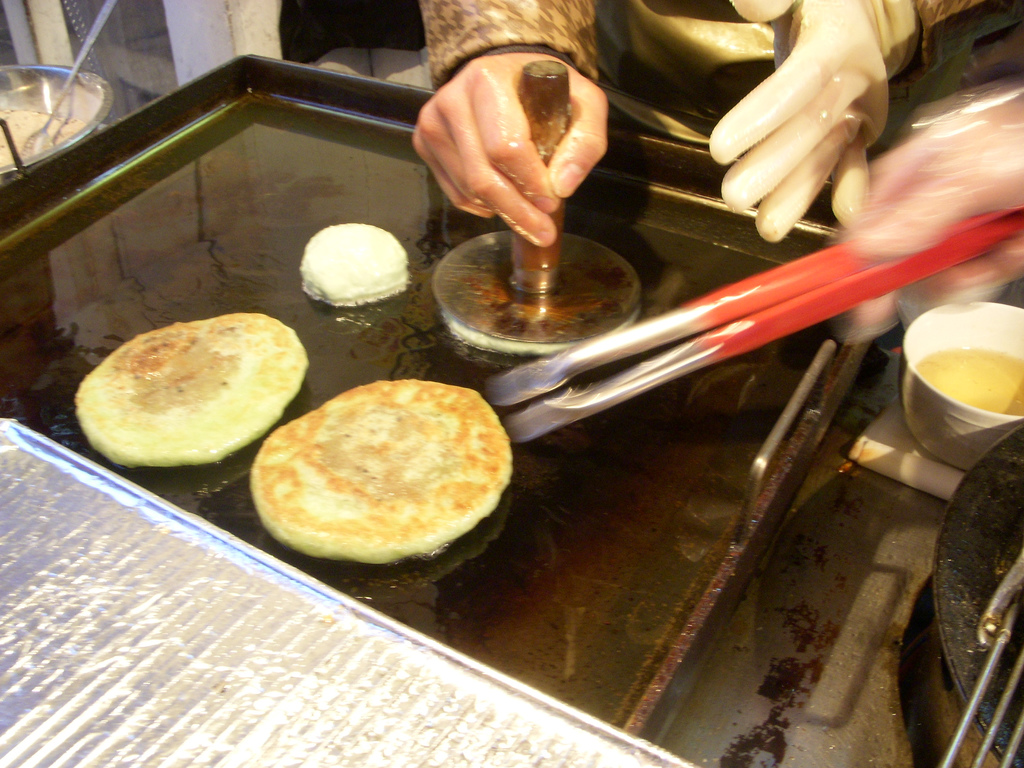
Hotteok being made

The dough for hotteok is made from wheat flour, water, milk, sugar, and yeast. The dough is allowed to rise for several hours. Handful-sized balls of this stiff dough are filled with a sweet mixture, which may contain brown sugar, honey, chopped peanuts, walnuts, and cinnamon. The filled dough is then placed on a greased griddle, and pressed flat into a large circle; this is done with a stainless steel circle and wooden handle as it cooks.

In South Korea, ready-made dry hotteok mix is commercially available in plastic packages. The mix also comes with a filling consisting of brown sugar and ground peanuts or sesame seeds.

== History ==
Hotteok is also closely related to the Silk Road as foods related to wheat flour originated. It is generally believed that the merchants from China who immigrated to and settled down in Korea around the late 19th century made and sold hotteok at cheap prices, which helped spread the dish throughout Korea. It is said that Chinese merchants who entered Korea during the Imo Incident did not return to their homeland even after their country was destroyed, but opened restaurants and sold food to make a living, and one of them was hotteok.

The Chinese merchants in Korea originally sold numerous different types of Chinese snacks made from dough. These included the tang huoshao (糖火烧), jidanbing (雞蛋餅), tanggao (唐糕), zhimabing (芝麻餠), and xianhuabing (鮮花餅). Koreans lumped all of these together under the name hotteok. When Korea was under Japanese rule, the Japanese called them Shina pan (支那パン; lit. 'China bread').

Unlike other Korean pancakes, which often contain savory meat fillings, hotteok usually have been stuffed with sweet fillings, to suit Koreans' culinary tastes.

== Varieties ==
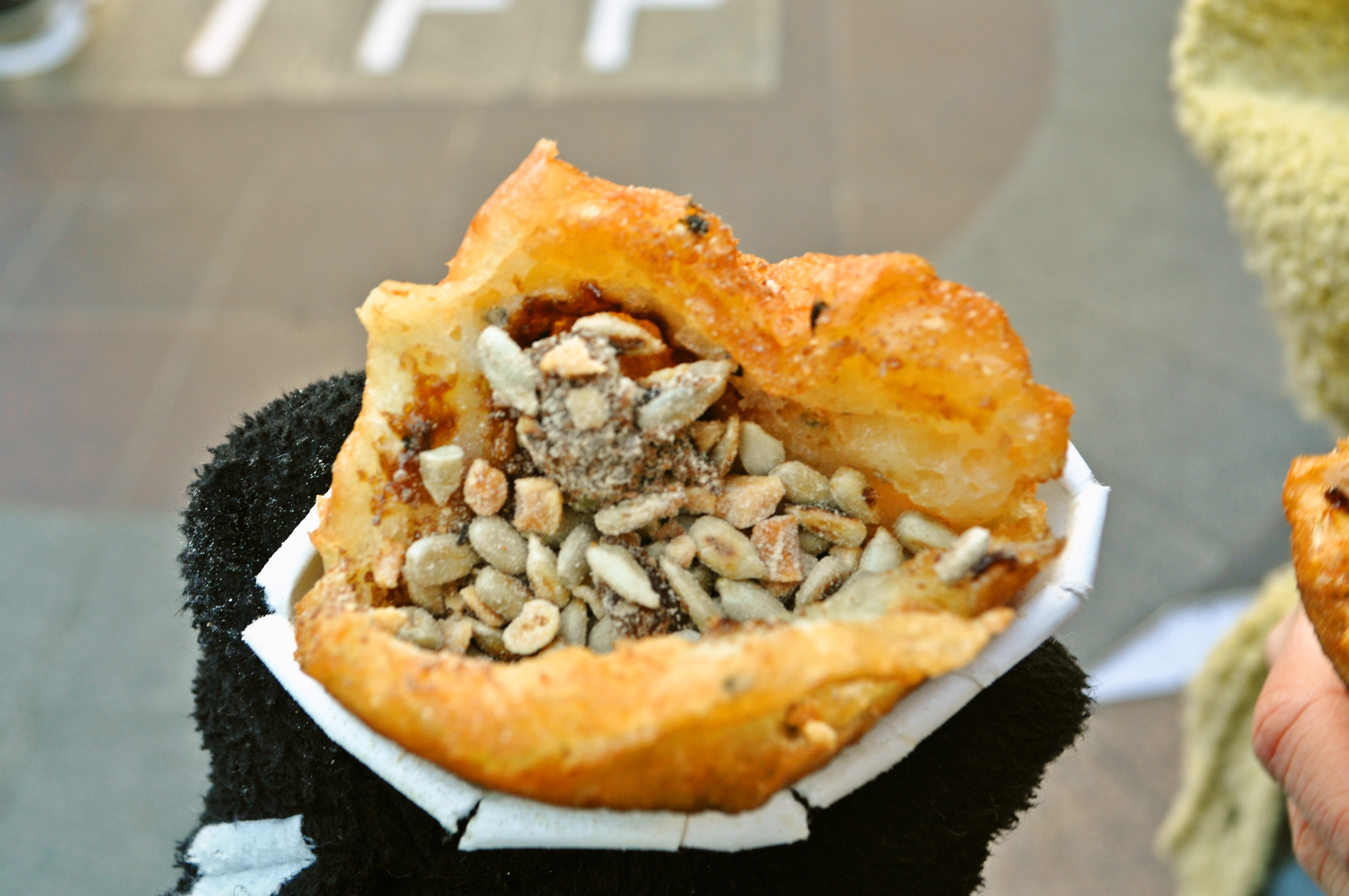
Hotteok filled with a variety of seeds

The types of hotteok have been changing continuously although many favour the traditional cinnamon and peanut filling. Many variations have developed since the early 21st century, such as green tea hotteok, pink bokbunja hotteok, corn hotteok, pizza hotteok and more. Along with that many vendors now sell yachae-hotteok made with japchae and vegetables. Commercially produced hotteok products are developed and sold by companies such as Samyang, Ottogi, and CJ. Such products are designed to be cooked at home.

== Nutrition ==
Hotteok is usually eaten in winter. Due to its high sugar content, a single hotteok may have as many as 230 calories.

== Phrases using hotteok ==
Koreans say "The hotteok store is burning" (호떡집에 불 났다) to refer to noisy situations. It is believed that the phrase originated from the thought of Chinese merchants arguing over the reason of a fire at their hotteok stall.

== See also ==
- Korean Chinese cuisine
- Hobbang
- Bungeoppang
- List of Korean desserts
- Street food in South Korea
- List of pancakes
- List of stuffed dishes
