= Bungeo-ppang =

South Korean stuffed pastry

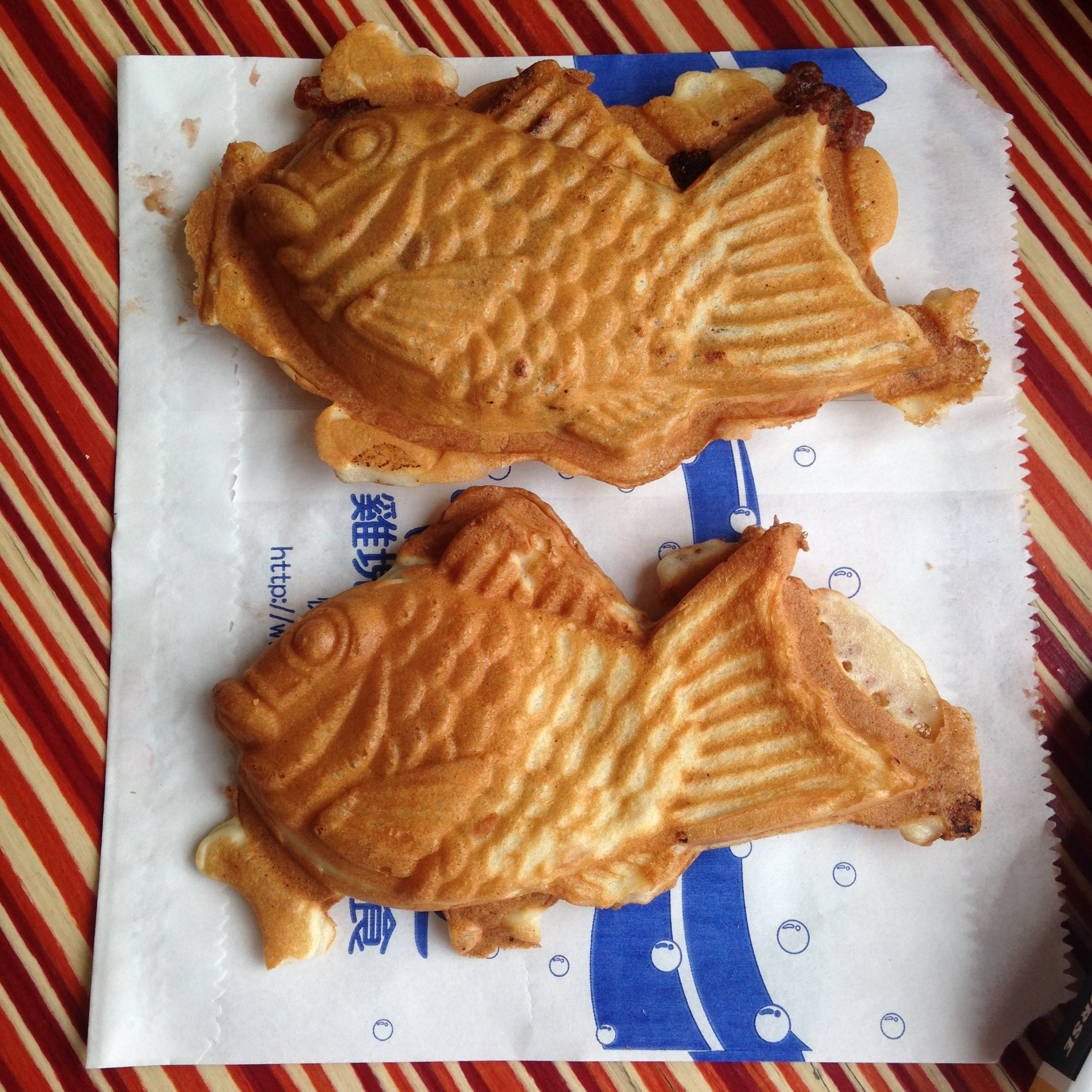
- Bungeo-ppang
- Place of origin: Japan (origin); Korea (adaptation)
- Main ingredients: Wheat flour, red bean paste
- Similar dishes: Taiyaki, gukhwa-ppang

Korean name
- Hangul: 붕어빵
- RR: bungeoppang
- MR: pungŏppang
- IPA: puŋ.ʌ.p͈aŋ

Bungeo-ppang (Korean: 붕어빵; lit. 'carp bread') is a fish-shaped pastry stuffed with sweetened red bean paste, which originated from the Japanese taiyaki. One of South Korea's most popular winter street foods, the snack is often sold at street stalls, grilled on an appliance similar to a waffle iron but with a fish-shaped mold. Red bean paste is the standard filling but many bungeo-ppang sold as street food are filled with pastry cream (called "choux-bung" as the cream is called "choux-cream" in South Korea), sweet potato, pizza toppings, chocolate, kimchi and others. Usually, it costs about 1,000 won (KRW) for two standard-sized bungeo-ppang.

== Etymology ==
The word bungeo-ppang is a compound of "Korean Crucian carp (bungeo)" and "bread (ppang)". The pastry, however, contains no ingredients from its namesake fish or any other fish; rather, the name comes from the shape of the pastry.

== History ==
Bungeo-ppang was derived from the Japanese treat, taiyaki (baked sea bream), introduced to Korea around the 1930s when the country was under Japanese rule. According to the 2011 book Bungeoppang Has a Family Tree, bungeo-ppang began as a mix of Western waffles and Eastern dumplings, as the taiyaki itself was a Japanese adaptation of Western waffles introduced to Japan in the 18th century. The change of fish-shaped pastry continued, as the sea bream-shaped taiyaki became carp-shaped bungeo-ppang in Korea. Although bungeo-ppang's popularity did not last long, it found its way back into popularity during the 1990s with the retro craze in South Korea.

Recently, bungeo-ppang has been seeing higher demand, so to provide information on remaining stalls, enthusiasts nationwide created a "bungeo-ppang map." Through Google Maps, users mark the stalls' locations with brief reviews, prices and opening hours to share with others.

== Preparation ==
Bungeo-ppang batter is made of wheat flour, baking powder, water and/or milk, and optionally eggs. The batter is poured into a fish-shaped mold in the bungeo-ppang grill, an appliance similar to a waffle iron. Sweetened red bean paste with bits of broken beans and bean husk is added. Then, more batter is poured to encase the paste. The mold is then closed to grill the pastry until it is golden and crispy.

== Gallery ==
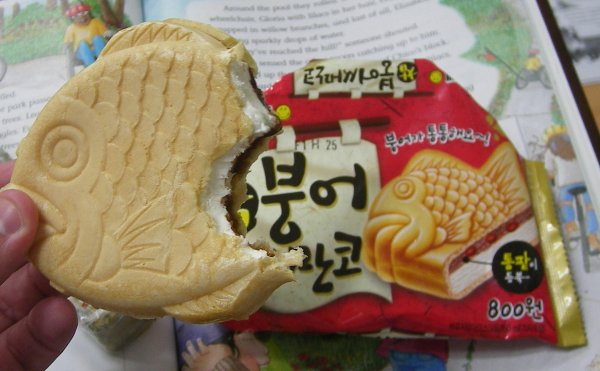
Binggrae's Ssamanko, a bungeo-ppang filled with red bean paste and vanilla ice cream

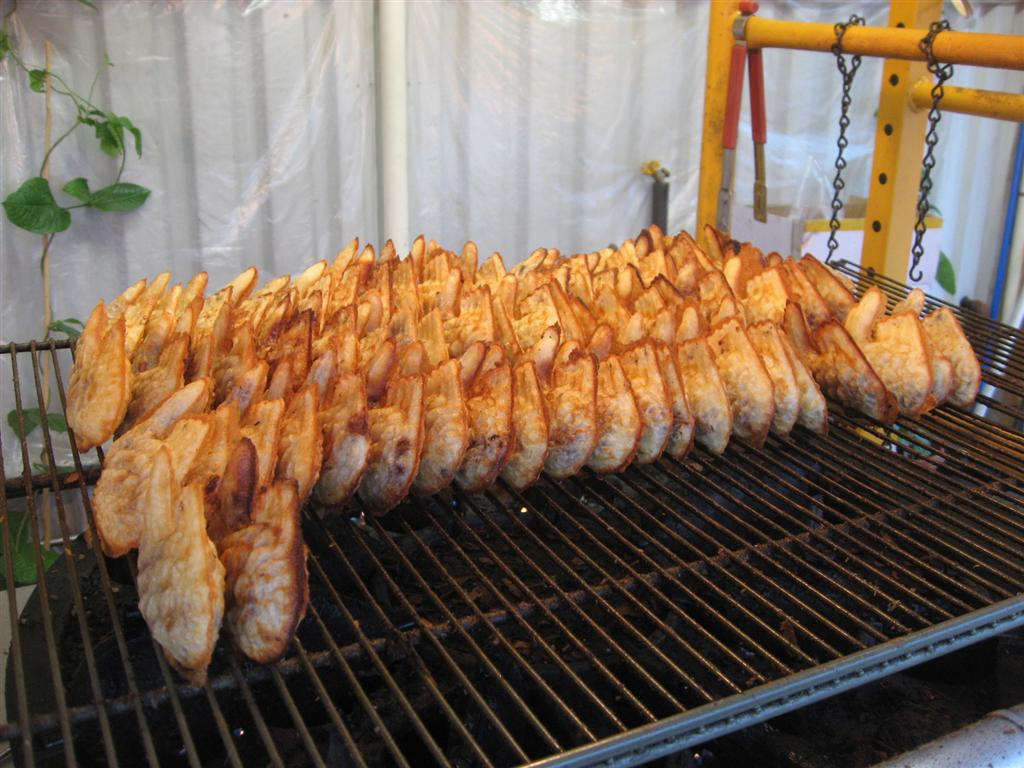
Bungeo-ppang being sold in Toronto, Canada

== See also ==
- Gyeran-ppang
- Hoppang
- Hotteok
- Hodu-gwaja
- Delimanjoo
- List of Korean desserts
- Street food in South Korea
