= Gukhwa-ppang =

Korean red bean pastry

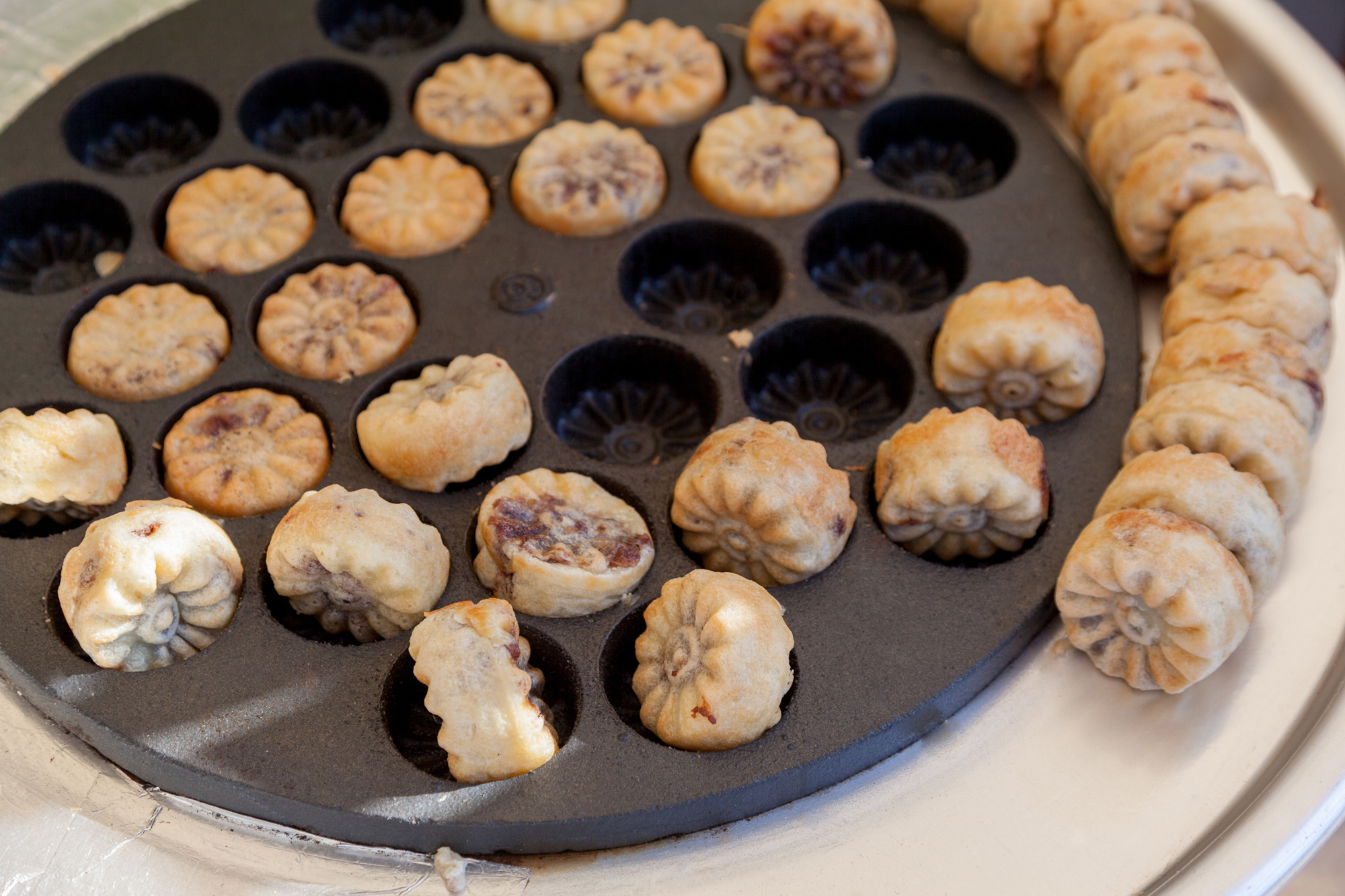
- Alternative names: Chrysanthemum bread
- Place of origin: Korea
- Associated cuisine: Korean cuisine
- Serving temperature: Warm
- Main ingredients: Wheat flour, red bean paste
- Similar dishes: Bungeo-ppang

Korean name
- Hangul: 국화빵
- Hanja: 菊花빵
- RR: gukhwappang
- MR: kukhwappang
- IPA: [ku.kʰwa.p͈aŋ]

Gukhwa-ppang (Korean: 국화빵; lit. chrysanthemum bread) is a flower-shaped pastry stuffed with sweetened red bean paste. It is a warm street food sold throughout Korea. It is grilled in an appliance similar to a waffle iron, but with flower-shaped molds.

== See also ==
- Bungeo-ppang
- Gyeran-ppang
- List of pastries
