= Taiyaki =

Japanese fish-shaped cake

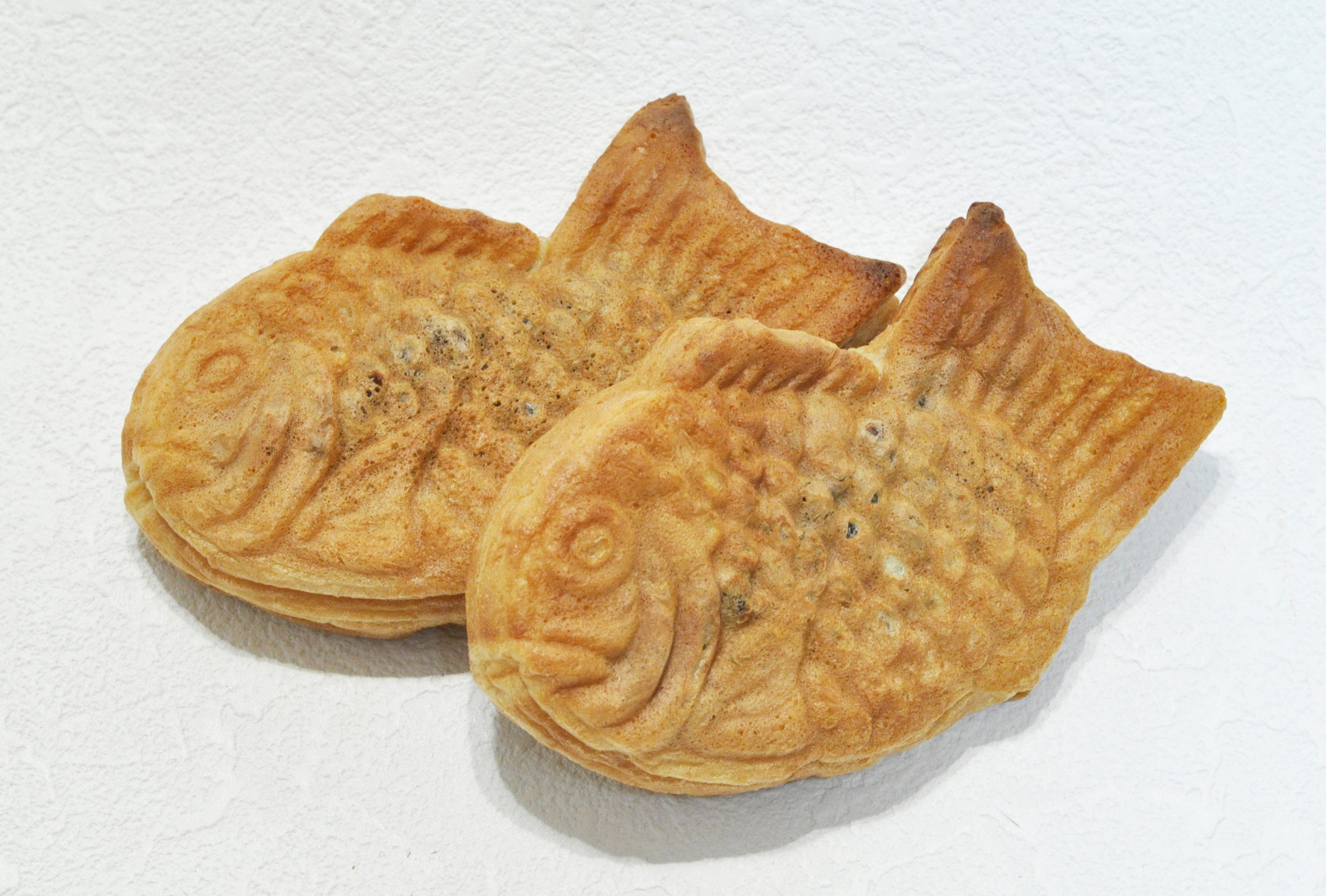
- Two taiyaki
- Course: Snack
- Place of origin: Japan
- Region or state: Honshu
- Main ingredients: Batter, sweetened adzuki beans

Taiyaki (鯛焼き, lit. 'baked sea bream') is a Japanese fish-shaped cake, commonly sold as street food. It imitates the shape of tai (鯛, red sea bream), which it is named after. The most common filling is anko. Some shops even sell taiyaki with okonomiyaki, gyoza filling, or a sausage inside. Smaller, differently shaped versions called kingyoyaki (金魚焼き, lit. 'baked goldfish') are also available and often sold in bags of five, ten, or more.

Taiyaki is similar to imagawayaki, which is a thick round cake, also filled with sweet adzuki bean paste or custard.

== Ingredients ==
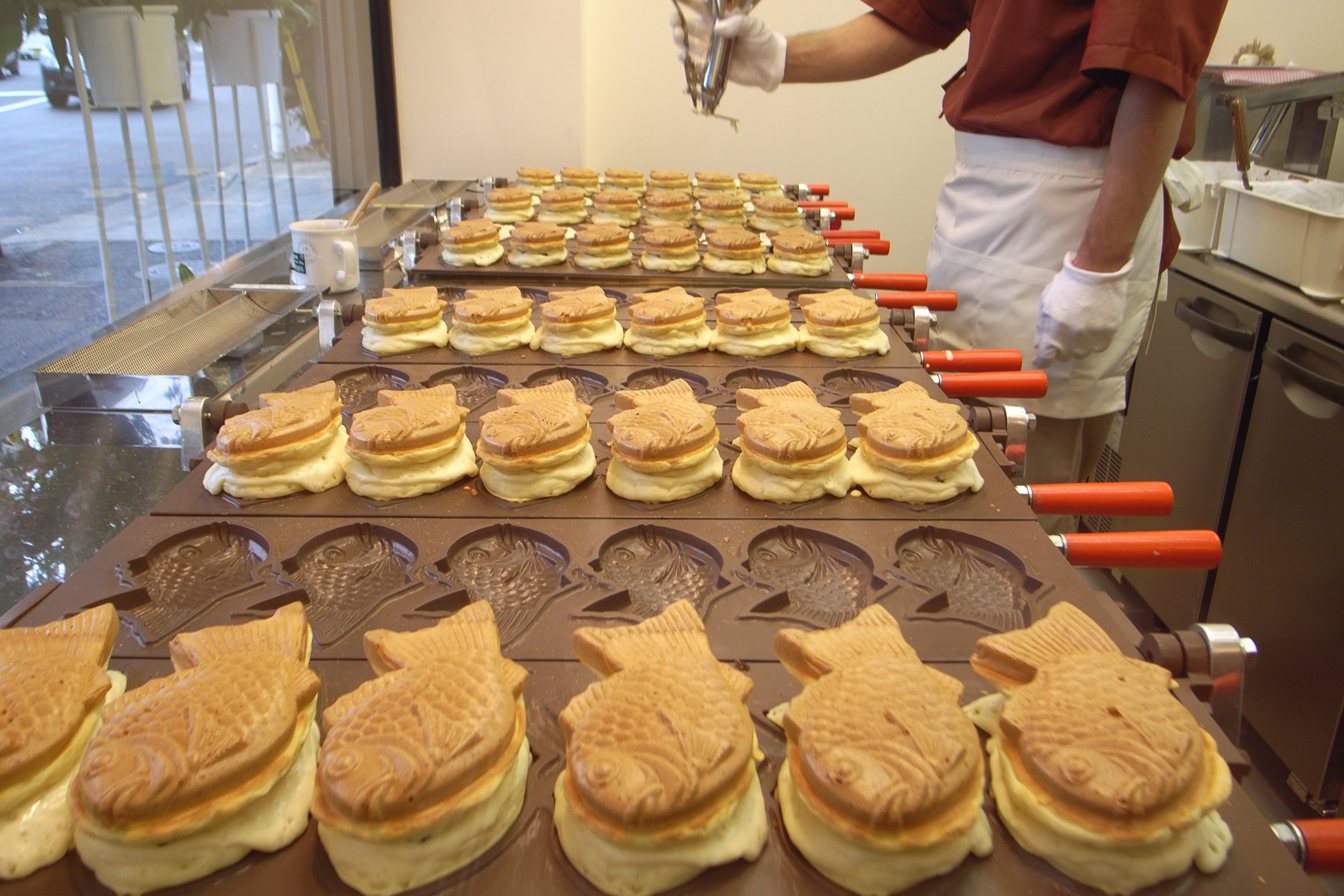
Taiyaki being made on a griddle with fish-shaped molds

Taiyaki is made using regular pancake or waffle batter. The batter is poured into a fish-shaped mold for each side. The filling is then put on one side and the mold is closed. It is then cooked on both sides until golden brown.

== History ==
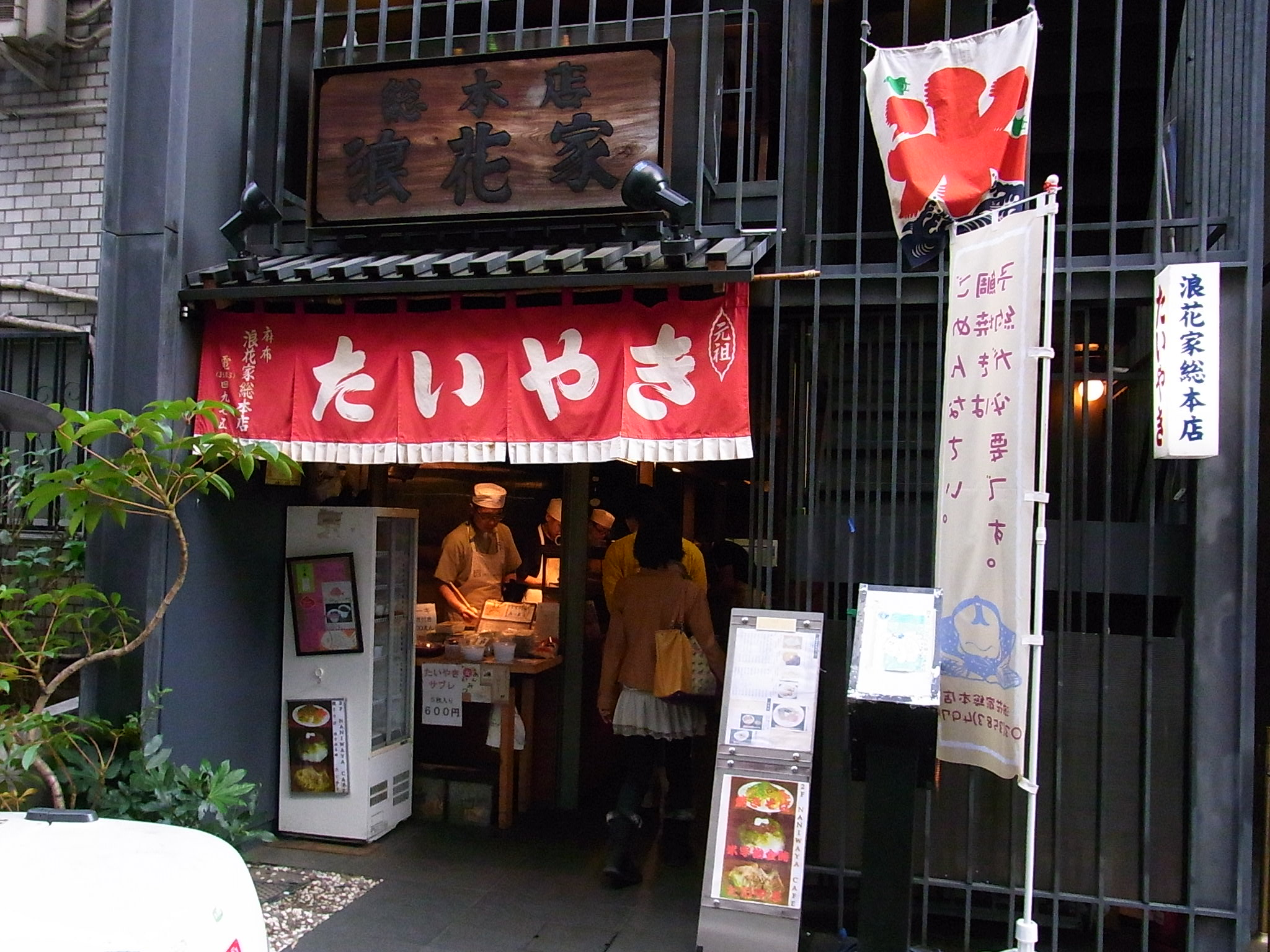
Storefront of Naniwaya Sōhonten (浪花家総本店), where taiyaki was invented

Taiyaki was first sold in Japan in 1909. It is essentially a reshaped form of imagawayaki, an already popular snack made by wrapping bean paste in flour skin.

Seijirō Kobe, founder of the store Naniwaya Sōhonten (浪花家総本店), was having trouble selling his imagawayaki, so he decided to bake the cakes into fish shapes resembling tai, or red sea bream. Tai is considered a symbol of luck and fortune in Japan and was an expensive fish only affordable by the higher classes or on special occasions. Masamori Kobe, the fourth owner of the store, stated that Seijirō wanted to give ordinary people a taste of the expensive fish at low prices.

Since its creation, taiyaki has evolved into many variations, with different ingredients being used for filling and batter, as well as variations in shapes and sizes.

Taiyaki was introduced to Korea during the Japanese colonial period, where it is known as bungeo-ppang.

During the postwar period, taiyaki spread to other Asian countries, as well as the rest of the world.

== Gallery ==
Taiyaki being made, 2014

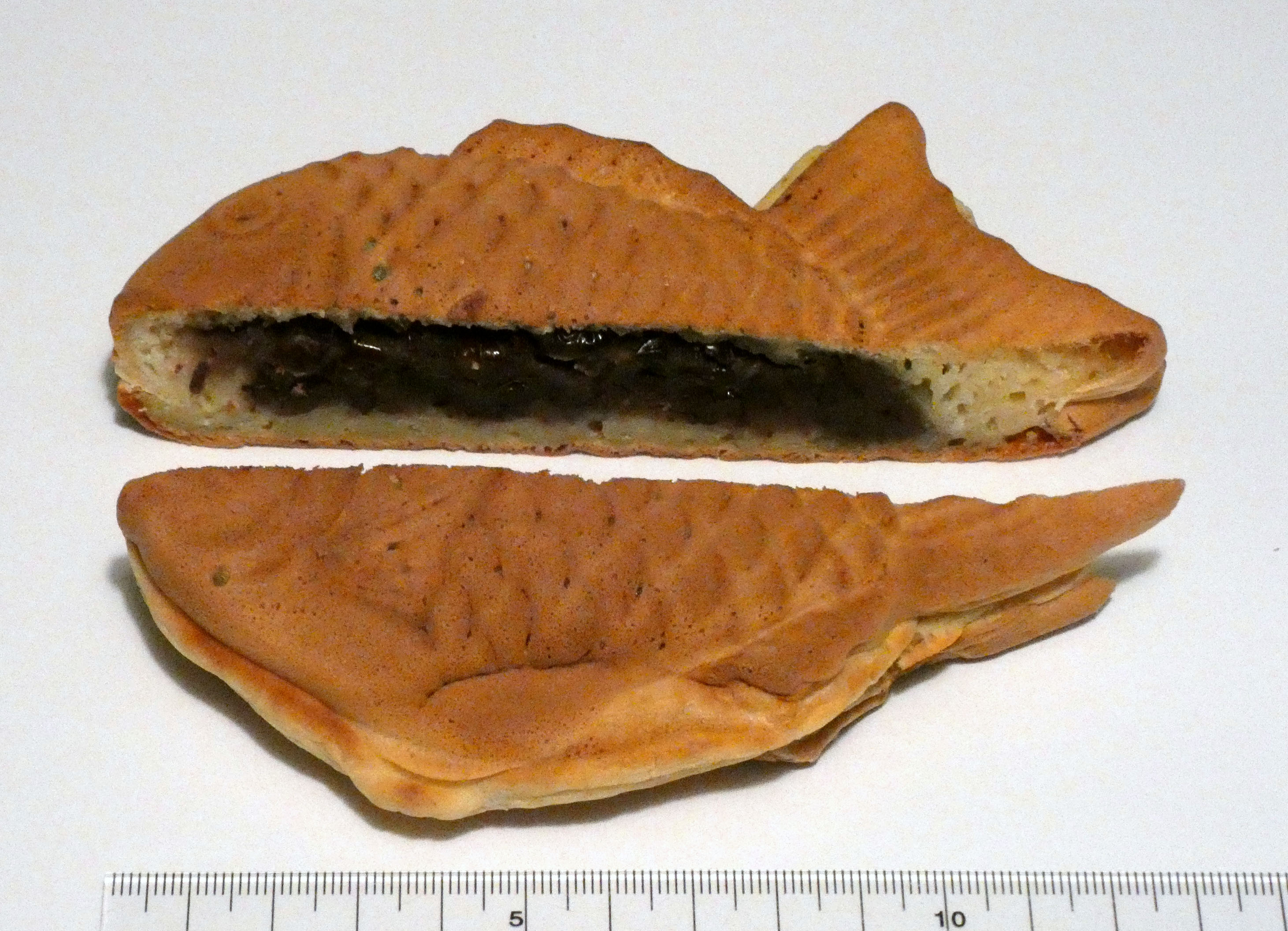
Cut taiyaki, showing the azuki bean filling

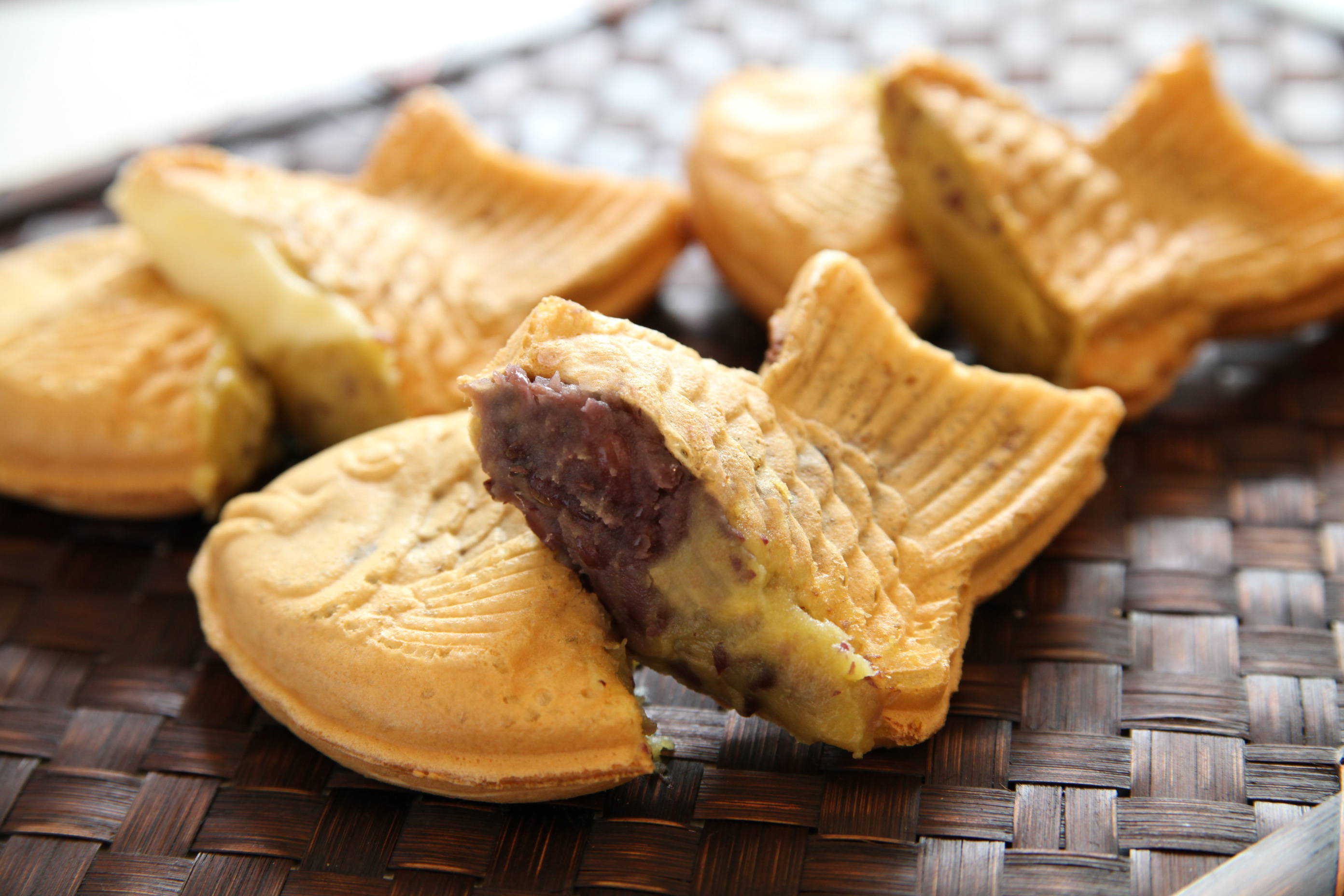
Taiyaki with sweet potato filling

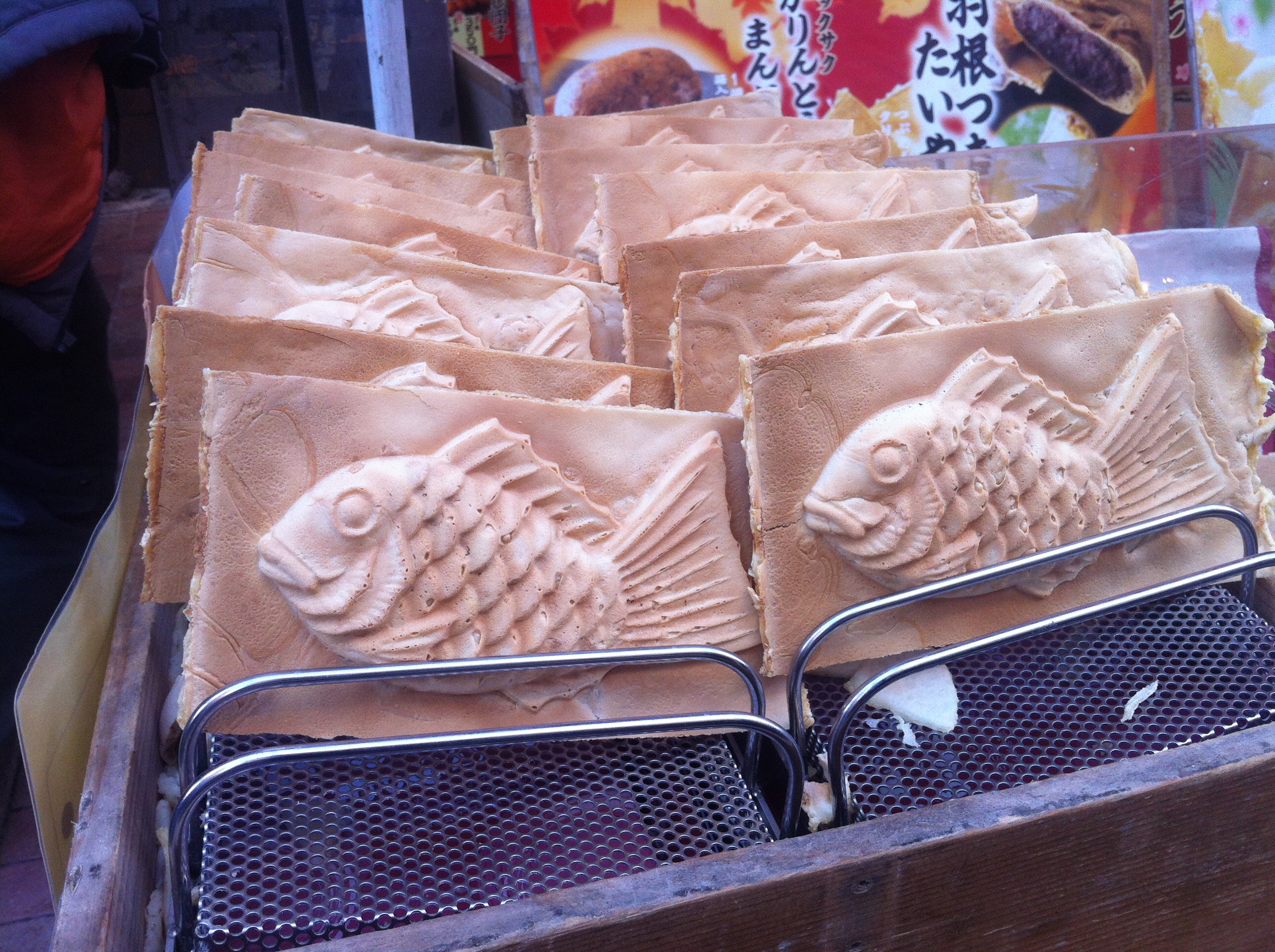
Square taiyaki with uncut edges, sold in Ueno

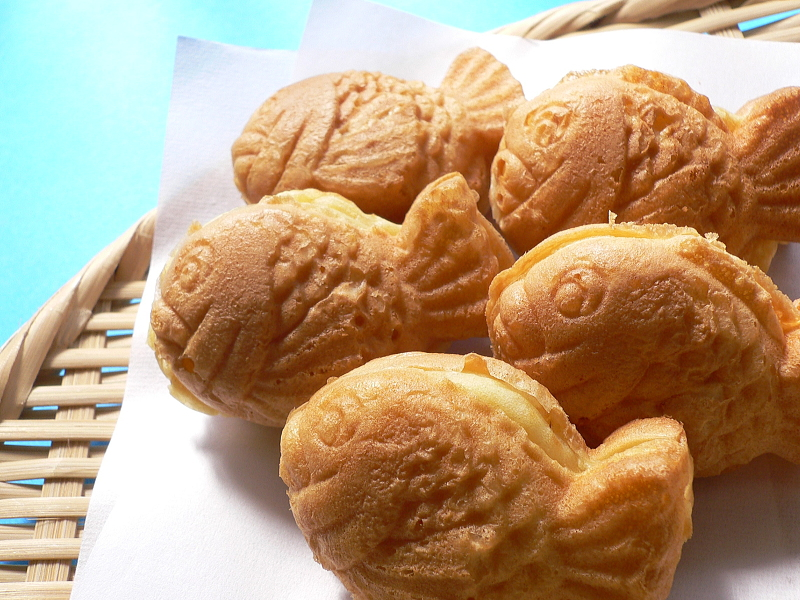
Mini taiyaki

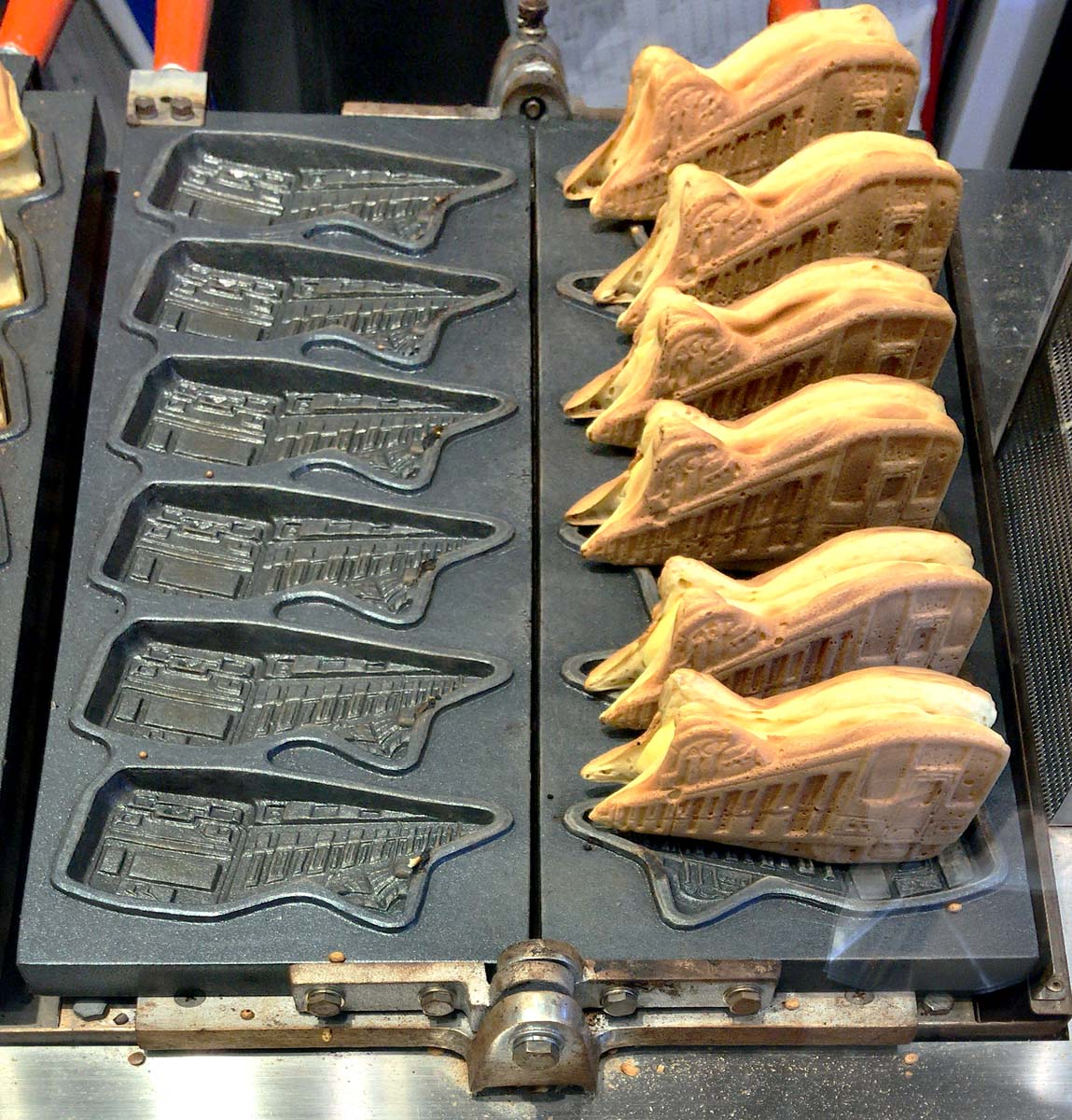
Train-shaped taiyaki, sold outside Narimasu Station

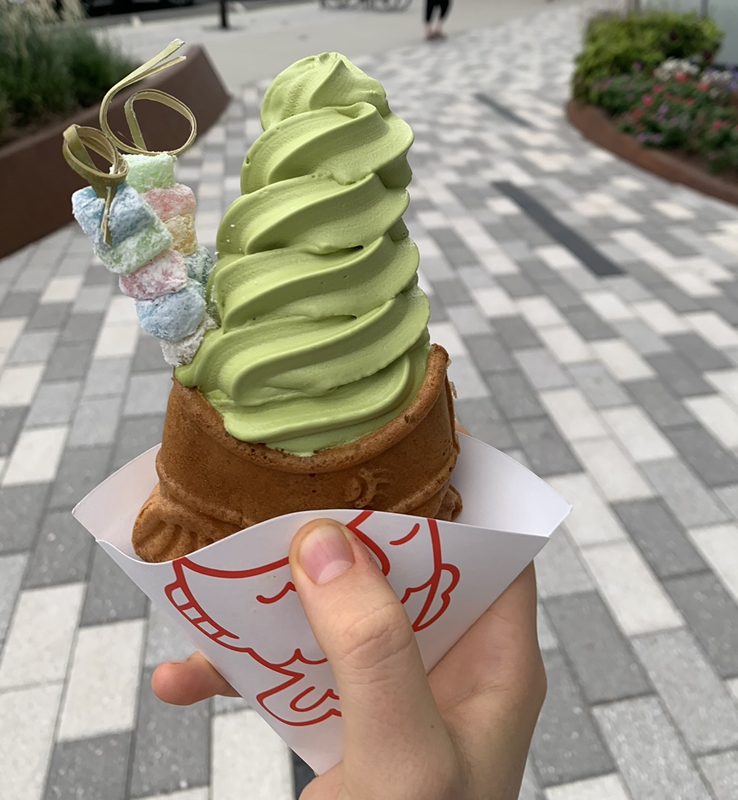
Taiyaki filled with matcha ice cream

== See also ==
- Bungeo-ppang, a similar Korean snack
- "Oyoge! Taiyaki-kun", a song about taiyaki
- Wagashi, Japanese confectionery
