= Gyeran-ppang =

South Korean egg bread snack

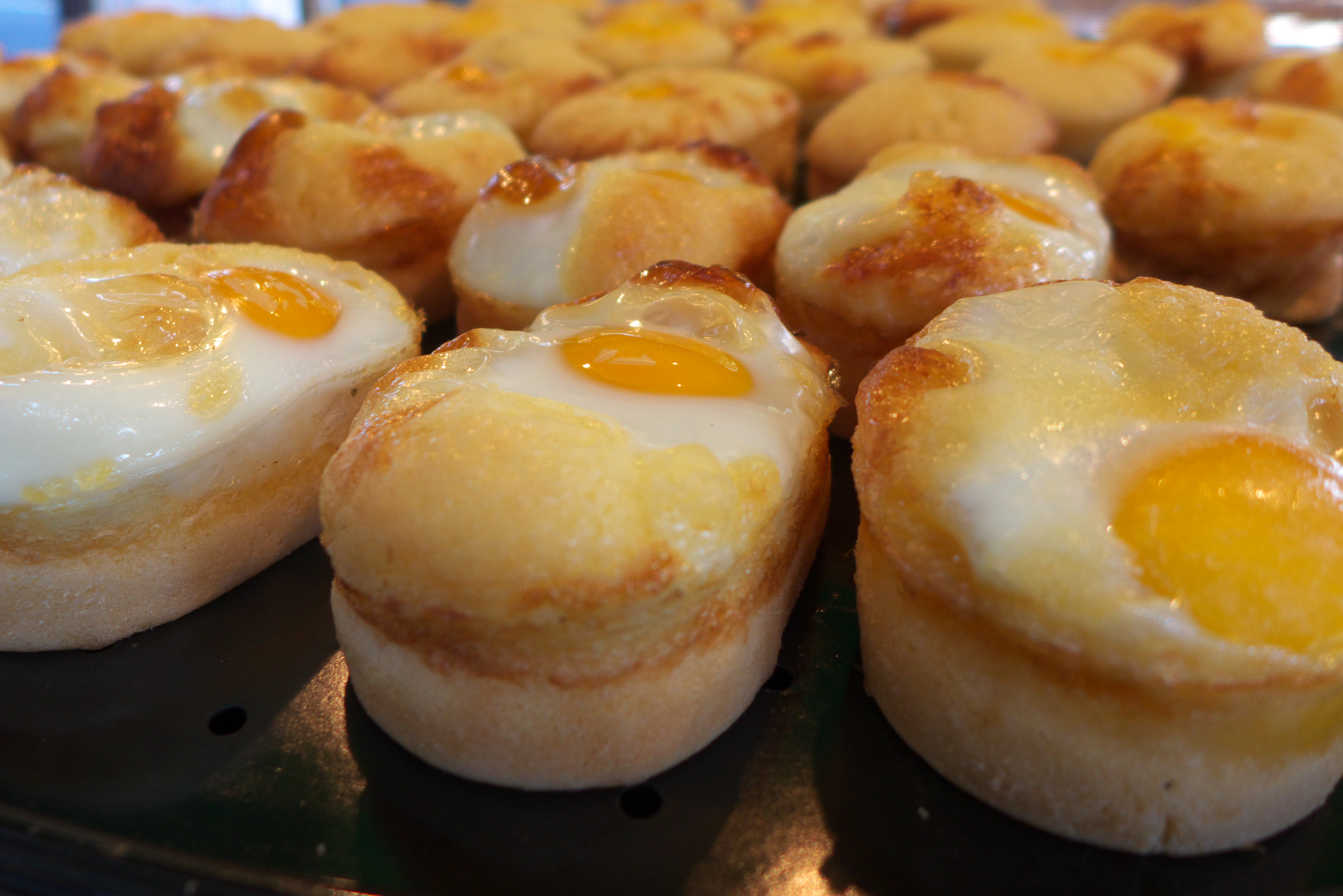
- Place of origin: Korea
- Associated cuisine: Korean cuisine
- Serving temperature: Warm
- Main ingredients: Wheat flour, eggs

Korean name
- Hangul: 계란빵
- Hanja: 鷄卵빵
- RR: gyeranppang
- MR: kyeranppang
- IPA: [kje.ɾan.p͈aŋ]

Gyeran-ppang (Korean: 계란빵; lit. 'egg bread') is a South Korean street food. It is a fluffy, oblong-shaped piece of bread that is sweet and savory with a whole egg inside the pancake dough.

== Preparation ==
A gyeran-ppang machine is an appliance with a few dozen oblong slots for pouring cake batter and eggs. The cake mix usually consists of wheat flour, baking powder, milk, eggs, butter, sugar, salt, and vanilla extract. A whole egg is cracked onto the batter in each slot, and the egg breads are cooked until golden brown. Common toppings include chopped parsley, cheese, and diced ham.

== History ==
Gyeran-ppang was first made at the back gate of Inha University in 1984.

== Gallery ==
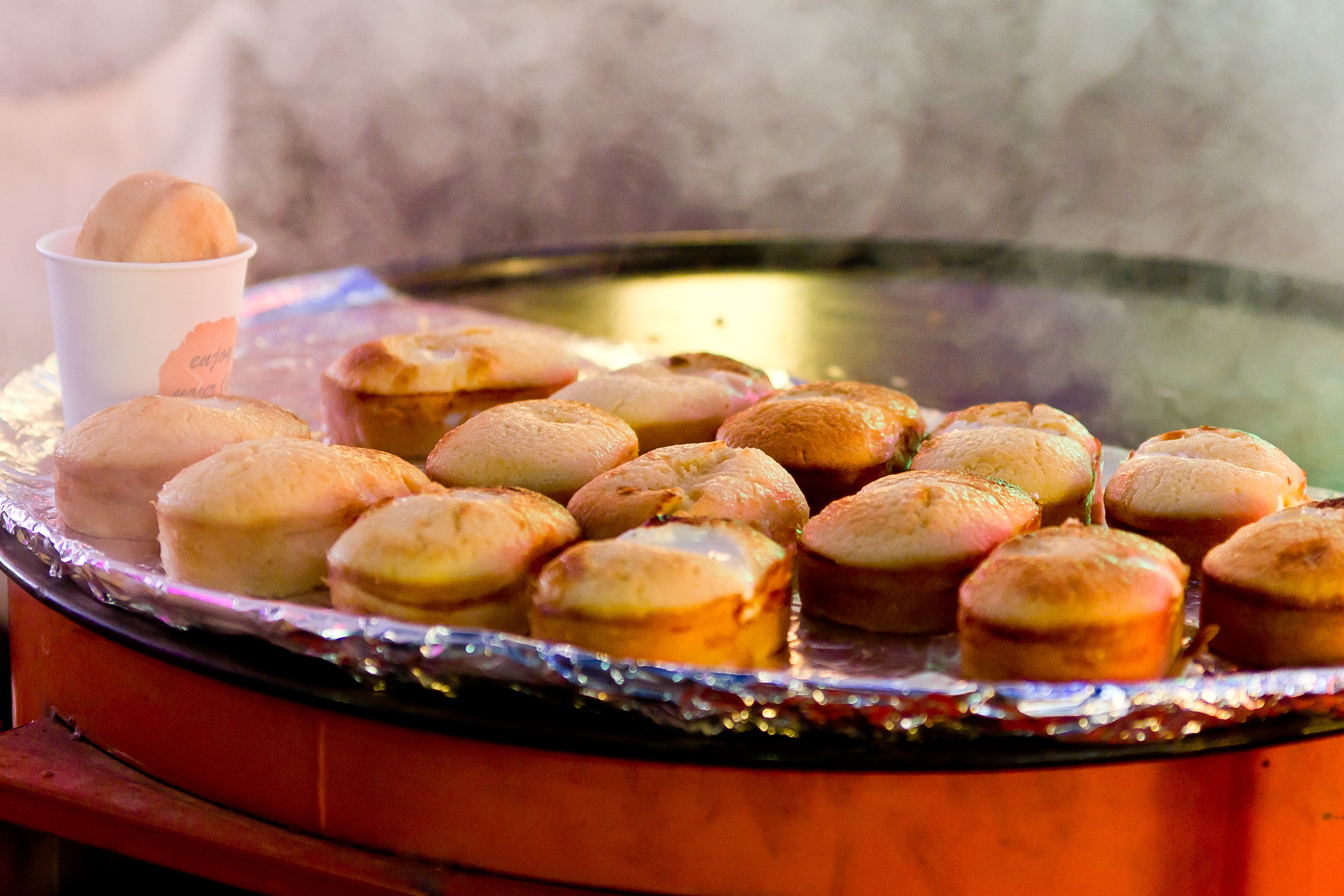
Gyeran-ppang sold as street food in Seoul

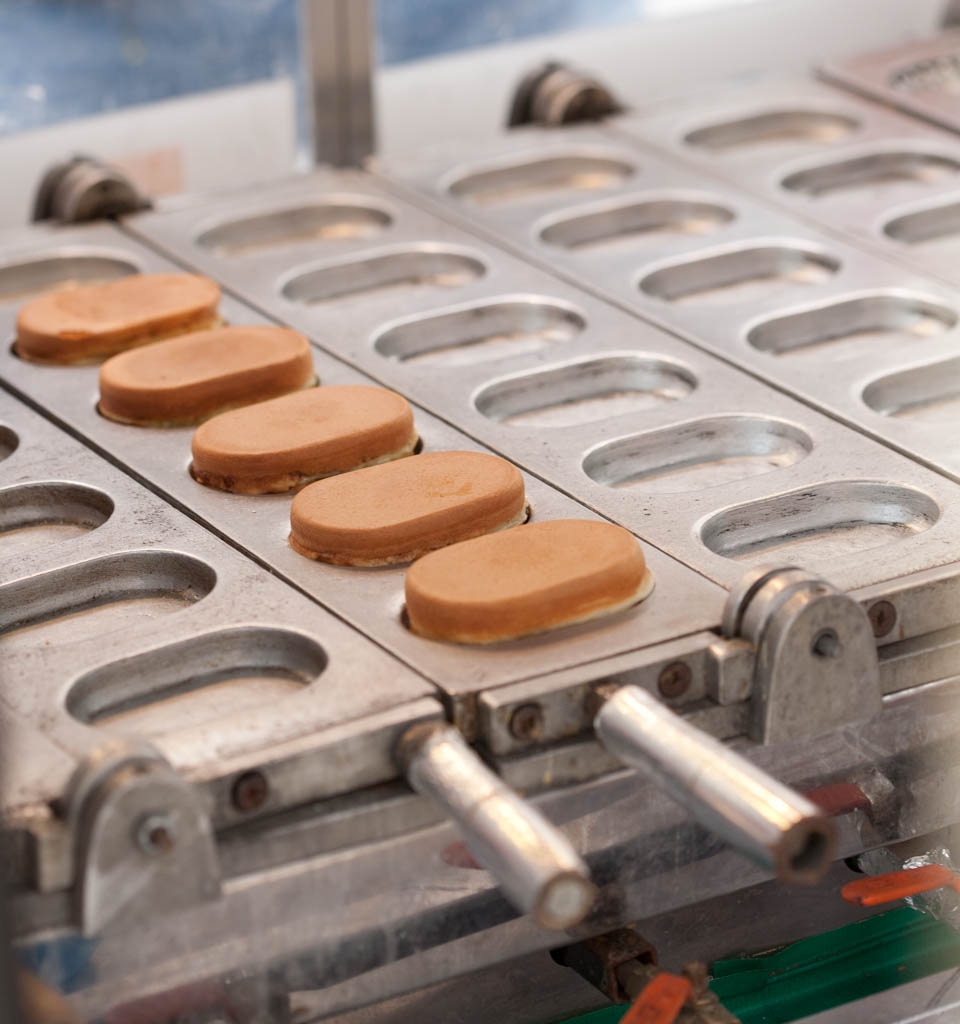
Gyeran-ppang preparation

== See also ==
- List of egg dishes
- List of Korean dishes
