= List of street foods =

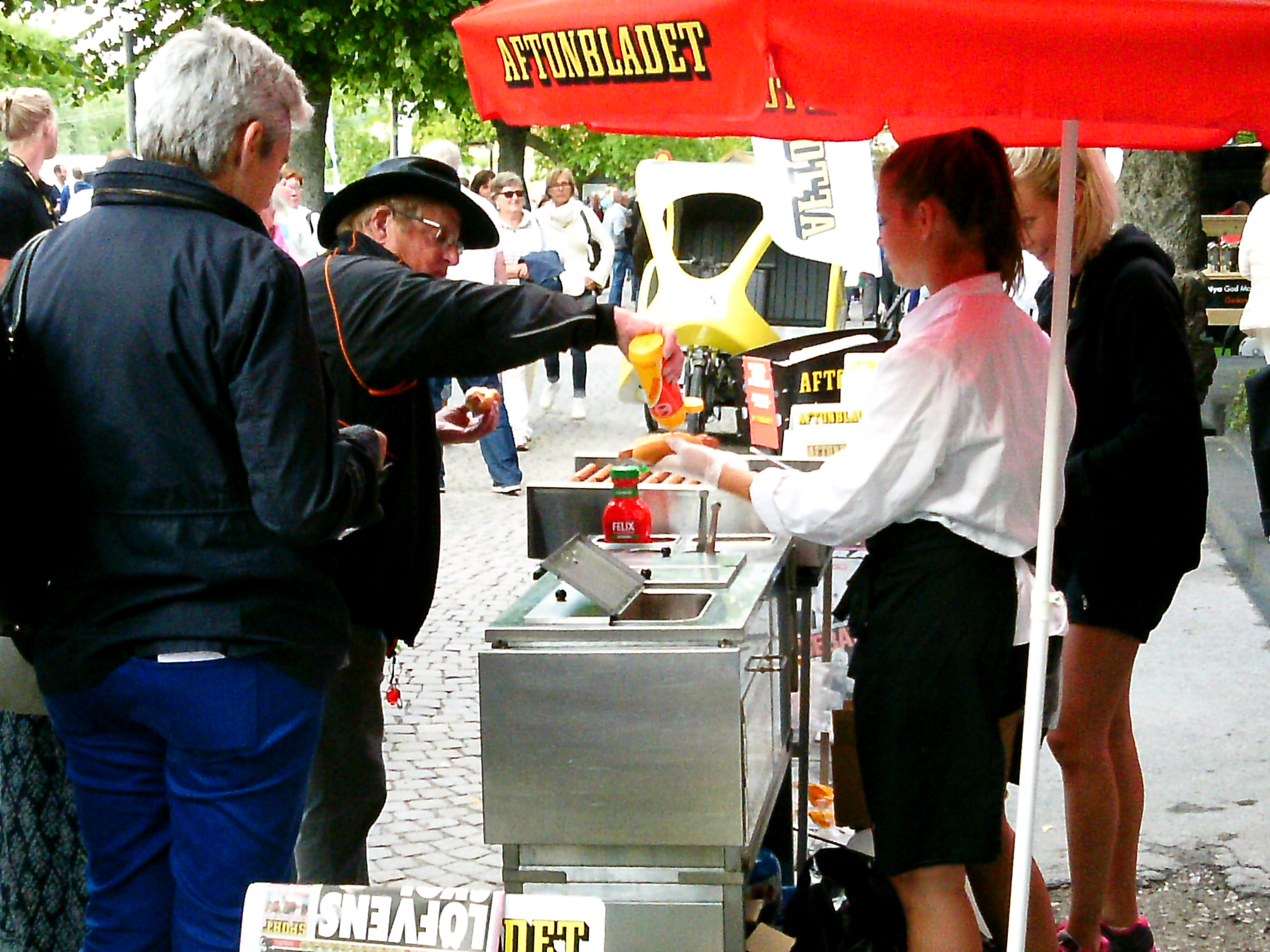
Street food: a hot dog stand in Visby, Sweden

This is a list of street foods. Street food is ready-to-eat food or drink typically sold by a vendor on a street and in other public places, such as at a market or fair. It is often sold from a portable food booth, food cart, or food truck and meant for immediate consumption. Some street foods are regional, but many have spread beyond their region of origin. Street food vending is found all around the world, but varies greatly between regions and cultures.

Most street foods are classed as both finger food and fast food, and are cheaper on average than restaurant meals. According to a 2007 study from the Food and Agriculture Organization, 2.5 billion people eat street food every day.

== Street foods ==
Image	Name	Associated regions	Description
10 won bread	10 won bread	South Korea	South Korean street food that was first sold in Gyeongju in 2019. It is a bread or waffle in the shape of a South Korean 10 won coin that contains stretchy mozzarella cheese.
Acarajé	Acara	Yorubaland; Brazil	Peeled beans formed into a ball and then deep-fried in dendê (palm oil)
Aloo chat	Aloo chaat	India (Northern)	Prepared by frying potatoes in oil and adding spices and chutney
Aloo tikki, served with chutneys	Aloo tikki	India (Northern)	A snack made out of boiled potatoes, onions and various spices
Anticucho	Anticucho	South America	Small pieces of meat (traditionally beef heart) that are marinated in vinegar and spices, grilled, and served on a stick. Anticucho originated in Peru and is now common throughout South America. It is sold in food stalls named anticucheras.
	Arancini	Italy (Sicily)	Stuffed rice balls coated with bread crumbs and then deep fried; they are usually filled with ragù (meat and tomato sauce), mozzarella, and peas
	Arepa	Venezuela, Colombia	A flat, round, unleavened patty of soaked, ground kernels of maize (or maize meal or flour) that can be grilled, baked, fried, boiled or steamed
Asinan	Asinan	Indonesia	A vegetable or fruit dish that is pickled with brine or vinegar
Bagel	Bagel	Poland (Jewish communities originally), then New York City and other locations	A ring-shaped bread roll made with dough that is boiled in water for a short time and then baked; the result is a dense, chewy interior with a browned and sometimes crisp exterior
Bakso	Bakso	Indonesia	A soup with meatballs, noodles, and other ingredients; the meatballs are commonly made from finely ground beef with a small quantity of tapioca flour and salt, however bakso can also be made from other ingredients, such as chicken, pork, fish or shrimp
Banana cue	Banana cue	Philippines	Deep-fried bananas coated in caramelized brown sugar; after cooking they are served on skewers
Bánh canh	Bánh canh	Vietnam	A thick noodle that can be made from tapioca flour or a mixture of rice and tapioca flour, (Note: "Her mother would cook Vietnamese food because that was what she was taught in Saigon: Bánh hói, Bánh canh, fish soup and rice-paper rolls with hot Thai basil and mint."Alice Pung.) (Note: "The Hmong name for them is khaub piaj; the Vietnamese name is bánh canh. These delightfully chewy noodles thicken the soup a little and they soak up a lot of liquid when cooked, so make plenty of broth.") it is used in several dishes.
Bánh hỏi	Bánh hỏi	Vietnam	A dish consisting of rice vermicelli woven into intricate bundles and often topped with chopped scallions or garlic chives sauteed in oil, served with a complementary meat dish.
Bánh mì	Bánh mì	Vietnam	A type of meat-filled sandwich on bánh mì bread; the bread is similar to a baguette but airier and with a thinner crust; various fillings are used, most commonly some kind of pork or chicken
Bánh xèo	Bánh xèo	Vietnam	A savory fried pancake made of rice flour, water, and turmeric powder, stuffed with slivers of fatty pork, shrimp, diced green onion, and bean sprouts
	Bắp xào	Vietnam	A stir-fried maize (corn) with butter and addition with green onion, dried shrimp, Shacha sauce, etc.
Baozi	Baozi	China and Southeast/East Asia	Baozi originates from China and can be found in many Asian countries. The dough, made from flour, water, and yeast, is steamed, not baked. Baozi may contain different types of fillings. If unfilled, it is often served as a staple food to side dishes.
Batagor	Batagor	Indonesia	Fried fish dumplings, usually served with peanut sauce. "Batagor" is an abbreviation of bakso tahu goreng (which literally means fried tofu and meatballs); it's a variant of siomay in which the dumpling is deep-fried instead of steamed.
Batata vada	Batata vada	India (Maharashtra)	A mashed potato patty coated with chickpea flour, then deep-fried and served hot with chutney; a thick sphere, around two or three inches in diameter
Belgian waffle	Belgian waffle	Belgium, United States	In North America, the Belgian waffle is a variety of waffle with a lighter batter, larger squares, and deeper pockets than ordinary American waffles. In Belgium itself, there are several kinds of waffle, including the Brussels waffle and the Liège waffle, none of them called "Belgian".
Beondegi	Beondegi	South Korea	Steamed or boiled silkworm larvae which are seasoned and eaten as a snack (Note: "Beondegi are silkworm pupae boiled or steamed, served in cups, and skewered with toothpicks")
Bhelpuri	Bhelpuri	India	A savoury snack, bhelpuri is a type of chaat made from puffed rice, vegetables and a tangy tamarind sauce.
Bibingka	Bibingka	Philippines	Rice cake prepared in clay pot on the streets of the Philippines. They are often topped with butter, muscovado sugar, desiccated coconut, grated cheese and salted duck egg.
Bourekas	Boureka	Middle East and Balkans	Baked puff pastry dough or filo dough with any of various fillings such as cheese, spinach, or potatoes
Bramborák	Bramborák	Czech Republic	Czech potato pancake is called bramborák (from brambor, potato) and it is made of grated potatoes with egg, breadcrumbs or flour and seasoning (salt, pepper, most importantly garlic and marjoram; sometimes ground, cracked or whole caraway seeds) and is served as it is.
Bratwurst	Bratwurst	Germany	A sausage typically made with pork and veal, and usually seasoned with ginger, nutmeg, coriander, or caraway; recipes for the sausage vary by region
Bread pakora stuffed with mashed potatoes	Bread pakora	India	A fried snack made with bread slices, gram flour, and spices; sometimes it is stuffed with mashed potatoes
Breakfast burrito	Breakfast burrito	United States (Southwestern)	Breakfast items such as scrambled eggs, fried potatoes, and cheese, wrapped inside a flour tortilla; invented in Santa Fe, New Mexico
Brochette	Brochette	France and elsewhere	Various meats and vegetables cooked, and sometimes served, on brochettes, or skewers
Bublik	Bublik or baranka	Ukraine, Russia, Belarus	A ring-shaped bread roll similar to a bagel, but somewhat larger, denser, and sweeter.
Bubur ayam	Bubur ayam	Indonesia	A porridge of rice and shredded chicken, served with soy sauce, spices, fried shallots, cakwee (fried dough), krupuk (a type of cracker), and sambal (a hot sauce); often eaten for breakfast
Bun cha	Bun cha	Vietnam	Grilled fatty pork (chả) over a plate of white rice noodles (bún) and herbs with a side dish of dipping sauce
	Bungeo-ppang	South Korea	A fish-shaped pastry stuffed with sweetened red bean paste
Bun kebab	Bun kebab	Pakistan (Karachi and elsewhere)	A fried patty of ground lentils, chicken or beef, egg batter, and spices, served on a bun with chutney on the side
Bunny chow	Bunny chow	South Africa	A hollowed-out loaf of bread filled with curry
Burrito	Burrito	Mexico, United States	Consists of a wheat flour tortilla wrapped or folded into a cylindrical shape to completely enclose various fillings that are used
Calzone	Calzone	Italy, United States	A turnover of pizza dough stuffed with pizza ingredients such as mozzarella and ricotta cheeses, tomato sauce, and sausage
Camote cue	Camote cue	Philippines	Slices of sweet potato deep fried with a coating of caramelized brown sugar; sometimes served on a bamboo skewer
Carrozza	Carrozza	Italy (Campania)	A type of fried cheese sandwich that is prepared by frying mozzarella cheese between slices of bread
Cendol	Cendol	Malaysia and South/Southeast Asia	An iced dessert concoction made from dark palm sugar syrup, coconut milk, pandan extract and bean flour, topped with azuki beans and a smattering of grass jelly and palm seeds.
Ceviche	Ceviche	Latin America	A marinated fish salad in which raw fish is cured in citrus juice and mixed with onion, chili pepper, and cilantro. Ceviche is considered to be a national dish in Peru.
Chaat	Chaat	India (Northern), Pakistan, and elsewhere in South Asia	A type of savory snack; a mixture of ingredients, it often includes fried dough, potatoes, chickpeas, chutney, and tangy spices
Chai tow kway	Chai tow kway	Singapore	Also known locally as carrot cake, a dish made with rice flour and white radish, wok-fried with garlic, eggs and served in either white or black style based on the preferred type of soy sauce used during seasoning.
Char kway teow	Char kway teow	Singapore and Malaysia	A flat rice noodle dish stir fried over high heat with dark soy sauce, bean spouts, chives, lard, eggs and shellfish.
Chee cheong fun	Chee cheong fun	China, Hong Kong and Southeast Asia	Also known as rice noodle roll, chee cheong fun are white rolls cut from steamed sheets of rice or tapioca flour. Prior to serving, the rolls are seasoned with a dash of soy sauce and dressed with shallots, scallions and sesame seeds.
Chiburekki	Chiburekki	Caucasus, Central Asia, Russia, Ukraine, Turkey	A deep-fried turnover with a filling of ground or minced beef or mutton with onions and spices
Chicharrón	Chicharrón	Latin America, Philippines	Fried pork rinds
Chiko roll	Chiko Roll	Australia	Brand name for a deep-fried food similar to an egg roll, with a thick, chewy dough wrapper stuffed with mutton, barley, cabbage, carrots, celery, rice, and seasonings.
Chimichurris	Chimi de pierna	Dominican Republic	A sandwich of pulled pork leg, sliced cabbage and other ingredients usually chopped on a griddle with custom seasoning. A cheaper variation using processed meat is also common and usually called "chimi burger" or just "chimi".
Chimichanga	Chimichanga	United States (Southwestern)	A deep-fried burrito
Chinese bhel	Chinese bhel	India (Mumbai)	A dish of Indian Chinese cuisine, made with fried noodles, sautéed vegetables, onions, and spices.
Chivito	Chivito	Uruguay	A large sandwich of churrasco (grilled, thinly sliced filet mignon) on a roll, with mozzarella, lettuce, tomatoes, mayonnaise, and other ingredients such as bacon, ham, and eggs
Chongqing noodles	Chongqing noodles	China (Chongqing)	A variety of wheat noodle dishes served in a spicy sauce with meat and vegetables, traditionally eaten for breakfast
Choripán	Choripán	Argentina	A sausage of beef or pork, grilled, split lengthwise, and served on a roll with various condiments; the name is a combination of the words chorizo (sausage) and pan (bread)
Lamb chuan	Chuan	China	Small pieces of meat on skewers roasted over charcoal or deep frying in oil. Chuan was traditionally made from lamb but chicken, pork, beef, and various types of seafood can also be used.
Grilled corn	Grilled corn	Southeast Asia	Corn on the cob, grilled with coconut milk, sugar, and pandan leaf
Corn dog	Corn dog	United States	A hot dog on a stick, coated with cornmeal batter and deep fried.
Covrigi	Covrigi	Romania	A covrig is a baked, twisted piece of dough similar to a pretzel; it is usually topped with sesame seeds, poppy seeds, and/or salt
Coxinha	Coxinha	Brazil	Chopped or shredded chicken meat covered in dough, molded into a shape resembling a chicken leg, battered, and fried
Crêpes	Crêpe	France	A type of very thin pancake. Crêpes are a very common street food in Paris, France.
	Cup-bap	South Korea	A food truck offering that consists of bap (rice) in a paper or plastic cup with a variety of toppings.
Epok-Epok	Curry puff	Southeast Asia	Turnover with a pastry shell and filling of potatoes or sardines, onions, curry powder and spices.
Currywurst	Currywurst (Note: "Iconic buildings define cityscapes, but street food defines cities. Hot pretzels in Manhattan, currywurst in Berlin, funnel cake in Boston. Local aromas wafting through the iron grids of a city imbue the memory better than a snapshot.")	Germany	A fried pork sausage topped with curry ketchup and curry powder, served either whole or cut up, sometimes with French fries on the side
Dahi puri	Dahi puri	India (Maharashtra)	A type of chaat made with puri (an unleavened deep-fried bread), chickpeas or potatoes, chili powder, and chutney
Dak-kkochi	Dak-kkochi	South Korea	Grilled chicken skewers. The meat is first cooked and cut into narrow slices, then it is coated with barbecue-flavor spices. Mayonnaise and mustard may also be used as toppings.
	Dalgona	South Korea	A Korean sweet candy made from melted sugar and baking soda.
Danger dog	Danger dog	Mexico	A hot dog wrapped in bacon, either deep-fried or grilled, often sold by unlicensed vendors.
Dim sum	Dim sum	China	Small bite-sized portions of food served in small steamer baskets or on small plates
Doner kebab	Doner kebab (Note: "A list of the most famous and widespread street foods would certainly include ice cream, doughnut, doner kebab, fish and chips, hamburger, and hot dog ...")	Turkey, Germany, and elsewhere	Meat (often veal mixed with lamb) cooked on a vertical rotisserie; usually served wrapped in a flatbread with salad and condiments
Donkey burger	Donkey burger	China (Hebei Province)	Chopped or shredded donkey meat or offal served inside a shao bing, a semi-flaky bread pocket, usually with chili peppers and cilantro. Depending on locale, the meat may be served warm or cold
Doubles	Doubles	Trinidad and Tobago/Caribbean with Indian influence	It is a sandwich made with two baras (flat fried bread) filled with curry channa (curried chick peas). Topped with either mango (aam), shadon beni (bandaniya), cucumber (kheera), coconut (naariyal), tomato (damadol), or tamarind (imalee) chutney, or extra pepper sauce. This delicacy is the most popular fast food in Trinidad and Tobago. Doubles are eaten for breakfast, sometimes for lunch, often at night but can be a late night snack, too.
Doughnut	Doughnut	United States and elsewhere	A ring-shaped pastry made with deep-fried flour dough, with frosting, glazing, or a sweet filling
Douhua	Douhua	China, Hong Kong, Taiwan and Southeast Asia	A soft pudding made from tofu; depending on what is added to it, douhua can be either savory or sweet
Dürüm	Dürüm	Turkey, Europe	A wrap that is usually filled with typical döner kebab ingredients or other types of Turkish kebab.
Egg waffle vendor	Egg waffle	Hong Kong	A fluffy waffle made with eggy leavened batter cooked between two plates of semi-spherical cells; usually served plain
Elotes	Elote	Mexico	Corn on the cob, grilled and then coated with condiments such as butter or mayonnaise, salt, chili powder, añejo cheese, and lime juice; sometimes served on a stick
Empanadas	Empanada	Philippines, South America, Spain	A turnover made with pastry dough and any of various savory fillings, usually including some kind of ground or chopped meat; most often it is baked but sometimes it is fried
Enchilada	Enchilada	Mexico	A corn tortilla rolled around a filling and covered with a chili pepper sauce. Enchiladas can be filled with a variety of ingredients.
Espetinhos	Espetinhos	Brazil	Small pieces of beef, chicken, or other meat, grilled on skewers; usually served with hot sauce on the side
Esquites	Esquites	Mexico	Fresh grains of corn are first boiled in salted water, then sautéed in butter with onions, chile peppers, and spices; the result is served hot in small cups and topped with lime juice, chile powder or hot sauce, salt, and mayonnaise
Es Goyang	Es goyang	Indonesia	A dessert, served on a skewer, made with mung bean flour and corn flour. The mixture is boiled, put into a mold to freeze, then dipped into melted chocolate.
Ewa aganyin	Ewa aganyin	Yorubaland (Benin, Nigeria, Togo)	A vegetarian bean stew flavored with bell pepper, onion, ginger, and dried chilis, typically served with bread.
	Falafel	Middle East	Deep-fried balls of ground chickpeas (or sometimes fava beans), often served with salad and tahini sauce in pita or a wrap
Farinata	Farinata	Italy, France	A thin, unleavened pancake or crêpe of chickpea flour originating in Genoa and later a typical food of the Ligurian Sea coast, from Nice to Elba island.
Fish and chips	Fish and chips	United Kingdom and Ireland	Large fillets of batter-fried whitefish served with square-cut or chunky chips (i.e. French fries)
Fish balls	Fish balls	China (Southern) and Southeast Asia	Small, round dumplings made from fish paste (fish that has been made into a paste, either by fermentation or by physical pounding)
Fishball noodles	Fish ball noodles	China, Hong Kong, Taiwan, Singapore and Malaysia	A Chinese noodle dish from Teochew and Fujian provinces, based on the fish-ball and other ingredients, available in dry or soup versions.
Fish taco	Fish taco	Mexico (Baja California and elsewhere)	A taco filled with batter-fried whitefish and other ingredients such as guacamole and salsa
Focaccia	Focaccia	Italy	A flatbread similar in style, composition, and texture to pizza dough, topped with cheese, herbs, and other ingredients
French fries	French fries	Belgium, rest of Europe and the United States	Sliced potatoes that are typically deep fried. The dish can also be baked.
French Tacos	French tacos	France	a fast food dish which usually consists of a flour tortilla grilled and folded around a filling of French fries, cheese, and meat, among other deli ingredients.
Fried chicken	Fried chicken	Thailand	Chicken pieces that are deep-fried with coriander, garlic, fish sauce, pepper, and other spices
Frybread	Frybread	United States (Southwestern)	A flat dough fried or deep-fried in oil, shortening, or lard and generally leavened with baking powder
Funnel cake	Funnel cake	United States	A sweet snack made by pouring batter through a funnel into hot cooking oil in a circular pattern and letting it deep-fry, then sprinkling it with powdered sugar
Galette-saucisse	Galette-saucisse	France (Brittany)	A pork sausage wrapped in a buckwheat pancake
Gelato	Gelato	Italy	A rich dessert imbued with various flavors, the gelato contains less air and more flavoring than other types of frozen desserts like ice cream.
Gimbap	Gimbap	South Korea	Cooked, unseasoned white rice rolled in seaweed (gim) with vegetables and other ingredients like meat, fish, egg, and cheese.
Ginanggang	Ginanggang	Philippines	Pieces of saba banana on a stick, brushed with margarine, sprinkled with sugar, and grilled over charcoal
Gỏi cuốn	Gỏi cuốn	Vietnam	Pork, prawns, vegetables, bún (thin rice noodles), and other ingredients wrapped in bánh tráng (a thin wrapper made from rice flour); similar to spring rolls, gỏi cuốn are sometimes called "summer rolls"
Gorengan	Gorengan	Indonesia	A gorengan is a type of fritter. Many varieties are sold on traveling carts by street vendors. Various kinds of ingredients are battered and deep fried, such as pisang goreng (banana fritter), tempeh, tahu goreng (fried tofu), oncom, sweet potato, cassava chunk, cassava flour, and breadfruit, and these are often eaten accompanied by fresh bird's eye chili.
Grilled cheese sandwich	Grilled cheese sandwich	United States & Canada	A sandwich of melted cheese on toasted bread; many variations exist, but originally it was made by heating buttered bread and slices of American cheese in a skillet
Gukhwappang	Gukhwappang	South Korea	Small pastries that are shaped like chrysanthemum flowers and filled with red bean paste
Gyeranppang	Gyeranppang	South Korea	A fluffy bread roll with an egg in it
Gyro	Gyro	Greece	Meat (generally lamb, pork, and/or beef) cooked on a vertical rotisserie; usually served wrapped in a flatbread such as pita, with cucumber, tomato, onion, and tzatziki sauce.
Haleem	Haleem	Middle East, Central Asia, Pakistan, India, Iran	A stew made with wheat, barley, lentils, and lamb or other meat
Halo-halo	Halo-halo	Philippines	A cold dessert that is a mixture of shaved ice, evaporated milk, and various other ingredients—for example, caramelized plantains, jackfruit, tapioca, sugar palm fruit, coconut, sweet potato, boiled kidney beans, and flan
Hamburger	Hamburger	United States and elsewhere	A cooked patty of ground beef, served on a bun or roll, often with toppings such as lettuce, tomatoes, onions, and ketchup; a hamburger with cheese is known as a cheeseburger
Hokkien mee	Hokkien mee	Singapore, Malaysia (Penang)	Rice noodles and egg noodles, with prawns, pork or chicken, egg, bean sprouts, and other ingredients; served with soy sauce and sambal chili pepper sauce.
	Hoppang	South Korea	A bread with sweetened red bean paste.
Hot dog	Hot dog	United States	A sausage, usually made with beef and/or pork, grilled or steamed and served in a sliced bun with mustard and other condiments
People at an ice cream truck	Ice cream	Europe, North America, and elsewhere	Frozen, sweetened milk and/or cream, often combined with fruits or other ingredients and flavors
Hotteok	Hotteok	South Korea	A type of pancake made with yeasted wheat dough stuffed with a mixture of brown sugar, honey, cinnamon, and chopped peanuts.
Ice cream cone	Ice cream cone	United States and elsewhere	Ice cream served on an edible cone-shaped pastry that is somewhat similar to a thin, crispy waffle; this allows the ice cream to be eaten without a dish or utensils
Imqaret with ice cream	Imqaret	Malta	A sweet made with pastry and a filling of dates, usually infused with the flavours of aniseed and bay leaf, that is then deep fried
Isaw	Isaw	Philippines	Chicken intestines that are cleaned, boiled, put on a skewer, and grilled over charcoal; they are served with a dipping sauce of either spiced vinegar or barbecue sauce
Jerk chicken with rice and plantains	Jerk chicken	Jamaica	Chicken is first soaked in a spicy marinade that commonly includes allspice berries, Scotch bonnet peppers, thyme, scallions, and fresh ginger; then it is smoked over charcoal at a high temperature, resting on top of green logs of allspice wood, and under a metal cover
Jambon	Jambon	Ireland	Square pastries filled with cheese and chunks of ham
Jambon-beurre	Jambon-beurre	France	Made of a fresh baguette sliced open, spread with butter (salted or unsalted), and filled with slices of ham.
	Jeon	Korea	A fritter in Korean cuisine made by seasoning whole, sliced, or minced fish, meat, vegetables, etc., and coating them with wheat flour and egg wash before frying them in oil.
Jerusalem mixed grill	Jerusalem mixed grill	Jerusalem	Chicken livers, gizzards, and hearts that are braised with various spices and then grilled; served either on a plate or as a sandwich in pita bread
Jiaozi	Jiaozi	China and Southeast/East Asia	Dumplings with a ground meat and/or vegetable filling wrapped in a thin piece of dough; they are often steamed but they can also be fried or boiled
Jianbing guozi	Jianbing guozi	China (Tianjin)	Fried dough sticks (youtiao) wrapped and folded inside a thin crepe made from mung bean flour and eggs, served with sweet bean sauce and green onion
	Jjinppang	South Korea	A steamed bun, typically filled with red bean paste with bits of broken beans and bean husk.
	Jwipo	Korea	A traditional Korean pressed fish jerky sold as a street snack. Made from the filefish (in Korean, jwichi), it is seasoned, flattened, and dried.
Kai yang	Kai yang	Laos and Thailand	A chicken that is marinated and then grilled over charcoal; the marinade typically includes fish sauce, garlic, turmeric, coriander root, and white pepper.
Kaya toast	Kaya toast	Singapore and Malaysia	Toast with a spread of kaya (coconut jam) and butter, traditionally grilled over charcoal, commonly served with half-boiled eggs and coffee.
Kati roll	Kati roll	India (Kolkata)	A skewer-roasted kebab or other meat, wrapped in a paratha or other bread
Kebab	Kebab	Middle East and elsewhere	Small pieces of meat that have been grilled, often on a skewer over charcoal
Kerak telor	Kerak telor	Indonesia (Betawi)	Spicy coconut omelette, made from glutinous rice cooked with egg and served with serundeng (fried shredded coconut), fried shallots and dried shrimp as topping. Popular street food in Jakarta, Indonesia.
Ketoprak	Ketoprak	Indonesia (Betawi)	A vegetarian dish from Jakarta, Indonesia, consists of tofu, vegetables and rice cake, rice vermicelli served in peanut sauce.
Khachapuri	Khachapuri	Georgia	Bread stuffed with flavorful cheese and an egg
Khanom Tokyo	Khanom Tokyo	Thailand	A thin, flat pancake filled with sweet custard cream, or sometimes with a savory filling like pork or sausage, and then rolled into a cylinder.
Kinshes	Knish	Belarus, Ukraine, Lithuania, Poland, United States (New York City), and Jewish communities.	A baked turnover of dough with any of various fillings, such as potatoes or ground beef
Kofta	Kofta	Middle East, North Africa, and elsewhere	Balls or small patties of minced or ground meat—usually beef, chicken, lamb, or pork—mixed with spices and onions
Korean tacos	Korean taco	Canada, United States	A Korean-Mexican fusion dish consisting of Korean-style fillings, such as bulgogi and kimchi, placed on top of small traditional Mexican corn tortillas.
Kaya toast	Korokke	Japan	Similar to the French croquette, a breaded and fried patty made from mashed potato, white sauce and/or other ingredients.
Kottu	Kottu	Sri Lanka	Godamba roti (a type of flatbread) is chopped up and mixed with chicken or beef, eggs, and spices; the mixture is grilled, and garnished with onion, chili peppers, and other spices
Kueh Pie Tee	Kueh Pie Tee	Singapore	Also known as Nonya Top Hats, the peranakan finger food consists of yam bean, omelette, scallions and other shredded ingredients encased in crispy rice flour cups.
	Kyinkyinga	Ghana and elsewhere in West Africa	A beef kebab prepared with steak meat or liver and crusted with peanut flour. It is common in West Africa.
Katong laksa	Laksa	Southeast Asia, Peranakan cuisine	A spicy soup with rice noodles and usually either fish, prawns, or chicken; many different variations exist, with most based either on rich and spicy curry coconut milk or on slightly sour tamarind
Lángos	Lángos	Hungary	A deep-fried flatbread, served with various toppings such as sour cream and grated cheese
	Lo mai fan	China, Hong Kong and Southeast Asia	A Cantonese style sticky rice dish made with soy sauce, shiitake mushrooms, scallions, peanuts and other ingredients.
Lok-lok	Lok-lok	Malaysia	A wide variety of different food items are served on skewers. The customer selects the skewers they want, which are then cooked in boiling oil or water. A variety of dipping sauces are also provided. At the end the customer pays based on the number of color-coded skewers.
	Lontong sayeur	Indonesia, Malaysia and Singapore	Lontong sayur consists of rice cakes, vegetables, bean curd, tempeh and hard boiled egg in a coconut curry soup served with a dash of sambal.
	Lor mee	China and Southeast Asia	A thick yellow noodle dish garnished with meat, seafood, fried fritters and hard boiled egg, served in thick starchy gravy with vinegar, chili and garlic.
	Malakoff	Switzerland	Fried cheese balls or sticks.
Malatang	Malatang	China	Various foods cooked in a hot pot of spicy soup; the ingredients are on skewers that are selected by the customer
Mango Sticky Rice	Mango Sticky Rice	Thailand	A dessert of glutinous rice paired with slices of fresh mango and drizzled with coconut milk.
Maruya	Maruya	Philippines	Saba bananas cut into thin slices, coated with batter, deep-fried, and then sprinkled with sugar
Masala puri	Masala puri	India	A type of chaat made with crushed puri (a type of fried bread) mixed with peas and masala (various spices)
Meat patty	Meat patty	Jamaica	A pastry that contains various fillings and spices baked inside a flaky shell
Meat pie	Meat pie	Australia and New Zealand	A hand-sized meat pie containing largely diced or minced meat and gravy, sometimes with onion, mushrooms, or cheese and often consumed as a takeaway food snack.
Medu vada	Medu vada	India (Southern) and Sri Lanka	A fritter made from deep fried urad dal (black lentil) batter; it is usually made in a doughnut shape, with a crispy exterior and soft interior
Mee rebus	Mee rebus	Malaysia and Southeast Asia	A dish of boiled yellow noodles, slathered in a thick starchy gravy, garnished with hard boiled egg, tau-pok (tofu puffs), fried onions and green chilis.
Mee siam	Mee siam	Malaysia and Singapore	A rice vermicelli dish stir fried and garnished with bean spouts, tau-pok (tofu puffs), scallions, hard boiled egg and lime wedges. The "wet" version is served with a sweet and sour gravy.
Mie ayam	Mie ayam	Indonesia (Chinese Indonesian)	Chicken noodles of seasoned yellow wheat noodles topped with seasoned diced chicken meat (ayam). It is a popular street food in Indonesia, sold by travelling food cart.
Mohinga	Mohinga	Myanmar	A hot and sour soup made with catfish and rice noodles; often eaten for breakfast. It is considered to be a national dish of Myanmar.
	Momo	Nepal, Bhutan, Northeast and Northern India	A hot dumpling from the Himalayas that can be steamed or fried. Often eaten with garlic chutney
Murtabak vendor	Murtabak	Middle East, South/Southeast Asia	A stuffed pancake or pan-fried bread made from minced meat (beef or chicken, sometimes mutton) along with garlic, egg and onion, and is eaten with curry or gravy.
Mustamakkara	Mustamakkara	Tampere region, Finland	Finnish blood sausage traditionally eaten with lingonberry jam, usually bought and eaten fresh at market stalls.
Nasi goreng	Nasi goreng	Indonesia, Malaysia and Singapore	Indonesian fried rice with aromatic, earthy and smoky flavor of caramelised sweet soy sauce and powdered shrimp paste. Served by street vendors, in warungs and also by travelling night hawkers that frequent residential neighbourhoods with their wheeled carts.
Nasi lemak	Nasi lemak	Malaysia, Singapore and Indonesia	Rice cooked in coconut milk and wrapped with banana leaf with sambal and trimmings such as toasted peanut and egg. It is similar to the Indonesian nasi uduk and the Bruneian nasi katok.
Obwarzanek krakowski	Obwarzanek krakowski	Poland	A braided ring-shaped bread that is boiled and sprinkled with salt, poppy seeds, sesame seeds, etc., before being baked
Oden	Oden	Japan	Hot pot dish with daikon, boiled eggs, konjac, fish pastes and fried tofu fritters in a dashi soup base sold by food carts, convenience stores and izakayas.
Pad Thai	Pad Thai	Thailand	Rice noodles which are stir-fried with eggs and chopped tofu, and flavored with tamarind pulp, fish sauce (nampla น้ำปลา), dried shrimp, garlic or shallots, red chili pepper and palm sugar, and served with lime wedges and often chopped roast peanuts.
Pandan cake	Pandan cake	Singapore and Malaysia	A light fluffy sponge cake flavored with pandan extract, it is a fusion of European cake-making with local ingredients.
Panelle and crocchè	Panelle	Italy (Sicily)	A panelle is a chickpea fritter; a patty made with gram flour is deep-fried; usually served as a sandwich, sometimes with a side of crocchè (mashed potatoes and egg, covered in bread crumbs and fried)
Pani ca meusa	Pani ca meusa	Italy (Sicily)	Chopped veal spleen and lungs, boiled and then fried in lard, served on a soft bread called vastedda
Panini	Panini	Italy and France	A sandwich of various ingredients on a bread roll, heated on a press or contact grill
Panipuri	Panipuri	India	A round, hollow puri (a type of bread), fried crisp and filled with a mixture of flavored water (pani), tamarind chutney, chili, chaat masala, potato, onion and chickpeas.
Panucho	Panucho	Mexico (Yucatán)	A corn tortilla that is filled with black bean paste and refried, then topped with turkey or chicken, lettuce, avocado, and pickles
Panzerotti	Panzerotti	Italy	A fried turnover filled with mozzarella cheese, tomato sauce, and other pizza ingredients
Papri chaat	Papri chaat	India (North), Bangladesh and Pakistan	Traditionally prepared using crisp fried dough wafers known as papri, along with boiled chick peas, boiled potatoes, yogurt and tamarind chutney and topped with chaat masala and sev.
Pasty	Pasty	United Kingdom	Meat and vegetables baked inside shortcrust pastry dough; pasties are particularly associated with Cornwall in England
Pav Bhaji	Pav Bhaji	India (Maharashtra)	A thick vegetable curry (bhaji) served with a soft bread roll (pav)
Pecel lele	Pecel Lele	Indonesia (Javanese)	Deep-fried catfish served with traditional sambal chili paste, often served with fried tempeh and steamed rice. Usually sold in street-side humble tent warung.
Pempek	Pempek	Indonesia (Palembang)	A savoury fishcake delicacy from Palembang, Indonesia, made of the mixture of fish and tapioca dough. Pempek is served with yellow noodles and a dark, rich sweet and sour sauce called kuah cuka (lit. vinegar sauce).
Pepito	Pepito (Note: "The pepito is a sandwich that is one of Venezuela's most popular street foods.")	Venezuela	A sandwich similar to a torta, with beef or sometimes chicken on a bun or baguette, and condiments and sauces of the buyer's choice
Peremech	Peremech	Russia (Tatarstan, Bashkortostan)	A deep-fried pastry with meat filling; known in Russia as a belyash
Pho	Pho	Vietnam	A noodle soup of broth, rice noodles, herbs, and meat
Piadina	Piadina	Italy	A stuffed flatbread filled with a variety of cheeses, cold cuts and vegetables but occasionally with sweet fillings including jam or Nutella.
Picarones	Picarones	Peru	Its principal ingredients are squash and sweet potato, and it is served in a doughnut form and covered with syrup, made from chancaca (solidified molasses). It is traditional to serve picarones when people prepare anticuchos, another traditional Peruvian dish.
Pilaf	Pilaf	Central Asia, Middle East, South Asia	Rice cooked in a seasoned broth, and various additional ingredients are sometimes used. Mussels filled with rice is a common street food in Istanbul, Turkey.
Pirozhki	Pirozhki	Russia, Ukraine	Individual-sized baked or fried buns stuffed with a variety of fillings.
Pizza slices	Pizza	Italy, and elsewhere in Europe and North America	A thinly rolled bread dough crust, topped with tomato sauce, cheese, and other ingredients such as small pieces of meat and vegetables, and baked in an oven. It may be served whole or by the slice.
Pizza al taglio	Pizza al taglio	Italy	Pizza baked in large rectangular trays and cut into rectangular slices which are sold by weight
Pizzetta	Pizzetta	Italy	A small pizza that can range in size as a finger food at around three inches in diameter to that of a small personal-sized pizza.
Plăcintă	Plăcintă	Romania and Moldova	A traditional pastry resembling a thin, small round or square-shaped cake, usually filled with a soft cheese such as Urdă or apples.
Pljeskavica	Pljeskavica	Serbia	A grilled dish of spiced meat patty mixture of pork, beef and lamb.
Poisson cru	Poisson cru	French Polynesia	Raw tuna or other fish, marinated in lime or lemon juice, mixed with vegetables such as cucumber, tomato, and scallion, with coconut milk poured over it; poisson cru means "raw fish"; the dish is also known as ʻota ʻika
Popiah	Popiah	China and Southeast Asia	Spring roll with a crepe-like thin wrapping made from wheat flour, filled with a mixture of shredded yam bean, omelette, carrots, lettuce and bean sprouts.
Porilainen	Porilainen	Finland	Hamburger-like sandwich made from white bread and a half-inch slice of thick baloney like sausage, diced sweet onion, chopped pickled cucumber, ketchup and mustard.
Poutine	Poutine	Canada (Quebec)	French fries and cheese curds topped with a light brown gravy
Assorted pretzels	Pretzel	Europe, United States	A type of baked bread product made from dough most commonly shaped into a twisted knot.
Proben	Proben	Philippines	The proventriculus (part of the digestive system) of a chicken, breaded with corn starch and deep fried; served either in a small bagful of vinegar, or skewered on bamboo sticks to be dipped in the vinegar just before it is eaten; sometimes served with puso rice dumplings
Punugulu	Punugulu	India (Coastal Andhra)	A deep fried snack made with rice, urad dal and other spices
Pupusas	Pupusa	El Salvador	Thick corn tortillas that are stuffed with various fillings, such as pork, chicken, refried beans, and/or cheese; often served with curtido, a lightly fermented cabbage relish
Quail eggs with potato galettes	Quail eggs	Asia, Europe, North America	The eggs of a quail are prepared many different ways in various regions; in some countries they are sold as street food; for example, in the Philippines, kwek kwek are hard-boiled quail eggs that are covered with an orange-colored batter and deep-fried
	Quesadilla	Mexico	A tortilla that is filled with cheese (and sometimes other ingredients) and grilled
Ramen	Ramen	Japan	Wheat noodles served in a soy sauce and miso broth with various toppings. Every region in Japan has its own variation of this dish.
Ražnjići	Ražnjići	Serbia	Pieces of marinated pork or other meat, grilled on skewers
	Rellenitos de Plátano	Guatemala	Egg-shaped balls of cooked, mashed plantains stuffed with a mixture of refried black beans, chocolate, and cinnamon, deep-fried and served with powdered sugar or honey on top.
Cockles	Roasted cockles	Cambodia	Cockles that are roasted and then served with olive oil and seasonings
Rojak	Rojak	Indonesia (Javanese), Malaysia and Singapore	A salad made with a mixture of fruits, vegetables, and savory spices, drizzled with a prawn paste and peanut sauce.
Indian Rojak	Rojak Indian	Singapore and Malaysia	Indian Rojak or Mamak Rojak is distinctly different from the fruit and vegetables variant. A combination of fritters, potatoes, tofu, tempeh and hard boiled eggs is garnished with cucumbers, onions and green chilis and served with a spicy peanut gravy.
Roti	Roti	South Asia and elsewhere	An unleavened flatbread made with atta (a finely-ground whole wheat flour); when making roti (sometimes known as chapati) the dough is heated on a flat griddle.
Roti chanai	Roti Canai	Malaysia, Indonesia, Singapore, Brunei and Thailand	Dough that is kneaded, flattened and grilled to a crispy-chewy texture with optional condiments such as egg, usually served with a dhal curry dip. Also known as Roti prata (Singapore) or Roti thitchu (Thailand).
Roti john	Roti John	Singapore and Malaysia	A baguette that is halved and fried with a topping mixture of egg, minced meat and onions, served with cucumbers, chili or tomato sauce and mayonnaise on the side.
Roujiamo	Roujiamo	China	A sandwich of chopped meat, traditionally braised pork, that has been stewed in a soup containing many spices, and served on a bun; sometimes written as rou jia mo, it originated in Shaanxi Province
Rustico	Rustico	Italy	Mozzarella cheese, chopped tomatoes, and béchamel sauce, placed between two round pieces of puff pastry and baked; rustico originated in the Salento region of Italy
Sabudana vada	Sabudana vada	India (Maharashtra)	A deep-fried fritter made from sabudana (small balls of tapioca) and potatoes, and flavored with peanuts, coriander, and chili powder
Samosa	Samosa	India, Pakistan	A deep-fried triangular turnover filled with vegetables (especially potatoes) or meat
	Sardenara	Italy (Liguria)	Dough covered with tomato sauce and topped with anchovies, black olives, onions, and garlic, baked in an oven; sardenara is similar to focaccia or pizza
Sashimi	Sashimi	Japan	is a Japanese delicacy consisting of fresh raw fish or meat sliced into thin pieces and often eaten with soy sauce.
Satays	Satay	Indonesia and South/Southeast Asia	A dish of seasoned, skewered and grilled meat, usually served in peanut sauce. A popular street food throughout Southeast Asia; from Indonesia, Malaysia, Singapore and Thailand. Pork satay is popular in Thailand.
Sausage roll	Sausage roll	United Kingdom	Pork sausage meat wrapped in glazed puff pastry and baked
Scaccia	Scaccia	Italy (Sicily)	A type of tomato and cheese pie; very thin pizza dough is covered with tomato sauce and grated cheese, folded over a number of times, and baked
Scallion pancakes	Scallion pancake	China	Pancakes made with soft dough and scallions (green onions); they are cooked by being fried in oil
Seblak	Seblak	Indonesia (Sundanese)	A savoury and spicy dish made of wet krupuk (traditional Indonesian crackers) cooked with protein sources (egg, chicken, seafood or beef) in spicy sauce.
Sev puri	Sev puri	India	A type of chaat (a savory snack) made with puri (an unleavened, deep-fried bread), potatoes, onions, several types of chutney, and sev (small pieces of crunchy noodles made from chickpea flour)
Sfenjes	Sfenj	Morocco and elsewhere in the Maghreb	A sfenj is a deep-fried food similar to a doughnut. It is made with sticky, unsweetened dough, and usually sprinkled with powdered sugar. Traditionally it is eaten for breakfast or at tea time.
Sfincione	Sfincione	Italy (Sicily)	A type of pizza with a thick, soft crust topped with tomato sauce, onions, caciocavallo cheese, and anchovies
Shaokao	Shaokao	China	Heavily spiced, barbecued foods on skewers
Shashlik	Shashlik	Eastern and Central Europe, Central and Western Asia	Pieces of marinated lamb or other meat, grilled on skewers
Shawarma	Shawarma	Middle East	Meat (usually lamb and/or veal, or chicken) cooked on a vertical rotisserie; served in pita or a similar bread wrap, or on a plate, often with tahini sauce and other condiments
Siomay	Siomay	Indonesia (Chinese Indonesian)	A steamed fish dumpling with vegetables served in peanut sauce. It is derived from Chinese Shumai, and considered a light meal that is similar to the Chinese dim sum. A popular street food, sold by cart or bicycle food vendors.
Smažený sýr	Smažený sýr	Czechia and Slovakia	A slice of cheese (which is usually Edam, but may also be Gouda, Emmentaler, or Hermelín) about 1.5 cm thick is first breaded with flour, egg, and bread crumbs and then fried either in a pan or deep-fat fryer. It is often served accompanied by a side salad, potatoes (fries or boiled potatoes), and, typically, tartar sauce or mayonnaise. The dish may also be prepared with a thin slice of ham inserted between two slices of cheese, and in Czech fast food outlets it is often served in the form of a sandwich – in something similar to a hamburger bun.
Soon kueh	Soon kueh	China, Taiwan and Southeast Asia	A steamed dumpling in Teochew cuisine that is filled with yam bean, bamboo shoots and dried shrimps, wrapped in a white skin made of rice/tapioca flour.
Soto betawi	Soto	Indonesia	A spicy soup of meat and vegetables; many variations exist
	So-tteok-so-tteok	South Korea	A South Korean street food consisting of skewered and fried garae-tteok (rice cakes) and Vienna sausages brushed with several sauces including mustard and spicy gochujang-based sauce.
Souvlaki	Souvlaki	Greece	Small pieces of meat, usually pork, grilled on a skewer; served either in a pita wrap or on a plate
Stigghiola	Stigghiola	Italy (Sicily)	The intestines of a sheep or goat, placed on a skewer, flavored with parsley and onions, and cooked on an open grill It is one of the most common street foods in Palermo, Sicily.
	Sundae	South Korea	A type of blood sausage, and generally made by steaming cow or pig's intestines stuffed with various ingredients.
Suppli	Supplì	Italy	Italian snacks consisting of a ball of rice (generally risotto) with tomato sauce and raw egg, typical of Roman cuisine.
Sushis	Sushi	Japan	A traditional Japanese dish made with vinegared rice (鮨飯, sushi-meshi), typically seasoned with sugar and salt, and combined with a variety of ingredients (ねた, neta), such as seafood, vegetables, or meat: raw seafood is the most common, although some may be cooked. While sushi comes in numerous styles and presentation, the defining component is the vinegared rice, also known as shari (しゃり), or sumeshi (酢飯).
	Taco	Mexico	A corn or flour tortilla, with any of various fillings
Tacos al pastor	Tacos al pastor	Mexico (Mexico City)	Al pastor is a dish developed in Central Mexico, likely as a result of the adoption of the shawarma spit-grilled meat brought by the Lebanese immigrants to Mexico. Being derived from shawarma, it is also similar to the Turkish döner kebab and the Greek gyros.
Tahri	Tahri	India (Awadhi cuisine)	Basmati rice and potatoes, flavored with turmeric and other spices; a type of vegetarian biryani
Tahu gejrot	Tahu gejrot	Indonesia	A spicy tofu dish food from Cirebon, a port town in West Java, Indonesia. Tahu gejrot consists of tahu pong, a type of hollow tahu goreng (fried tofu) cut into small pieces. It is served with a thin and watery dressing that is made by blending palm sugar, vinegar and sweet soy sauce.
Tahu goreng	Tahu goreng	Indonesia, Malaysia and Singapore	A deep fried, golden-brown tofu dish served with bean spouts, carrots and shredded cucumbers, may be drizzled with a thick sweet and spicy sauce, made from shrimp paste, grounded peanuts and chili. Tahu telur is an Indonesian variation where tofu and eggs are cooked into an omelette before adding the toppings.
Tahu sumedang	Tahu sumedang	Indonesia	A deep-fried tofu from Sumedang, West Java.
Taiyaki	Taiyaki	Japan	A Japanese baked pastry in the shape of a fish with sweetened azuki beans or other savory fillings.
Tajada	Tajada	Central America	Dish of fried plantains, sliced lengthwise, in Caribbean and Central America.
Tajine	Tajine	North Africa	A slow-cooked, savory stew made with meat, poultry, or fish together with vegetables, fruit, and/or nuts; it is cooked in a large clay pot
Takoyaki	Takoyaki	Japan	A ball-shaped snack made of a wheat flour-based batter and cooked in a special moulded pan. It is typically filled with minced or diced octopus (tako), tempura scraps (tenkasu), pickled ginger, and green onion.
Tamale	Tamale	Mesoamerica	Masa (a corn-based dough made from hominy), combined with various savory ingredients and spices, steamed in a corn husk; the wrapping is discarded before eating
Tangbao	Tangbao	China	A large dumpling filled with chicken broth and pork
Tapioca chip	Tapioca chips	Southern India, Sri Lanka, Indonesia	Wafers of cassava root deep fried until crisp that may be eaten plain or tossed in spices
Taquitos	Taquito	Mexico	A corn tortilla wrapped around various fillings and then fried; taquito means "little taco"
Tataki	Tataki	Japan	
Tauge goreng	Tauge goreng	Indonesia	A savoury vegetarian dish made of stir fried tauge (bean sprouts) with slices of tofu, ketupat or lontong rice cake and yellow noodle, served in spicy oncom-based sauce.
Tlayuda	Tlayuda	Mexico (Oaxaca)	A very large, dense corn tortilla, with refried beans, asiento (rendered lard), and Oaxaca cheese, some kind of meat such as pork or chicken, and various toppings often including salsa and guacamole; served either flat of folded in half
Tokneneng	Tokneneng	Philippines	Hard-boiled chicken eggs covered with an orange-colored batter and deep-fried
	Tornado potato	South Korea	A deep fried spiral-cut whole potato on a skewer, similar to a French fry, brushed with various seasonings such as onion, cheese, or honey.
Torta	Torta	Mexico	A large sandwich with any of various meat fillings and other flavorful ingredients, served on a sandwich roll or similar bread; often eaten at lunch time It is a common street food in Mexico City, Mexico.
Skalický trdelník	Trdelník	Czech Republic and Slovakia	A pastry made by wrapping dough around a stick and roasting it over an open flame, then sprinkling it with sugar and cinnamon; sometimes it is served with additional toppings
Tteokbokki	Tteokbokki	South Korea	Small, cylindrical rice cakes coated in a spicy sauce.
	Tteok-kkochi	South Korea	A street food consisting of skewered and fried tteok (rice cakes) brushed with spicy gochujang-based sauce.
Ttongppang	Ttongppang	South Korea	A pastry that is formed in the shape of human feces; it is filled with red bean paste with walnut kernel
Turnip cake	Turnip cake	China, Hong Kong, Taiwan and Southeast Asia	Turnip cake is a standard Cantonese dim sum dish. It is made from a batter of grated turnip, rice flour, mushroom and shrimp, wok-fried and then steamed. It is often served with hot chili oil or oyster sauce.
Turon	Turon	Philippines	A type of banana fritter; sliced saba bananas, and sometimes other fruit slices, are put into in a spring roll wrapper, rolled in sugar, and deep-fried
Vada pav	Vada pav	India	A vegetarian sandwich of a deep-fried potato patty on a bun, garnished with coriander and other spices
Yaki-imo	Yaki-imo	Japan	Baked or roasted Japanese sweet potatoes (satsuma-imo) sold by street vendors and convenience stores.
Yakisoba	Yakisoba	Japan	Wheat noodles, grilled with various ingredients such as vegetables and chicken or pork, and coated with a slightly sweet, savory sauce. It is often served on a plate or in a bowl. Alternatively it is sometimes called yakisoba-pan and served in a bun similar to a hot dog bun.
Vegetarian bee hoon	Vegetarian bee hoon	Singapore	Fried noodle dish with vegetarian spring rolls, fried tofu skin, and mock meats made from gluten.
Youtiao	Youtiao	China, Hong Kong, Taiwan and Southeast Asia	A dough stick made from wheat flour, popularly eaten as an accompaniment for congee or soy milk in many Asian countries.
Zapiekanka	Zapiekanka	Poland	An open-face sandwich made of half a baguette or other long roll, topped with sautéed white mushrooms, cheese, and sometimes other ingredients, toasted until the cheese melts, and served with ketchup
Zongzi	Zongzi	China, Hong Kong, Taiwan and Southeast Asia	A traditional Chinese glutinous rice dish stuffed with various fillings and wrapped into a pyramidal shape with bamboo leaves.

== See also ==
- Street food
- Hong Kong street food
- Hot dog variations
- List of snacks
- List of kebabs
- Mexican street food
- Pojangmacha
- Regional street food
- Street food in South Korea
- Street food of Chennai
- Street food of Indonesia
- Street food of Mumbai
- Street food of Thailand
- Street market
