= Gurasa =

Hausa food

Gurasa is a local bread originating from the Northern part of Nigeria, specifically Kano state. It is similar to bread except the dough is lighter. This local Northern bread is eaten for breakfast, lunch, or as a snack.

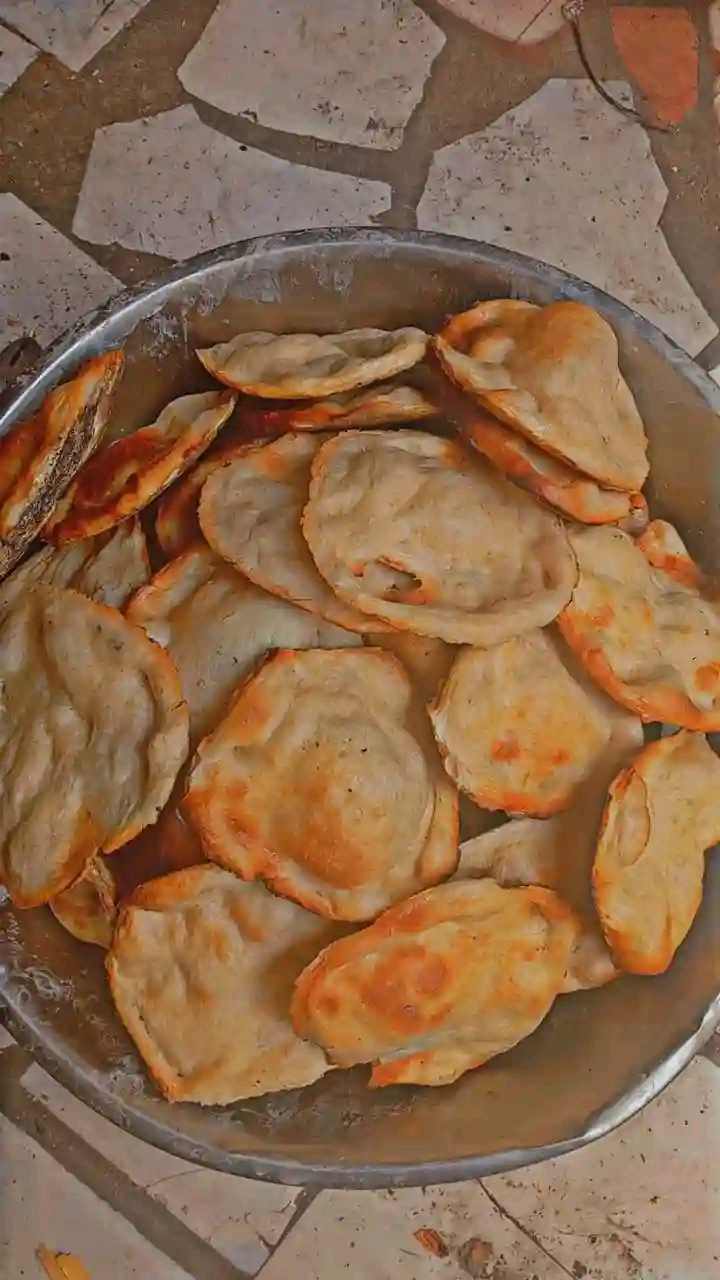
Photo of gurasa

== Overview ==
It is made from flour (whole wheat flour or conventional one ), yeast, baking powder and egg . It is baked in Tanderu which is an hausa oven made from clay. Gurasa can either be of the local type or special one. The conventional type is the local type while the special type are made by adding other spices and garnishing ingredients. The special type are more expensive than the local type.

== Origin ==
Gurasa found its way to Nigeria after some Arabian travellers settled in Kano state, they made the local bread themselves in the dala local government of Kano state. Eventually, it became food for the kings and rich ones, before it spread to other northern parts of Nigeria. It became so popular that the local bread is one of the affordable foods of the less privileged.

== Business ==
A lot of people make production of gurasa and its distribution as their source of income in Kano state, such that indigene from other states such as Niger travel down just to learn the business.

There is a village in Gado local government known as Gurasa village since their major occupation is production and distribution of Gurasa.

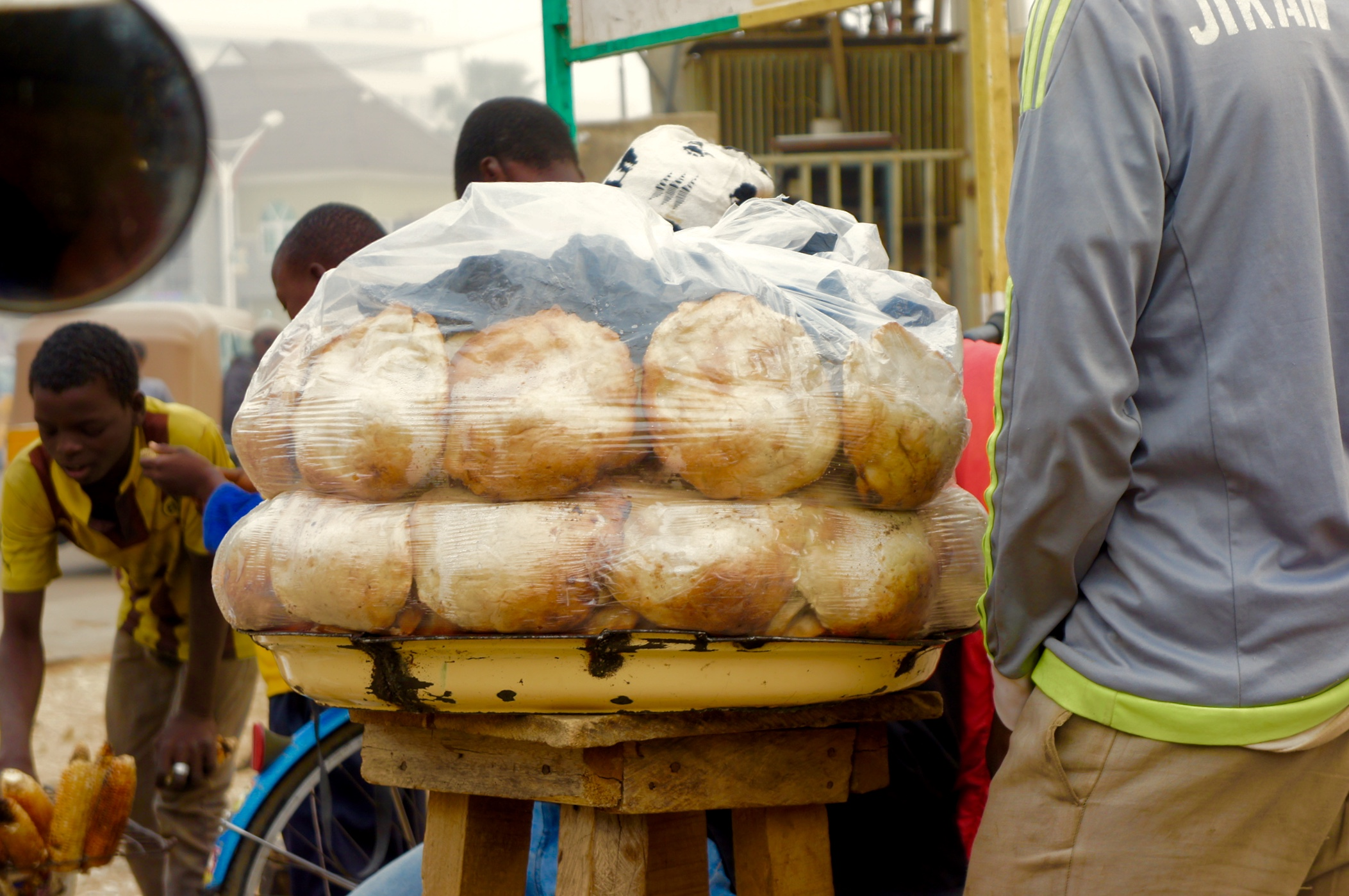
Gurasa for sale at local stand

== Other foods ==
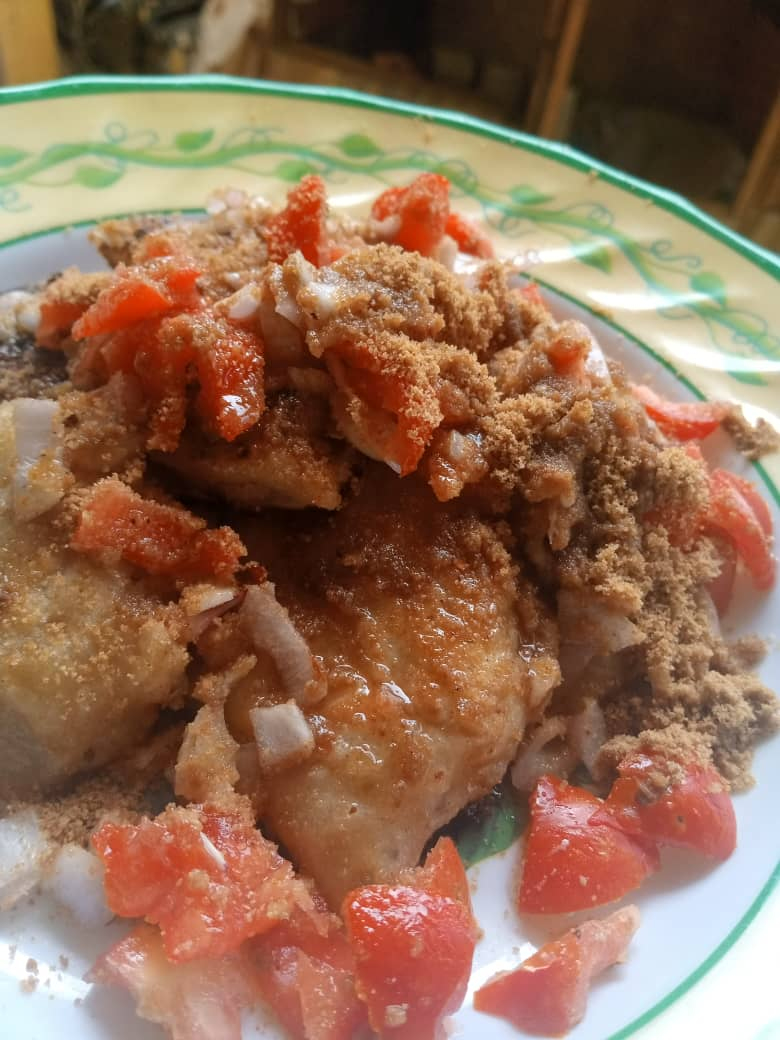
Gurasa spiced with kulikuli sauce

Gurasa can be eaten alone as a snack, with soup such as miyan taushe, vegetable soup, etc. Some also take the local bread with tea, groundnut cake known as kuli-kuli or suya.

== See also ==
- Arab cuisine
- Ethiopian cuisine
- Eritrean cuisine
- Miyan taushe
- Hausa cuisine
