= List of Junior MasterChef Pinoy Edition episodes =

The following is a list of episodes of Junior MasterChef Pinoy Edition. The finest young amateur chefs in the country battle in a kiddie cooking reality show hosted by Judy Ann Santos-Agoncillo and judged by world-renowned Filipino culinary experts Fern Aracama, Rolando Laudico, and JP Anglo. The show first aired on 27 August 2011 and ended on 18 February 2012.

== Series overview ==
Series	Episodes	Originally released	
Series	Episodes	First released	Last released
1	47	20 August 2011	18 February 2012

=== Season 1 (2011–2012) ===
- Each of the kiddie cooks will compete in four or five challenges to gain enough points to avoid the Elimination Round.
- Bea, Athena, Gino, Judel, Nadine, Louise, Tricia, Iain, Bianca, and Emman returned for the Wildcard Battle.

No.	Title	Original release date	Ratings
1	"The Appetizer"	20 August 2011	22.9%
The top 60 kiddie cooks, aged 8-12 were chosen from different areas of the Philippines (mainly Luzon, Visayas, and Mindanao) by the screening cooking their signature dish. Professional Filipino chefs Fern Aracama, Rolando Laudico, and JP Anglo were presented as the judges with Judy Ann Santos-Agoncillo.
2	"TOP 60 – Heat I: Filipino Fiesta Cuisine"	27 August 2011	27.8%
20 of the 60 participated in the first heat focusing on cuisine usually found in Filipino fiestas. Only 10 will be selected from each heat. Iain (Lemon Chicken Mediterranean Style), Bea (Adobong Tuna Buntot), Philip (Pork Kaldereta), Kyle (Pancit Luglog with Malay-Vietnamese Twist), Juday (Igado), Franz (Chicken Binakol), Louise (Laing-Stuffed Chicken), Micmic (Tinuom), Gilbert (Sugpo with Laing), and Leslie (Tilapia with Coconut Milk) triumphed and advanced to the top 30.
3	"TOP 60 – Heat II: Desserts"	3 September 2011	26.7%
In Heat II, another 20 of the top 60 kiddie cooks competed and prepared a dessert of their choice. Top 30 was then filled again by the chosen top 10 desserts. The chefs were Caitlin, Jobim, Athena, Mika, Gino, Tricia, Judel, Arcee, Nadine, and Inday.
4	"TOP 60 – Heat III: Seafood"	10 September 2011	26.5%
In Heat III, the last group of 20 kiddie cooks were tasked to create a seafood dish of their own. The top 10 seafood dishes were then chosen and the top 30 junior chefs were revealed and proceeded to the qualifying round.
5	"QUALIFYING ROUND I – Invention Test"	17 September 2011	27.8%
In the first round, the top 30 kiddie cooks are divided into 2 groups and will compete in their first Invention Test. The first group will make a chicken and vegetable dish while the second group will make a pork and fruit dish. The 10 passing kiddie cooks of each group will be the official contestants of the competition and the failed 20 kiddie cooks will still compete in the next round.
6	"QUALIFYING ROUND II – Pressure Test"	24 September 2011	25.1%
In the second round, the 20 kiddie cooks compete in their first Pressure Test. The kiddie cooks must exactly re-create the Beef Steak With Mashed Potato and Mushroom Sauce dish to be in the top 20. The rest of the 20 cooks are revealed as the top 20.
7	"Mystery Box Challenge / Invention Test"	1 October 2011	25.6%
Mystery Box: The top 20 chefs have cooked practical dish with accordance to the food allowance of an average Filipino family. The judges stated that the winner of the challenge will get 6 points and the other two of the best will get 4 and 2 points. Miko was hailed as the winner, with Bianca and Louise finishing in second and third place respectively. Miko therefore gained the power to choose the main ingredient for the invention test. Invention Test: Miko chose duck as the main ingredient over the rabbit and cuttlefish.
8	"Off-site Team Challenge: Kakanin (Rice cakes)"	2 October 2011	22.9%
The 20 Kiddie Cooks went to Barasoain Church for the next competition. They were divided into two teams, the Green Team and Yellow Team. Kyle won the last competition, so he will chose one of the kiddie cooks to join him - he picked Miko. Then Kyle distributed the clay pots to the other kiddie cooks to determine their teams. The top 20 were made to cook rice cakes. They chose 3 recipes for each team. Each team was also guided by an adviser on the cooking of rice cakes. Then, 100 churchgoers judged their rice cakes and plates were put on the table to determine the winner. The Green Team won, so they earned 6 points while the Yellow Team earned 3 points.
9	"CATCH UP – Basic Skills Test / Invention Test: Salad Dressing"	8 October 2011	23.7%
Each kiddie cook has a chance to catch up with their points by doing simple cooking skills in three rounds. The top five kiddie cooks will then proceed to the Invention Test. The Top 3 kiddie cooks will then get 1, 2, and 5 points each according to place.
10	"ELIMINATION – Pressure Test: Adobo Dish Version"	9 October 2011	21.2%
The bottom 6 will go through their first Elimination by cooking their original version of Adobo, but the judges will each taste the dishes without the junior chefs in front. ELIMINATED: Athena Garcia & Bea Atienza
11	"Mystery Box Challenge: Fairy Tale Themed Ingredients"	15 October 2011	22.9%
The kiddie cooks were tasked to cook a dish from the themed ingredients given to them. GUEST: Ivan Dorschner as The (Frog) Prince
12	"Invention Test: Birthday Cake"	16 October 2011	21.9%
Each kiddie cook were tasked to bake their dream birthday cake with the ingredient banana. GUEST: Ala Kim
13	"Off-site Team Challenge: Focaccia Bread & Dinner Rolls"	22 October 2011	22.4%
The kiddie cooks are divided into two groups to create their own version of Focaccia Bread & Dinner Rolls.
14	"CATCH UP – Basic Skills Test: Eggs / Invention Test: Eggs"	23 October 2011	22.1%
The kiddie must successfully separate the whites from yolks, after which they must beat the whites until they become fluffy and they must stay in the bowl without dropping. The top five kiddie cooks will then proceed to Invention Test. NOTE: After the challenge, Gino Yang voluntarily quit the show to participate in an international culinary summer camp in China.
15	"ELIMINATION – Pressure Test"	29 October 2011	21.7%
ELIMINATED: Jazette "Inday" Lee & Judel Bautista
16	"Mystery Box Challenge: Vegetables"	30 October 2011	21.4%
The kiddie cooks are tasked to create a tasty vegetable dish that kids will enjoy.
17	"Invention Test: Baby Back Ribs"	5 November 2011	23.7%
For this challenge, the kiddie cooks are divided into 5 groups having 3 members for the first time. Philip, the winner of the Mystery Box Challenge, gets to choose from 3 different cuts of pork. Eventually, he picks Baby Back Ribs for this challenge. The winners of the 3 groups will each get 1, 2, and 6 points each according to place.
18	"Off-site Team Challenge: Lechon (Roasted Pig)"	6 November 2011	22.2%
The kiddie cooks are divided into two teams to create their very own lechon. In the end, the green team won with 6 points each and the yellow team gets 3pts each.
19	"CATCH UP – Basic Skills Test: Moroccan Meatballs / ELIMINATION – Pressure Test"	12 November 2011	22.4%
Basic Skills Test: In this Catch-Up, the kiddie cooks must make a Moroccan Meatball that weighs exactly 50g. The top 5 kiddie cooks will then cook the Moroccan Meatballs with Risotto Dish that Chef Ferns demoed. ELIMINATED: Jean Gilbert "Gilbert" Go, Nadine Mosh "Nadine" Lee Oliver, and Louise Emmanuelle "Louise" Mabulo
20	"Mystery Box Challenge: Christmas Themed Ingredients"	13 November 2011	22.4%
In this challenge, the SUPER 12 kiddie cooks are given 12 different Christmas themed ingredients (Pineapple, Hamon, Quezo de Bola, Tablea, Lapu-Lapu, potatoes, etc). The kiddie cooks must use 4 ingredients in their dish. The top 3 dishes will get 2, 4, and 6 points according to place. The kiddie cooks who were not called will get 1 point each.
21	"Invention Test: Clams / Off-site Team Challenge"	19 November 2011	24.9%
Invention Test: After winning the Mystery Box Challenge, Miko has the power to choose the themed ingredient of the Invention Test. Miko chose clams as the themed ingredient. The top 3 will get 2, 4, and 6 points according to their place. The kiddie cooks who were not called will get 1 point each. Bianca won the challenge and earned 6 points. Off-site Team Challenge: For winning the previous challenge, Bianca has the power to choose from 2 different kinds of set menus and be the team captain of the group. Bianca preferred the Green Team's set menu. Meanwhile, Iain became the Yellow Team's captain. The kiddie cooks then arrived in Treston International College where they will cook their menus for the community. The Yellow Team wins 6pts each and the Green Team gets 3pts each.
22	"CATCH UP – Basic Skills Test: Herbs, Spices, and Leaf Vegetables / Invention Test: Taste"	20 November 2011	21.3%
The Super 12 must each identify the herbs, spices, and vegetable leaves given to them by writing their names on a whiteboard. The kiddie cooks with the highest scores would then proceed to the next round. In the next round, the kiddie cook spins a wheel with different taste (e.g. Sweet, Spicy, Sour, Sweet and Spicy, Sour and Spicy) and would be tasked to make a dish with the assigned taste. The top 3 kiddie cooks will get 6, 4, and 2 points according to place and the rest will get 1 point. Patrick won the challenge and earned 6 points. NOTE: Juday revealed that there would be eight kiddie cooks up for elimination.
23	"ELIMINATION – Pressure Test: Princess Carmen / Tag Team Challenge: Asian Surf and Turf Dish"	26 November 2011	25.2%
Elimination Round: The bottom 8 must recreate the Princess Carmen dish that was shown to them. The eliminated kiddie cook was then given a JMC Trophy proving that they are part of the Super 12. ELIMINATED: Beatrice Anne "Tricia" Baylosis Tag Team Challenge – The kiddie cooks are each divided into two teams. Each team must recreate the Asian Surf and Turf Dish in the ring. The kiddie cooks have only 15 minutes in each round. If they are having trouble, they can tag their team leaders for 2 minutes, but they can only tag them four times. The Green Team wins the challenge.
24	"Invention Test: Balut"	27 November 2011	22%
The kiddie cooks are tasked to make a dish with the ingredient balut. Kyle won the challenge and earned 6 points.
25	"Off-site Team Challenge: Cream Dory & Pie"	3 December 2011	21.6%
The kiddie cooks head to a farm for their Off-site Team Challenge. They are divided into 2 teams. Meanwhile, Kyle, for winning the previous challenge, has the power to choose what team he wants to be in. The 2 teams must cook 2 different dishes. The first dish should have fish as the main ingredient while the second dish must be a dessert pie. Alongside the chefs, the farm workers are the judges of the challenge. First, the 2 teams must catch 10 fishes for their main ingredient. The Green Team gained an additional one point for being the first to catch 10 fishes. The Yellow Team gained 6 points. NOTE: Jobim was absent in this episode and gained 1 point.
26	"CATCH UP – Taste Test & Creation Test: Pizza"	4 December 2011	TBA
In first round of the Catch-Up, each kiddie cook must name the 25 ingredients in the giant pizza. In the second round, the kiddie cooks are tasked to make their very own Pinoy-style pizza dish. The best pizza dishes will get 6 points, 4 points, and 2 points according to place.
27	"ELIMINATION: Suman Panna cotta / Mystery Box Challenge: Korean Themed Ingredients"	10 December 2011	TBA
ELIMINATED: Iain Johnston GUEST: Ryan Bang
28	"Off-Site Team Challenge: Carbohydrate & Protein Loaded Dishes"	11 December 2011	TBA
The two teams must cook a carbohydrate and protein loaded dish for 20 people. The yellow team won 6 points. GUESTS: University of the Philippines Dragon Boat Team
29	"Invention Test: Roots to Riches / Pressure Test: Orange-Balsamic Adobo Chicken Dish"	17 December 2011	15.4%
Invention Test: For winning the previous challenge, the yellow team is given 3 different root crops, gabi (taro), ube (purple yam), and camote (sweet potato), to choose from. Mika chose ube for their main ingredient. The kiddie cooks are then tasked to cook an appetizing ube dish. But they must think of a perfect combination with ube. The winning dishes will get 6, 4, & 2 points according to place. GUEST JUDGES: Chef Mau & Uncle Larry Pressure Test: The kiddie cooks must recreate Chef Steph's Orange-Balsamic Adobo Chicken for one hour. GUEST JUDGE: Chef Steph Zubiri
30	"ELIMINATION – Skills Test & Creativity Test: Bangus"	18 December 2011	18.1%
Skills Test: The bottom 5 kiddie cooks must debone the whole bangus (milkfish). The top 2 kiddie cooks will be saved from the Creativity Test. Creativity Test: The 3 kiddie cooks must create their own stuffed bangus. ELIMINATED: Bianca Franchesca "Bianca" Dimapilis
31	TBA	24 December 2011	TBA
32	TBA	25 December 2011	TBA
33	TBA	31 December 2011	TBA
34	TBA	1 January 2012	TBA
35	TBA	7 January 2012	TBA
36	TBA	8 January 2012	TBA
37	"Tag Team Challenge: Sinigang / Pressure Test"	14 January 2012	TBA
Tag Team Challenge: The kiddie cooks are divided into four teams with one guest star. The kiddie cooks will instruct the comedians to cook sinigang using different base ingredients namely tamarind, camias, guava, and green mango for 40 minutes and the remaining 10 minutes is for the kiddie cooks to plate the dish. The best 3 dishes will get 2, 4, and 6 points according to place. GUESTS: Jason Gainza, Tado Jimenez, Rubi-Rubi, and Kakai Bautista Pressure Test – The kiddie cooks must recreate the Heavenly Chocolate dish. GUEST: Chef Buddy Trinidad
38	"ELIMINATION"	15 January 2012	TBA
The bottom 5 proceeded into another elimination round where one kiddie cook will lose the chance to become the Junior MasterChef grand winner. To escape elimination, the kiddie cooks will go through a two-part match and prepare tasty on-the-go snacks and siopao. ELIMINATED: Emmanuel "Emman" Buquid
39	"WILDCARD BATTLE – Mystery Box Challenge"	21 January 2012	TBA
Ex-kiddie cooks, Bea, Athena, Gino, Judel, Nadine, Louise, Tricia, Iain, Bianca, and Emman, are back to compete for a spot to continue their journey. They must undergo 5 challenges. With each challenge, 2 kiddie cooks must end their journey. RE-ELIMINATED: Nadine Mosh "Nadine" Lee Oliver & Gerardo Angel "Gino" Yang NOTE: Despite being eliminated in the previous episode, Emman returns as an ex-kiddie cook.
40	"WILDCARD BATTLE"	22 January 2012	TBA
RE-ELIMINATED: Maria Judel "Judel" Bautista & Beatrice Anne "Tricia" Baylosis
41	"WILDCARD BATTLE"	28 January 2012	TBA
RE-ELIMINATED: Emmanuel "Emman" Buquid & Maria Josefina Beatriz "Bea" Atienza
42	"WILDCARD BATTLE"	29 January 2012	TBA
WINNER: Louise Emmanuelle "Louise" Mabulo RE-ELIMINATED: Bianca Franchesca "Bianca" Dimapilis, Iain Johnston & Athena Garcia
43	TBA	4 February 2012	TBA
ELIMINATED: Mikkel Gabriel "Miko" Manzano & Pomeleigh May "Acee" Salangsang
44	TBA	5 February 2012	TBA
45	TBA	11 February 2012	TBA
46	TBA	12 February 2012	TBA
In the end, the Top 4 kiddie cooks are given their official jackets and knife set. The Top 4 will face-off in the live finale to become the first Pinoy Junior MasterChef. ELIMINATED: Louise Emmanuelle "Louise" Mabulo & Caitlin Faye "Caitlin" Taluban
47	"FINALE: The Live Cook-Off"	18 February 2012	26.3%
In the first challenge, the kiddie cooks are given ₱300 to buy their ingredients in a local farmer's market. They must cook their dishes and present it to the chef judges. Their dishes are also judged by 100 average people from their score sheets. The hosts revealed each kiddie cooks' scores from the chef judges and later from the 100 average people. In the second challenge, the kiddie cooks are given 30 mins to cook their dream dish. The judges will each taste their dishes and give their scores. After judging the dishes, the hosts proclaimed Jobim Jalbuena as the 4th placer with 73.4 total points and Mika Tanaka as the 3rd placer with 84 total points. Philip Amarillo was then proclaimed as the 2nd placer with 91.1 total points, which means Kyle Imao is the first Pinoy Junior MasterChef with 91.8 total points. GUEST JUDGE: Chef Glenda Rosales-Barretto NOTE: This episode aired live and was held in Treston International College. Earlier on, Samsung gave thanks to the show by giving each kiddie cook their new Samsung microwave oven and a Samsung Galaxy Tab to the first Pinoy Junior MasterChef.

== See also ==
- List of programs broadcast by ABS-CBN Corporation
- Junior MasterChef
- MasterChef
