= Cupbop =

American fast casual restaurant chain

Cupbop Inc.

Restaurant information
- Established: 2013; 13 years ago, in Salt Lake County, Utah, United States
- Owners: Junghun Song and Dok Kwon
- Food type: Korean style Fast casual
- Location: United States and Indonesia
- Website: Cupbop.com

Cupbop (stylized as CUP-BOP) is an American fast casual restaurant chain located in the United States and Indonesia. They serve street-food style Korean barbecue, otherwise known as cup-bap (Korean: 컵밥).

Cupbop started out in 2013 as a food truck in Salt Lake County, Utah and has since grown to brick-and-mortar stores and concessions locations in other states. The restaurant is credited with bringing Korean BBQ to Utah. As of June 2024, in the United States there are 64 total store locations, six food trucks, and several concessions locations including the Delta Center. The chain also operates over 180 locations throughout Indonesia. In 2024 the chain saw $64 million in annual revenue.

== History ==
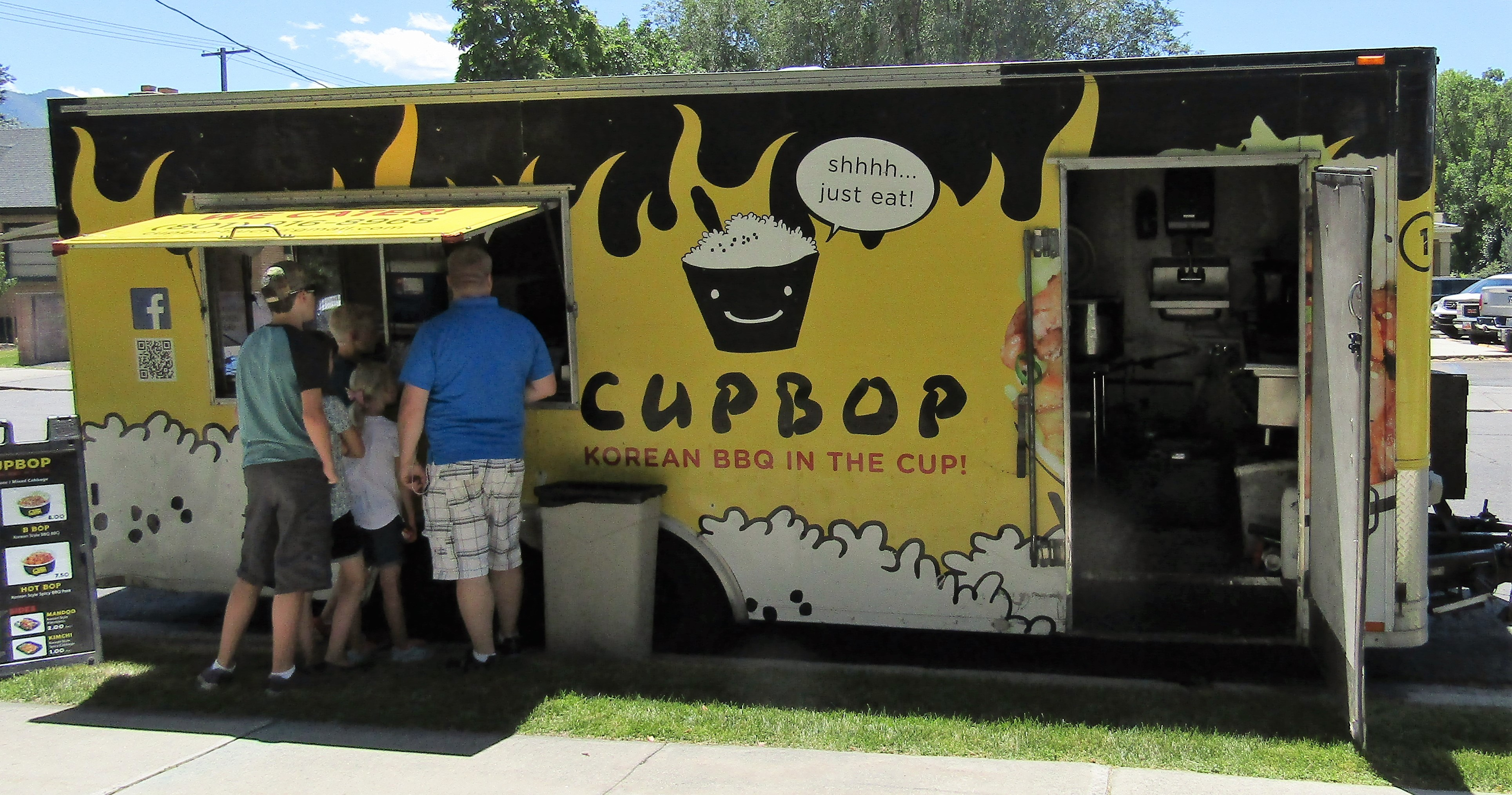
A Cupbop food truck in Utah in 2018.

Junghun Song started Cupbop after finding out that Korean cuisine was not represented at a Utah food convention in 2013. Song spent his entire savings of 15 million won ($13,000) on a 2.4-pyeong food truck and two of his friends began selling Noryangjin-style Korean cuisine out of a 20-year-old food truck soon after and became the founders and co-owners of Cupbop.

Dok Kwon, a Korean-born hedge fund investor, was one of Cupbop's first customers. Kwon joined Cupbop as a partner in 2020.

Throughout 2015, Cupbop expanded by opening more food trucks and a brick and mortar restaurant near Brigham Young University. The company's recognizable branding led it to be frequently posted on social media and become known around the BYU campus. Cupbop ran local events and marketing campaigns to promote growth. Since its inception, Cupbop has opened over 64 stores across the U.S. and its sales have surpassed $64 million USD (30 billion won).

Cupbop saw acclaim in the restaurant industry with its inclusion in Yahoo's selection of "27 of the Best Food Trucks in America" and was voted as the number one food truck in Utah in 2021.

In May 2022, the company's owners appeared on the American television show Shark Tank and asked for $1 million in exchange for a 3% stake in the company. They made a deal with billionaire investor Mark Cuban, selling him 5 percent of the company for 1 million USD. As of 2025, they operate 60 stores across 7 states–Utah, Idaho, Arizona, Colorado, Nevada, Oklahoma and Texas, and 220 stores in Indonesia. In July 2025, Cupbop opened their first store in Dubai through Alfahim Hospitality with an agreement to open 9 more stores there. They have also signed a contract with Canadian corporations to open Cupbop stores in Canada.

== Menu ==
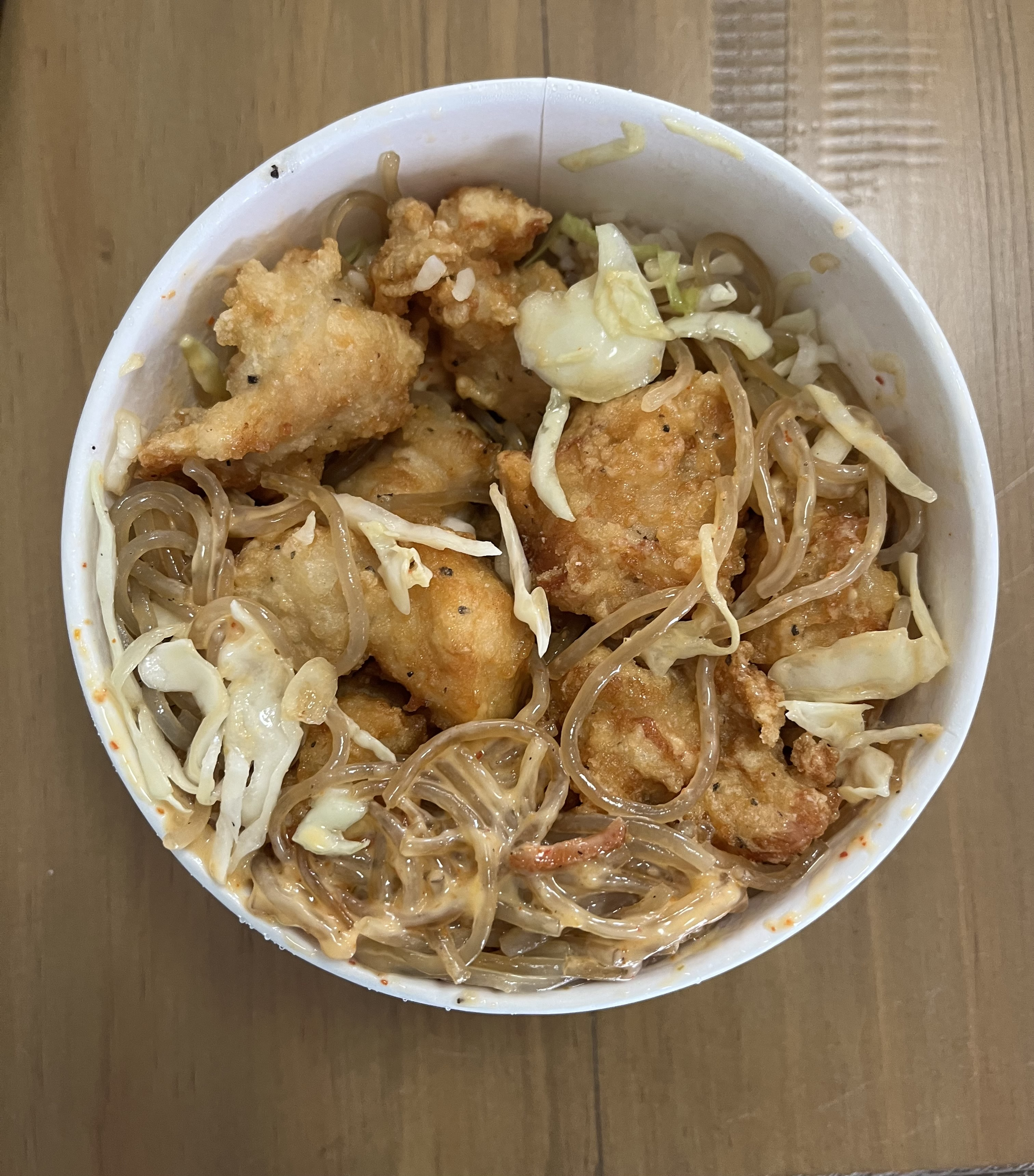
A mixed order of Ugly Bop

Cupbop's menu consists primarily of steamed rice bowls. They offer several different kinds of bowls, including Korean-style chicken katsu, Korean barbecue chicken, Korean barbecue pork, fried chicken, Korean barbecue beef, steamed vegetables, fried tofu, and sweet potato noodles, all served Korean barbecue style alongside white rice and cabbage. Cupbop also serves other Korean staple foods as sides, like mandoo (a Korean dumpling), Korean-style corn dogs, and kimchi. They also sell Milkis, a South Korean soft drink, and Yogo Vera, a non-carbonated Korean beverage flavored with aloe vera.
