= Dibi (food) =

Senegalese dish

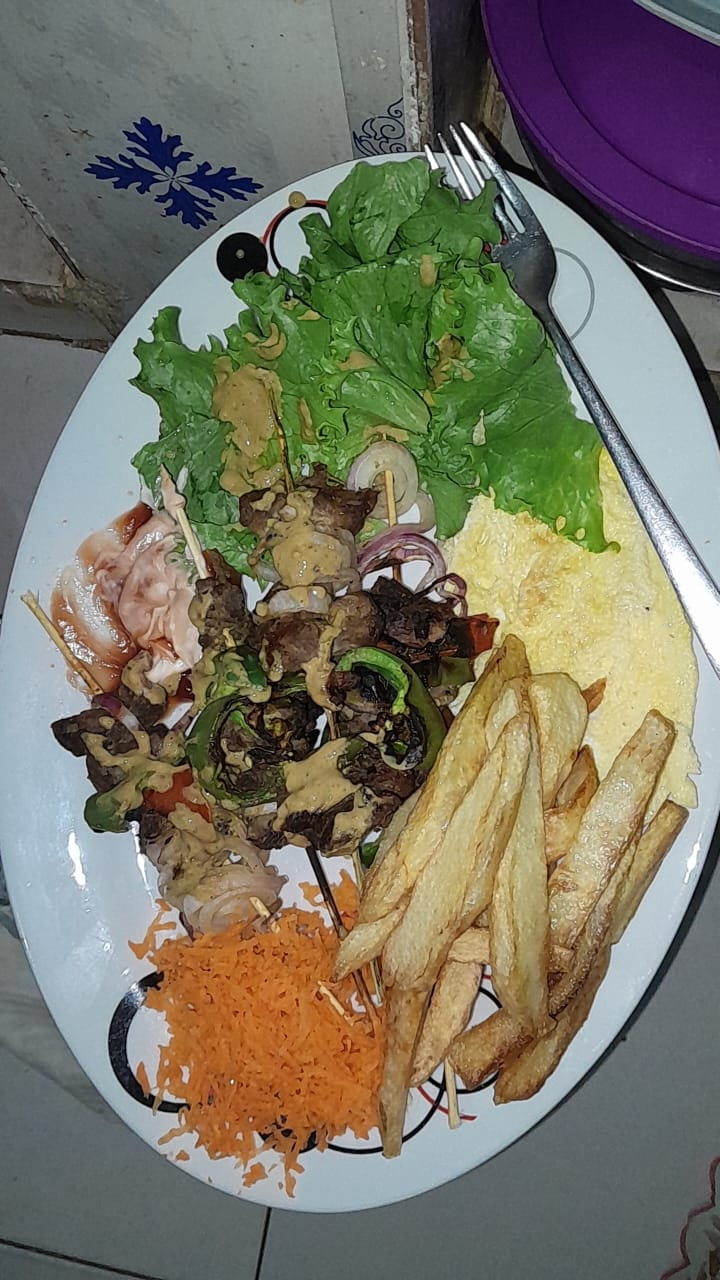
A plate of dibi, with salad and a side of french fries

Dibi is a Malian dish consisting of fire-grilled meat (usually lamb) that has been seasoned and cut into pieces. Dibi is typically served with grilled or raw onions, mustard, and bread. Eateries that serve dibi are called "dibiteries." Dibi is commonly served by street vendors in Mali and Senegal. Many dibiteries in Senegal's capital city of Dakar are run by foreigners, particularly from the Hausa people of Nigeria. "Dibi" is a Soninke word that refers to barbecue.

Dibi is not to be confused with "dibi Hausa", the Senegalese term for suya. Both dibi and dibi suya are cooked on a grill or a wood-burning stove, but dibi is not sliced thinly like suya, nor is dibi marinated in kankankan spice. Whole lamb can be ordered from some dibiteries and is considered a delicacy. Slow-roasting a whole lamb is referred to as méchoui. Méchoui is a Maghrebi style of cooking introduced to Senegal from Mauritania. Dibi is often served with a side of fried plantains, French fries, or a tomato and lettuce salad.

== See also ==
- Barbecue
- Kyinkyinga
- Malian cuisine
- Senegalese cuisine
- Suya
