= Lok-lok =

Malaysian street food

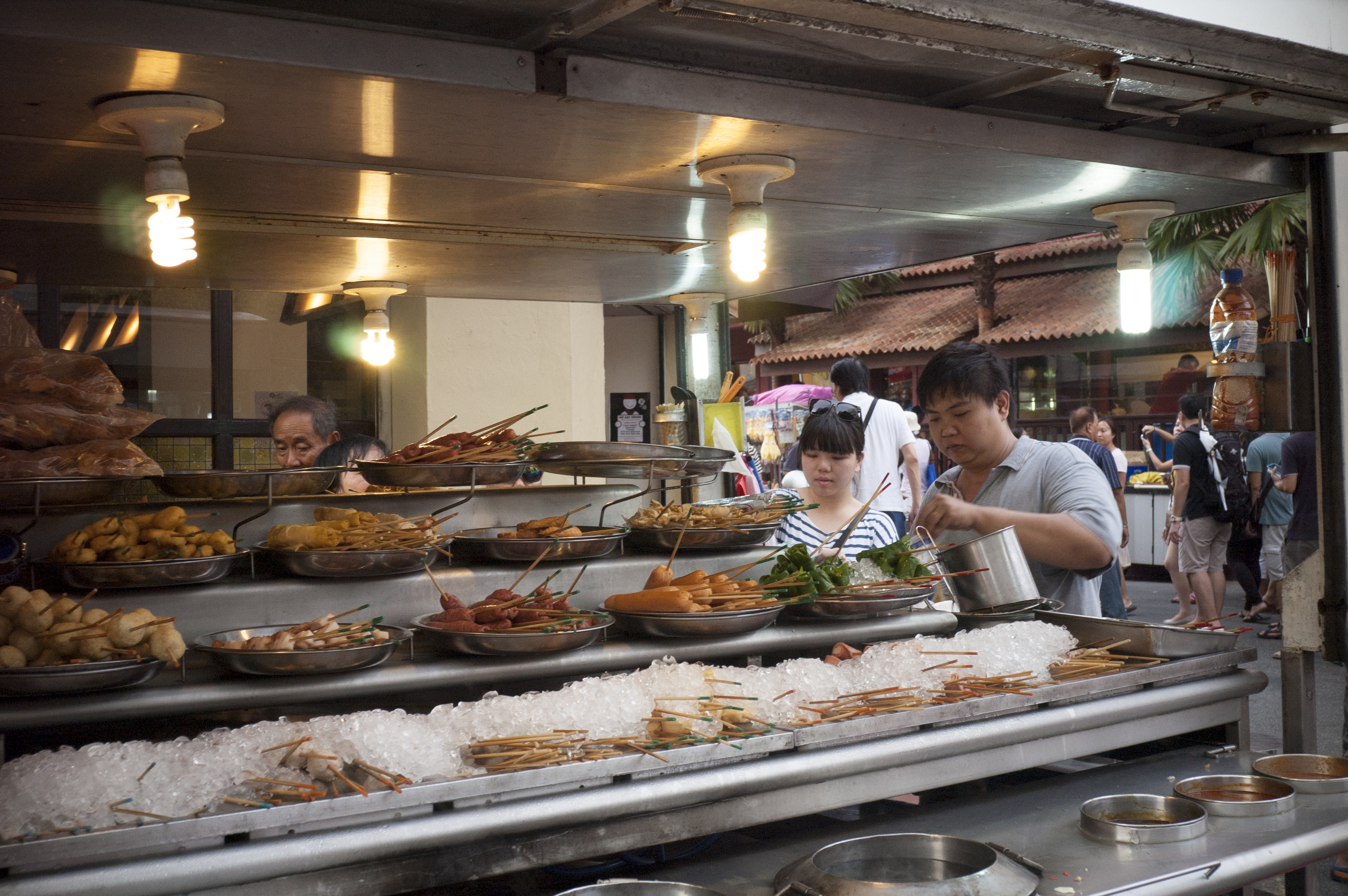
A lok-lok stand in Malacca

Lok-lok is a dish consisting of various steamboat style foods inclusive of meats and vegetables that are served on a skewer in mobile form.

It is a street food in Malaysia, in cities such as Malacca, Kuching, among others.

== See also ==
- List of street foods
