= Kyinkyinga =

Skewered meat dish

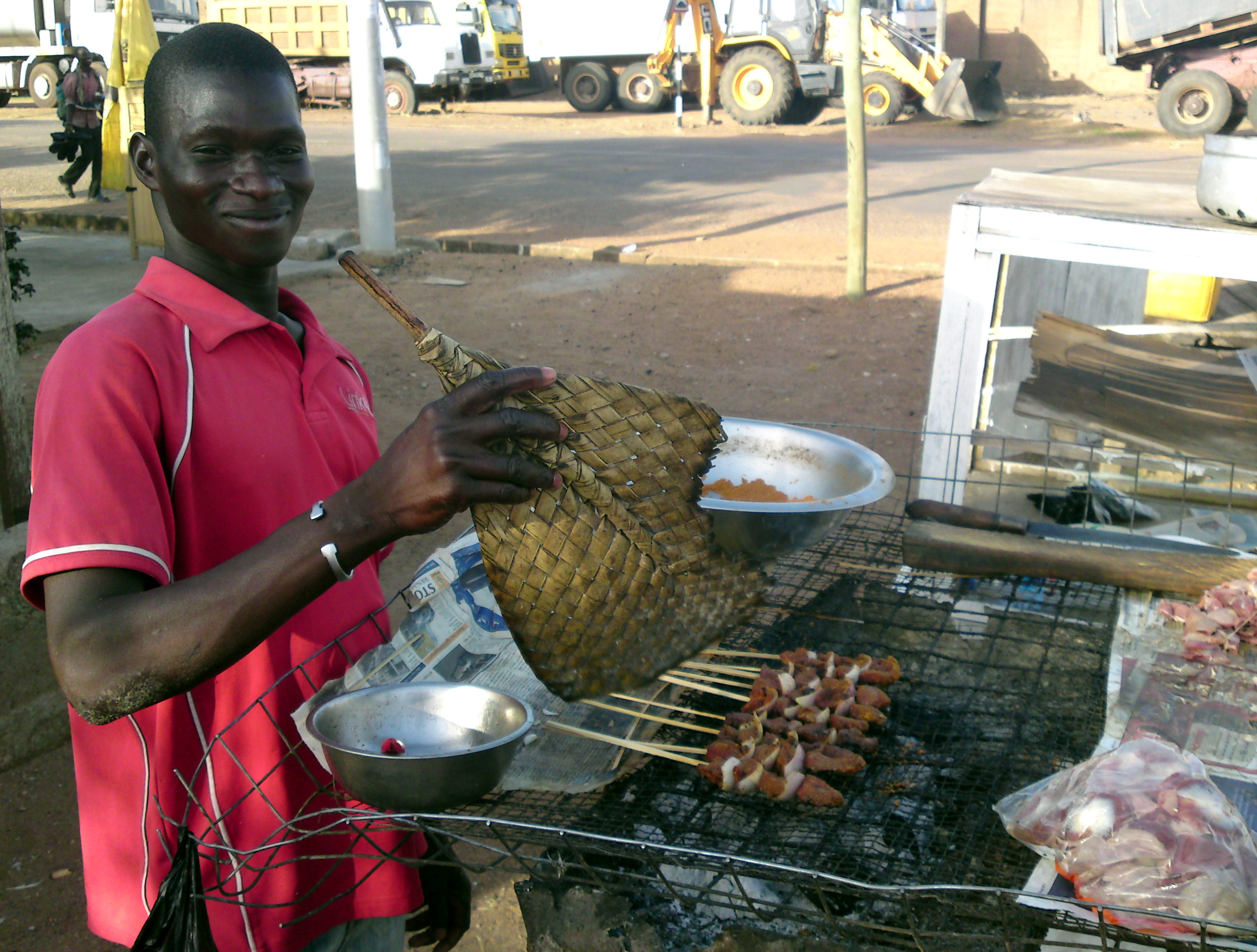
Kyinkyinga prepared by a street vendor

Kyinkyinga (pronounced chin-chin-gá) or cincinga (Hausa orthography), is a grilled meat skewer or kebab that is common in West Africa and is related to the Suya kebab. Kyinkyinga is a Ghanaian Hausa dish popularised by traders in the Zango areas of town and cities, and has since becoming popular among other Ghanaians. It is hence very similar to or synonymous with the suya kebab in Nigeria and Niger, also known as suya, tsinga, cinga, cicinga, cincinga, tsire agashi, cacanga or tankora in the Hausa language.

It is prepared by coating the meat in what is called tankora or yaji, a spice mix typical to Hausa cuisine. It is a mixture of dried hot peppers, dried ginger, dried onion, other spices, and toasted peanut flour. The meat is then threaded onto a skewer, often interspersed with onions and bell peppers, then grilled. It has been described as a staple street food in Ghana.

== See also ==
- Dibi
- List of kebabs
- List of street foods
- Suya
