= Suya =

Skewered grilled meat, popular in Nigeria

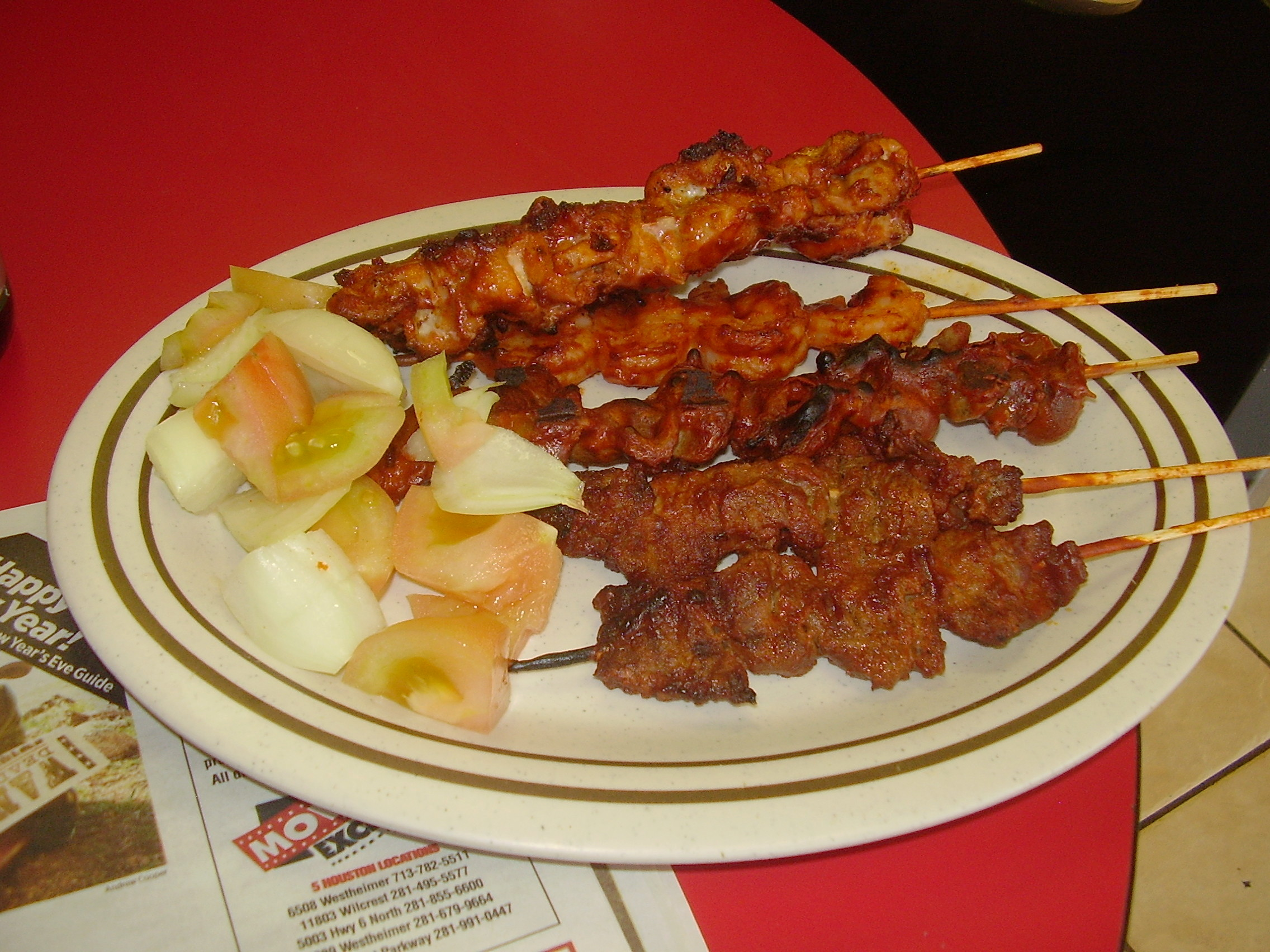
- Place of origin: Nigeria
- Region or state: Northern Nigeria
- Invented: 1852
- Main ingredients: Meat, chicken, shrimp
- Variations: (Kilishi, Balangu)

Suya, also known as Tsire, is a traditional Hausa (Nigerian) smoke-grilled spiced meat on skewer. Suya is generally made with thin-sliced spiced beef, lamb, goat, ram, or chicken arranged on wooden skewers. Organ meats such as kidney, liver and tripe as well as other types of meats and seafood (shrimp) are also sometimes used. Suya is most popular as evening street food or snack, restaurant appetizer, and as accompaniment with drinks at bars and night spots.

Suya meat is thinly sliced and then marinated in a traditional Hausa spice mix called 'Yaji' which consists of dry hot chili & cayenne peppers, ginger, dried onion, ground peanut cake ('Kuli-Kuli'), salt and other spices. The skewered meats are doused with vegetable oil before they are cooked on the grill.

As with curry, there is no standard recipe for composing the complex Yaji spice mix mixture of spices and additives which make up the Suya marinade and dry toppings served alongside it. Ingredients vary according to personal and regional preferences.

The cooked suya is usually sliced off the skewers and cut into bite-size bits. It is often served with an extra topping or side helping of yaji pepper mix as well as sliced onions and tomatoes, which may be requested grilled or raw as preferred. In traditional Hausa culture, a side serving of Hausa masa (soaked rice/grain/corn cakes) is common. Suya can also be eaten with rice, kosai, garri or ogi.

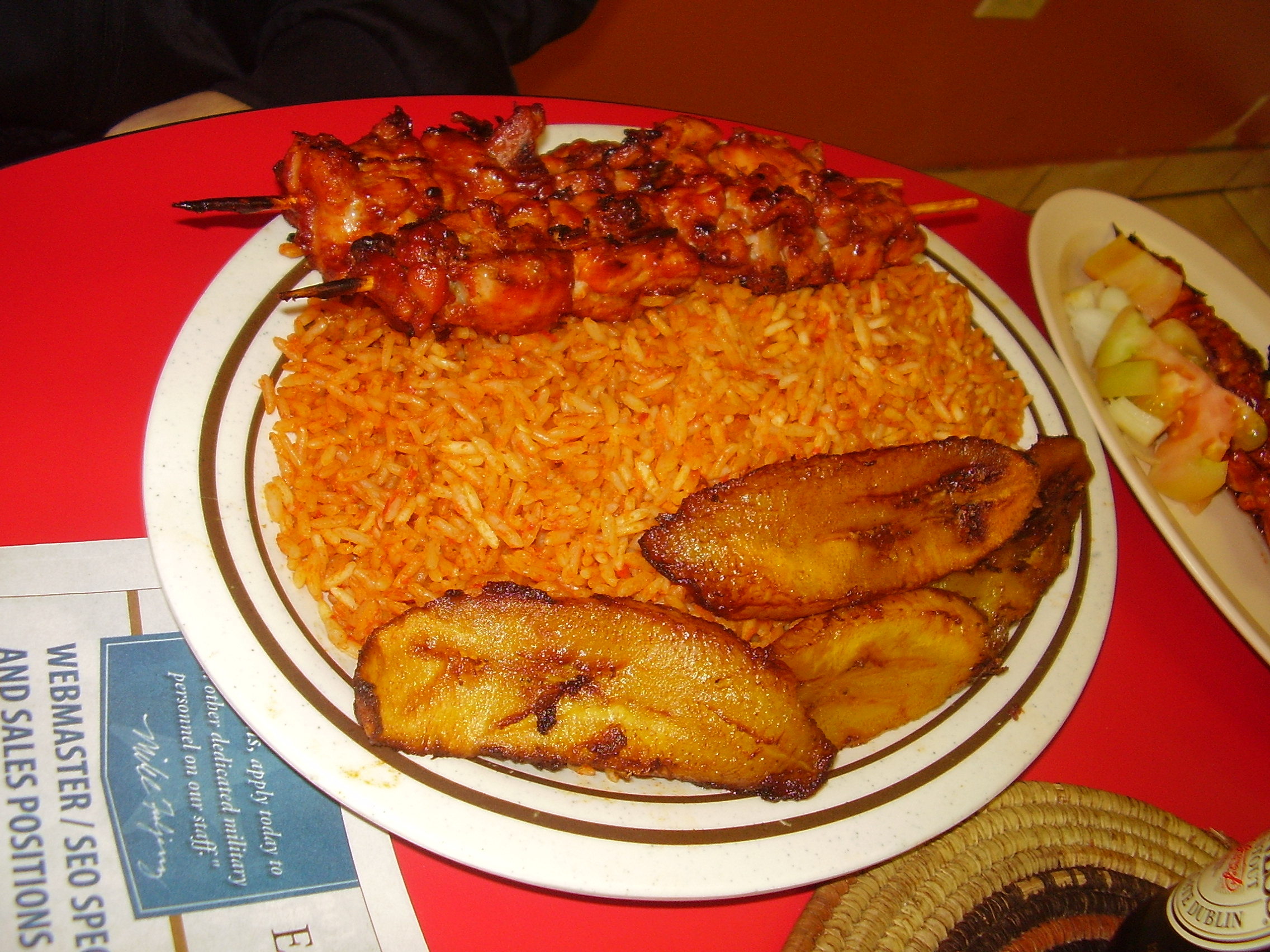
Chicken suya with jollof rice and plantains

Originating from Nigeria but popular across West Africa and its diaspora, suya is a large part of Hausa culture and food. While suya is the more widely recognized name in many areas of Nigeria, the Hausa community still predominantly uses the original name, 'tsire'. There are many variation of grilled meats in traditional Hausa cooking (such as Balangu, Kilishi, etc.), but the most popular is Suya. The dried version of Suya is called Kilishi.

Halal meat preparation methods are normally used, especially in the northern parts of Nigeria where it originates as is customary with traditional Hausa foods, where the suspicion of nonconformity to Muslim dietary prohibitions in Suya preparation has been known to cause riots.

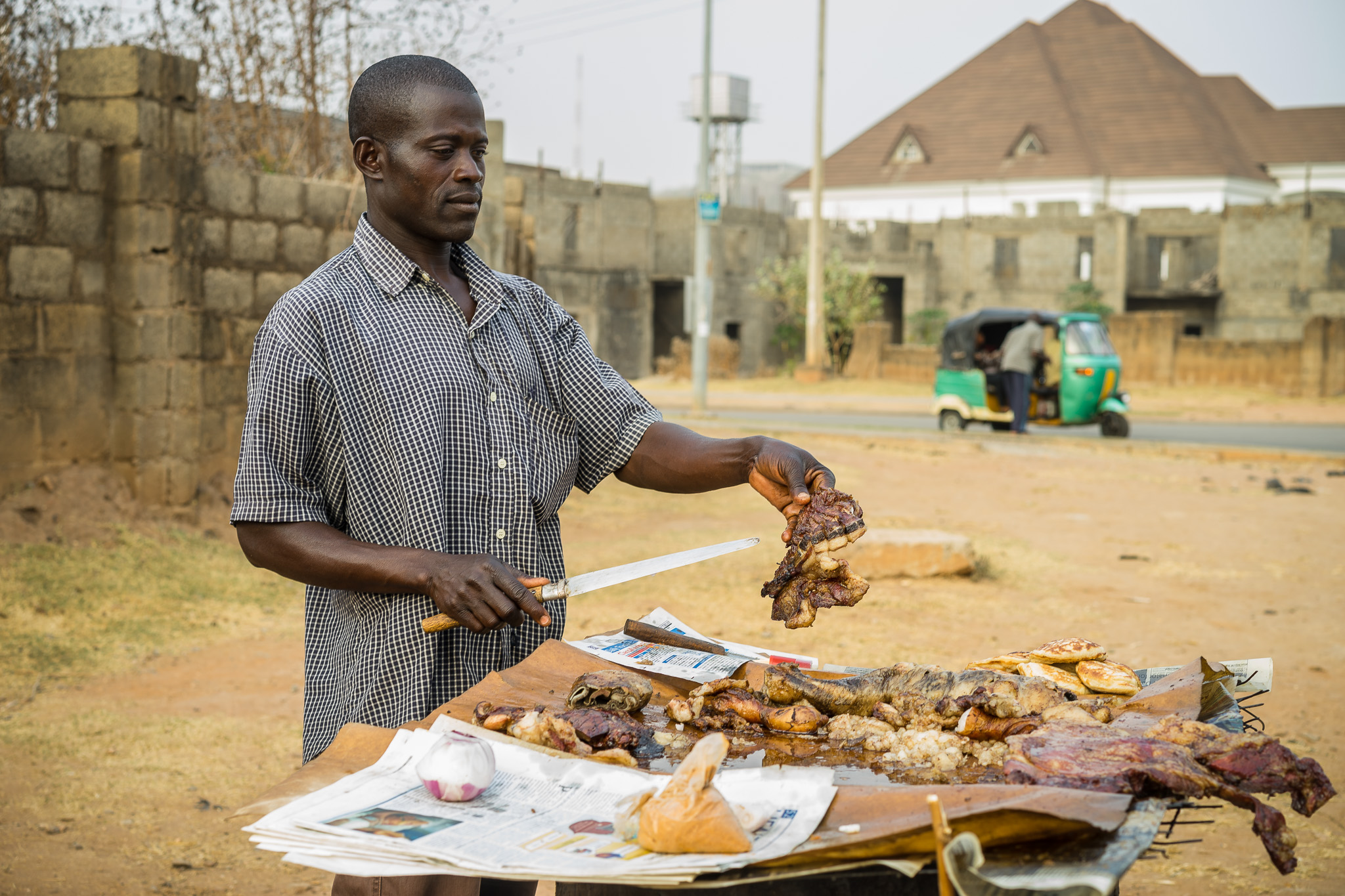
Suya seller in Abuja.

Suya is traditionally and predominantly prepared by Hausa men who are called 'mai tsire' or 'mai suya' ('mai' being the Hausa word for 'seller of').

Although Suya is a traditional Hausa Nigerian dish, it has permeated the Nigerian society, being affordable for all and available everywhere. It has been called a unifying factor in Nigeria. Suya has become a Nigerian national dish, with different regions claiming the superiority of their recipe and methods of preparation, but similar grilled meat recipes are common in many West African countries.

== See also ==
- Dibi
- Kyinkyinga
- List of African dishes
