= Es goyang =

Indonesian street food

Es Goyang
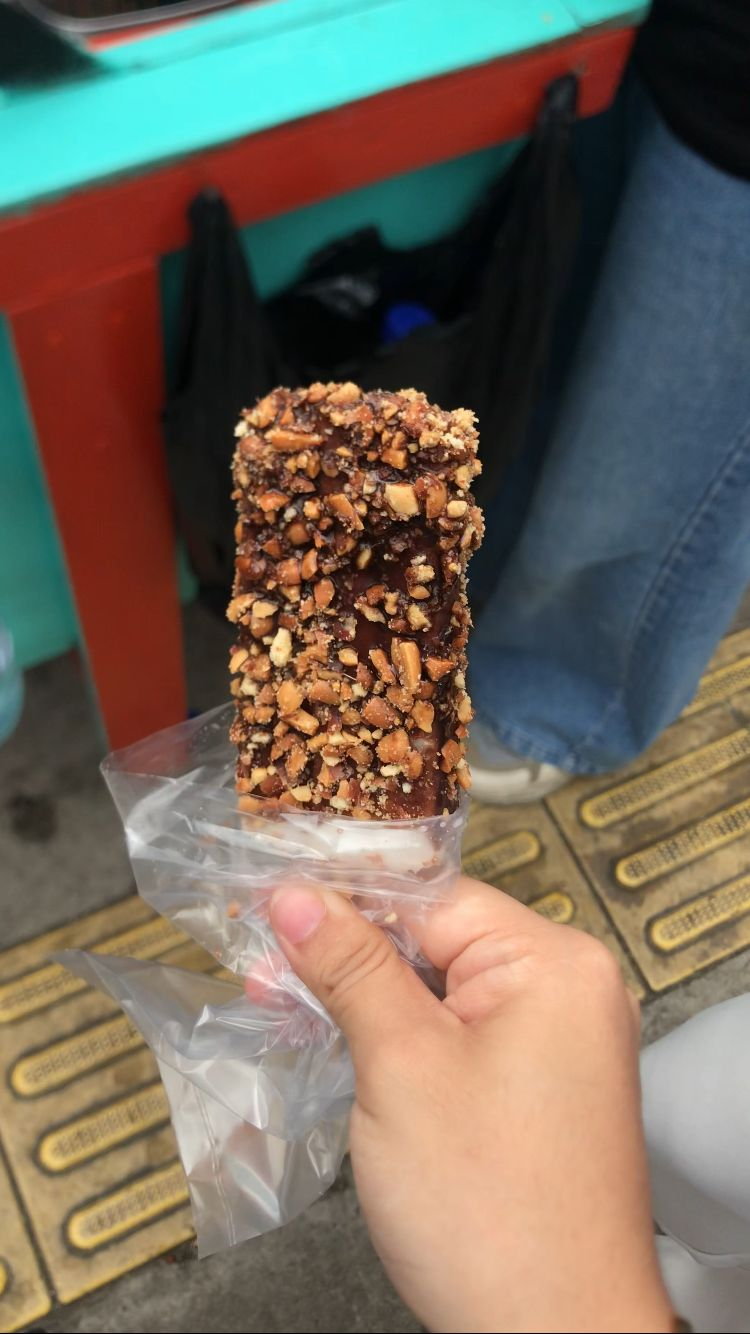
- Course: Dessert
- Place of origin: Indonesia
- Serving temperature: Frozen
- Main ingredients: Sugar, sweetener, corn flour, coconut milk, chocolate, mung bean flour
- Ingredients generally used: Peanut, sprinkles

Es goyang is a traditional Indonesian street food usually sold by street vendors on the side of roads. It is usually prepared on the spot, dipped into melted chocolate when it freezes, toppings are also sometimes put onto the es goyang when the chocolate is still liquid. Some of the most popular toppings for es goyang are peanuts and sprinkles.

== History ==
Es goyang was invented in during the early 1970s though it was most well known in the 1980s and 1990s. Es goyang has always been sold in carts with slots to make it. The cart would be shaken side to side to let it freeze evenly. This is where it got the name es goyang from, goyang means shake in Indonesian.

Es goyang was usually sold in front of schools or other building in big cities as to attract more customers. Though today, the amount of es goyang vendors is decreasing due to modernization in cities and lack of interest in general. The oldest known es goyang vendor still operating as of 2018 is a vendor in South Jakarta, they have been continuously selling es goyang since 1972. Lack of interest is suspected to be because of competition from other variations of ice cream street foods.

== Making process ==
Unlike other variations of ice cream, es goyang is not made with any cream or milk. Instead it uses mung bean flour and corn flour as its base. Sugar is added to make it sweet. At this stage, a flavoring is added to the mixture, usually vanilla, chocolate, strawberry, or mung bean. Then the mixture is boiled over a small flame while being continuously mixed. After it boils, it is put in a mold in an ice bath or in a freezer.

After the mixture is put into the mold, a skewer is put in place. It is left to freeze until solid. If it was made in a traditional cart, it would be shaken to speed up the freezing process and so it freezes evenly. After the mixture is solid, it is put into melted chocolate to give it a coat of chocolate. Toppings might also be put on the es goyang, such as peanut chunks or sprinkles.
