= So-tteok-so-tteok =

South Korean skewered dish

So-tteok so-tteok
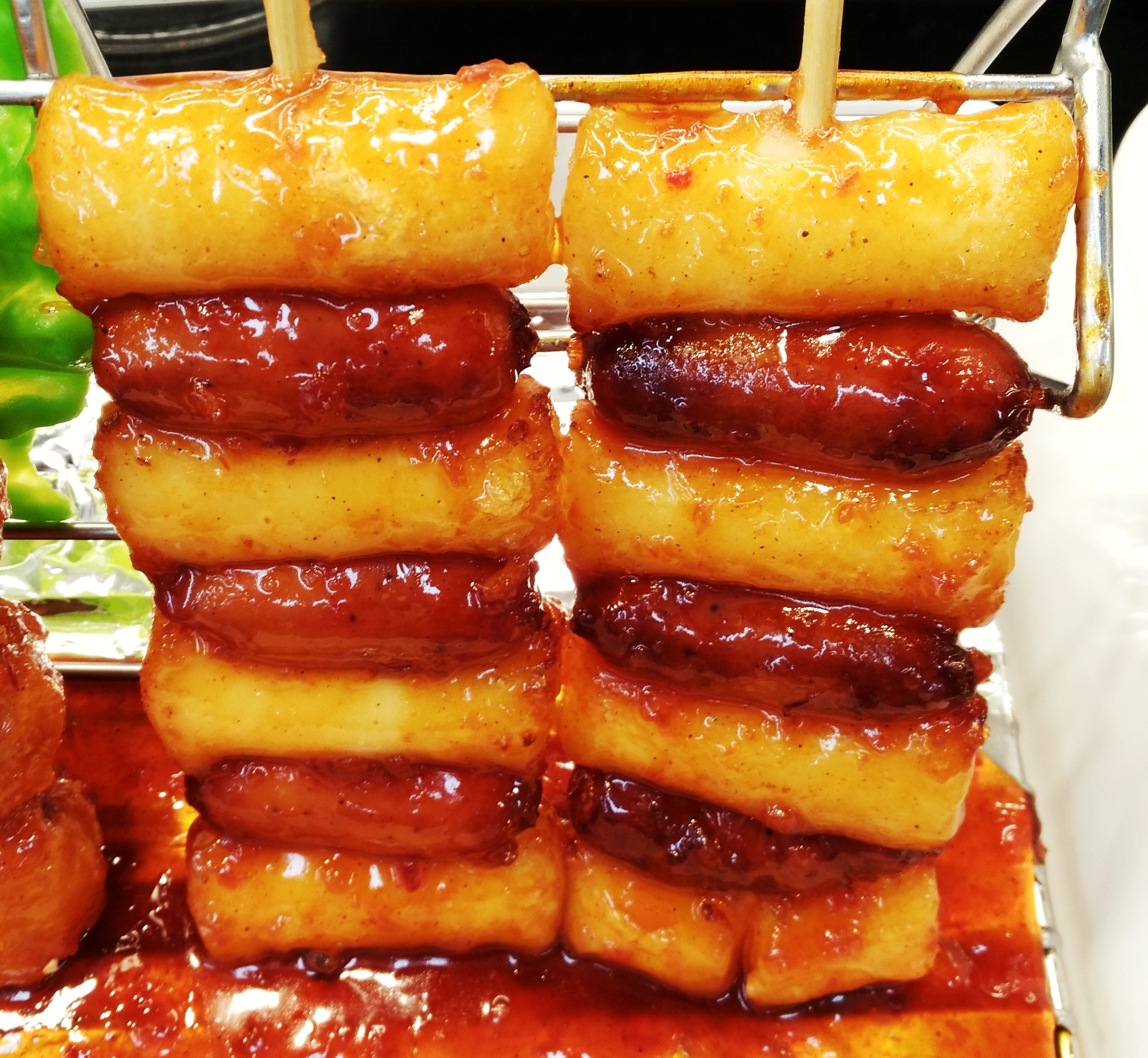
- Type: kkochi
- Place of origin: South Korea
- Associated cuisine: South Korean cuisine
- Serving temperature: Warm
- Main ingredients: Garae-tteok, Vienna sausage

Korean name
- Hangul: 소떡소떡
- RR: sotteoksotteok
- MR: sottŏksottŏk

So-tteok so-tteok (Korean: 소떡소떡), sometimes translated as sausage and rice cakes, is a popular South Korean street food consisting of skewered and fried garae-tteok (rice cakes) and Vienna sausages brushed with several sauces including mustard and spicy gochujang-based sauce. It is a portmanteau as well as a reduplication of sausage (소시지) and tteok (떡).

Initially, it was only available on a highway rest stop in Anseong. In March 2018, comedian Lee Young-ja introduced the dish in a television broadcast. The broadcast caused the dish to explode in popularity. By the end of that year, of all rest stops in Korea, Anseong ranked third in total sales.

Since then, rest stops across the country began offering the same snack, with restaurants and convenience stores following suit. Vendors created modifications of the dish, for example by adding cheese or even dalgona. The South Korean government and companies began promoting the dish abroad. So-tteok-so-tteok was one of the dishes representing South Korea at the 2023 ASEAN Food Festival in the Philippines, where it received a long queue, while South Korean restaurants in Malaysia have started to serve the snack.

During the COVID-19 pandemic, the renowned boy band BTS filmed in locations across Gangneung, Pyeongchang and Busan, and on one instance recommended so-tteok so-tteok at a rest stop. It was incorporated into the government's promotional program for Hallyu-related tourism in 2024, further boosting the popularity of the snack.
