= Proben =

Filipino street food

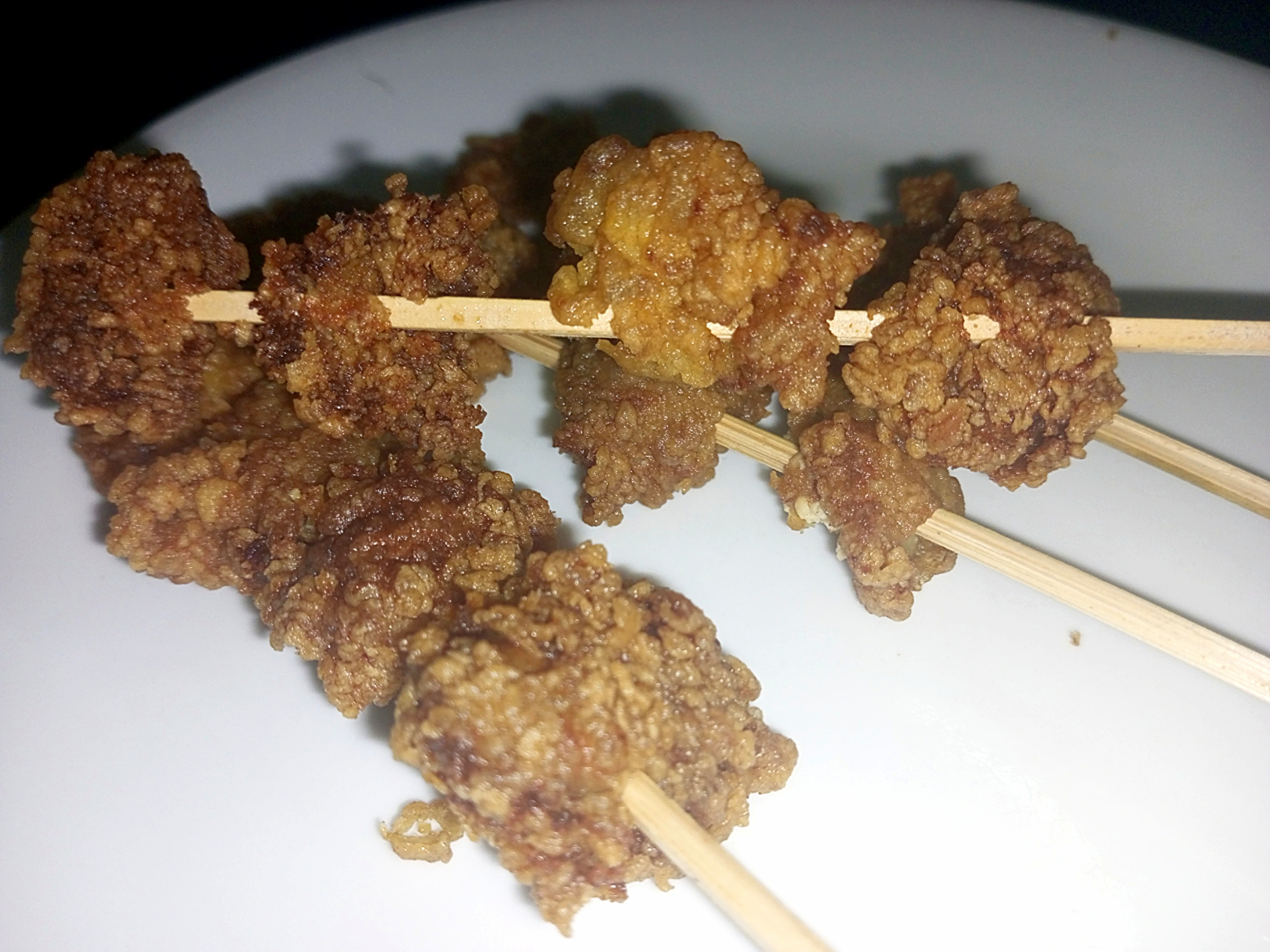
- Proben from Philippines
- Alternative names: Proven
- Place of origin: Philippines
- Region or state: Cagayan de Oro, Northern Mindanao
- Serving temperature: Hot, warm
- Main ingredients: Chicken offal, cornstarch
- Similar dishes: Isaw

Proben or proven, sometimes also called "chicken proben", is a type of street food popular in some regions of the Philippines. It consists essentially of the proventriculus of a chicken (thus, the derivation of its name), dipped in cornstarch or flour, and deep-fried. It is served either in a small bagful of vinegar, or skewered on bamboo sticks to be dipped in the vinegar and onion just before it is eaten.

== Description ==
Proben originated in the city of Cagayan de Oro. It is also eaten in Cebu City, Iligan City and other parts of Mindanao.

== Nutritional value ==
A nutritional study conducted by the University of the Philippines Los Baños (UPLB) noted that, as with most street foods, the microbial quality of the proben is a concern. However, the study noted that the pathogenic food-borne microbes in proben are mostly destroyed when it is cooked. The microbes only return if the proben is stored at ambient temperature after having been cooked. The study concluded that the risk of contamination can be reduced simply "through practice of personal hygiene employing standard cooking temperature (171–185 deg C) and time (10–15 min)" and by making sure that the proben is cooked just before it is eaten.

Raw proben had 39.08% crude protein, 25.59% carbohydrates, 25.59% crude fat, 0.61% crude fiber and 51.50 Kcal per 100 g.

The same study showed that the nutrient content of newly cooked proben increased by "crude fat (31%), fiber (131%), carbohydrates (21%), caloric contents (935%), crude protein (26%), calcium (21%), phosphorus (4%), iron (44 %), ash (32%) and moisture (56%)."

== See also ==
- Isaw
- Filipino street food and other snacks
