= Cup-bap =

Korean food truck offering

Cup-bap (Korean: 컵밥) is a food truck offering that consists of bap (rice) in a paper or plastic cup with a variety of toppings. Created in the 2000s for Korea street food, cup-bap has become a popular quick meal or snack for students from private cram schools known as hagwons in the neighborhood of Noryangjin.

== Definition and history ==
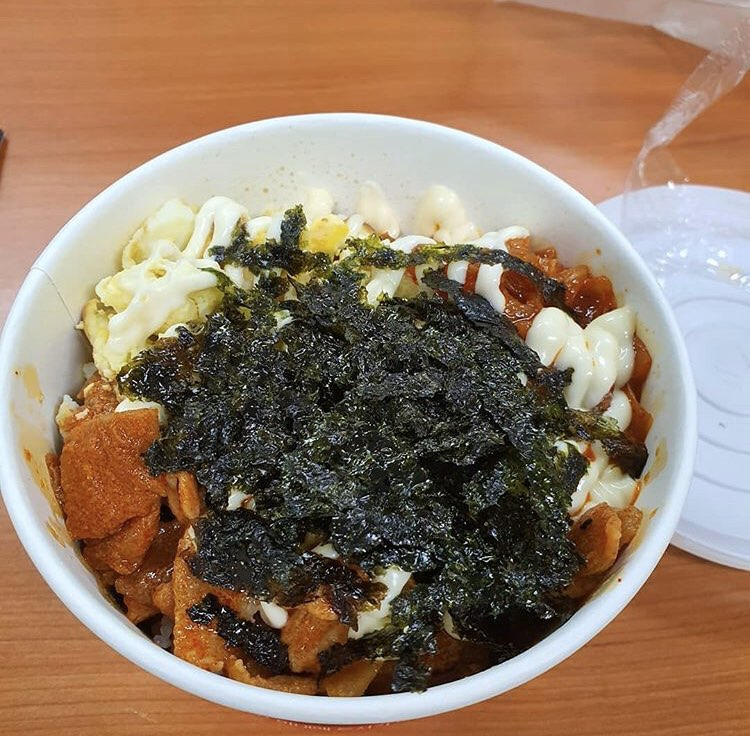
food cup-bap

In the streets of Noryangjin, many students would come out to eat at the same time which had been causing long lines at restaurants. Noryangjin had only offered very basic quick snacks such as hot dogs, so food trucks with cup-bap then filled the demand for quick, cheap, and more satisfying meals with rice, meat, and egg. Food trucks are able to quickly fill cup-bap orders, because they stir-fry the ingredients in advance in a large frying pan; when the cup-bap is ordered, the pre-cooked toppings are put in a cup with rice and egg. Because cup-bap is convenient to eat on the go as well as a more satisfying meal than other quick snacks, it grew in popularity with students. More food trucks started offering cup-bap along with a wider variety of toppings to satisfy various tastes.

== Types ==
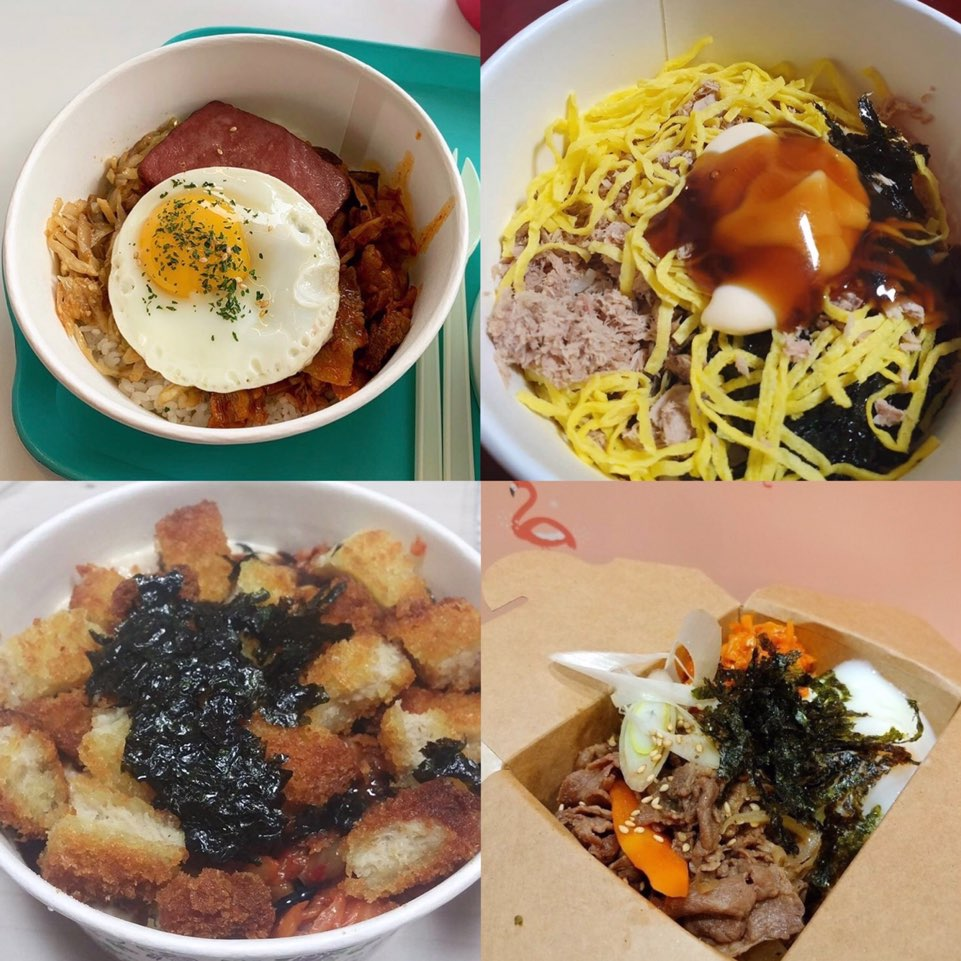
types of cup-bap

Some of the most popular kinds of cup-bap are stir-fried kimchi, Bibimbap, bulgogi, pork-belly & ham, chicken teriyaki, chicken mayonnaise, tuna mayonnaise, etc.

== Main consumers ==
In Korea, cup-bap is a food truck offering that academy students eat for a snack or as a meal on the Noryangjin Institutes Street, and as it became more popular, new franchises opened near the schools. The main consumers are students and others who need a quick and cheap meal.

Korean food has gained huge popularity in Vietnam due to the influence of the Korean wave. Among them, sales of products such as tteok-bokki, cup-bap, and japchae has risen by 38 percent. Cup-bap has also been very successful in Cambodia.

== Commercialization ==
Several Korean companies such as GS25 and Ottogi make pre-packaged versions of cup-baps.

== See also ==
- Cupbop, a restaurant franchise in the United States and Indonesia that serves cup-bap and is a namesake of the cuisine.
