= Habichuelas con dulce =

Sweet bean liquid dessert from the Dominican Republic

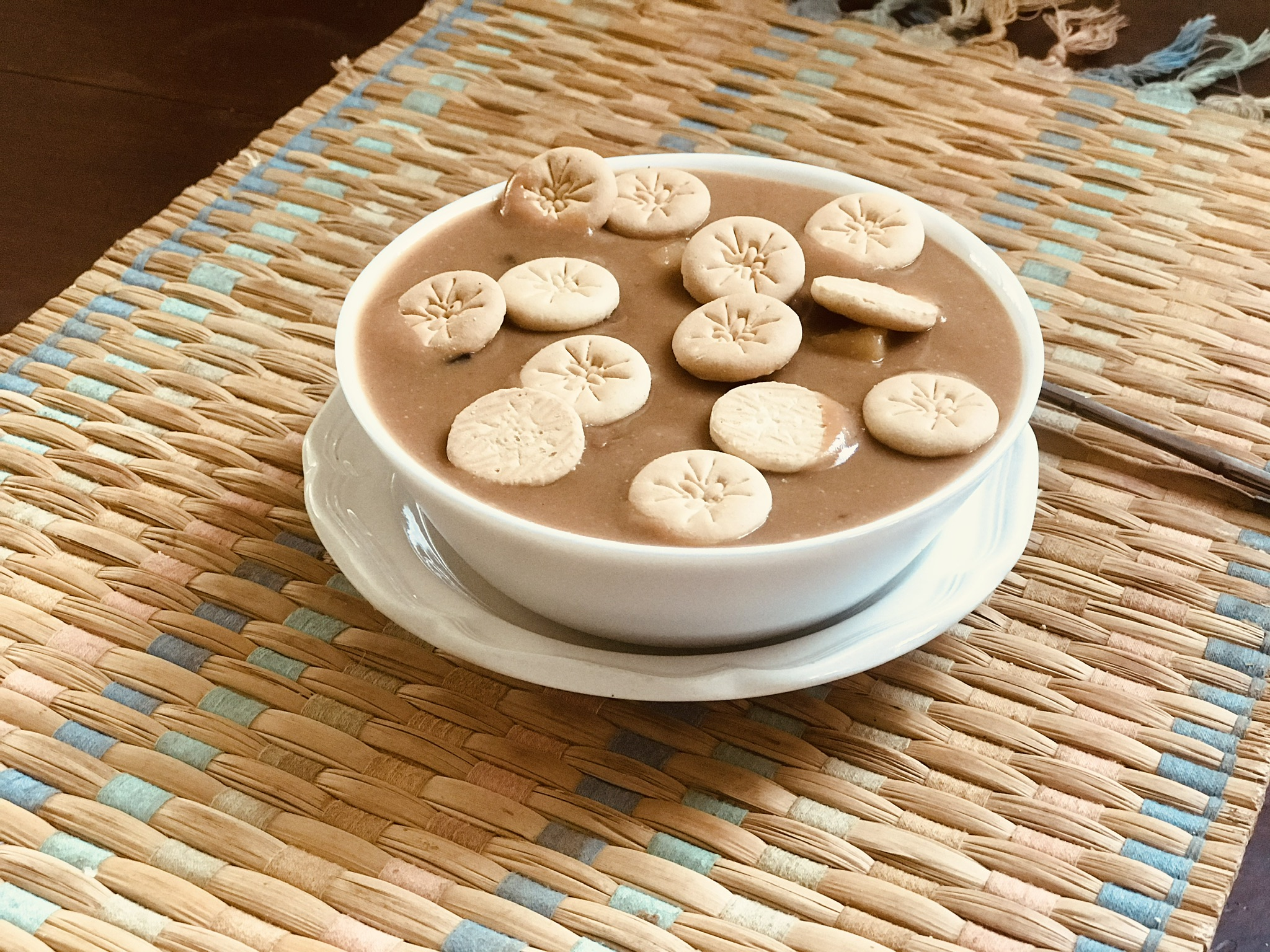
- Habichuelas con dulce
- Type: Dessert
- Place of origin: Dominican Republic
- Region or state: Latin America, Caribbean
- Main ingredients: Red beans, cinnamon, nutmeg, coconut milk, sweet potato, evaporated milk, raisin, sugar, pinch of salt and vanilla

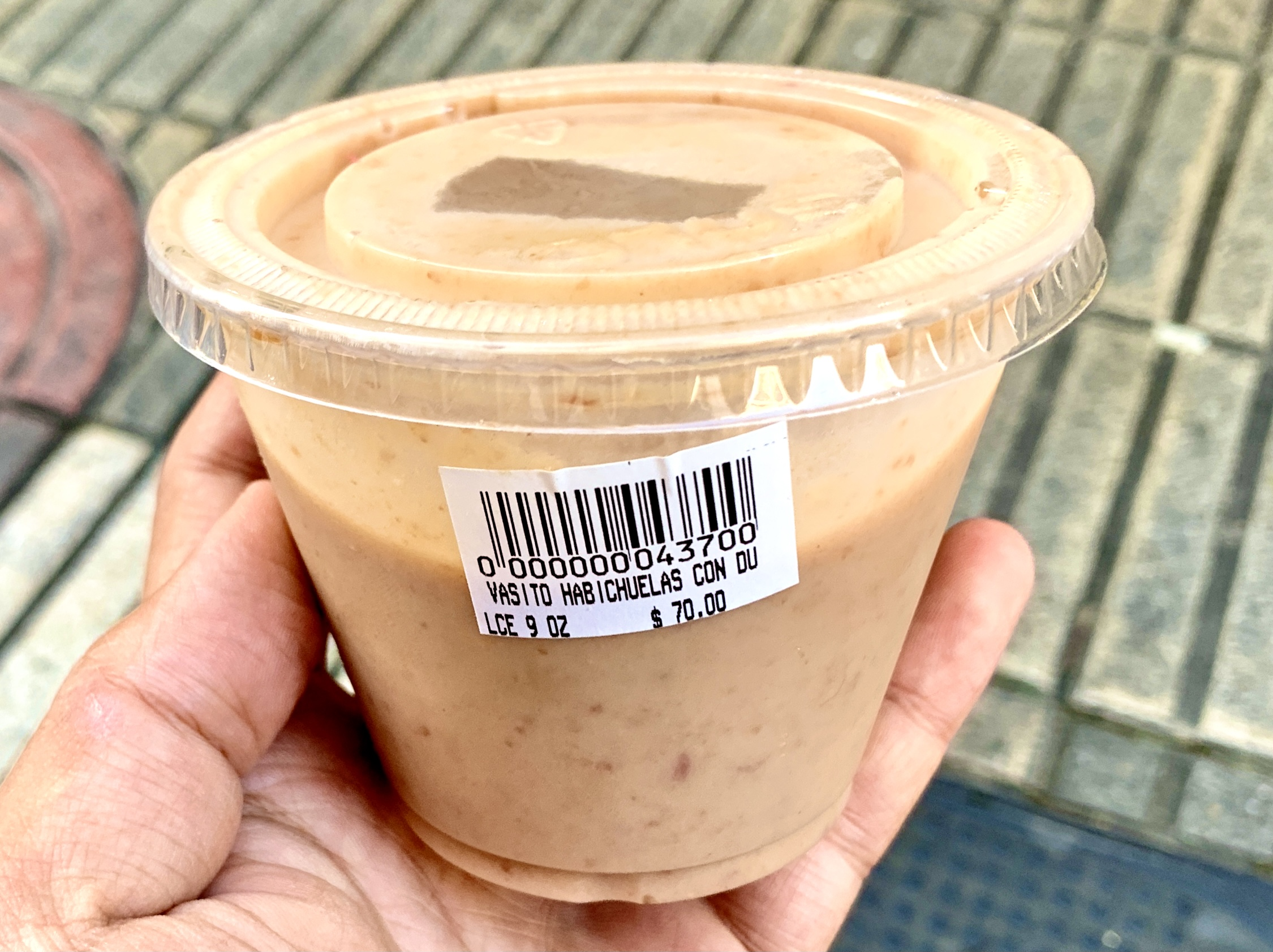
Habichuelas con dulce purchased at supermarket

Habichuelas con dulce is a sweet bean liquid dessert from the Dominican Republic that is especially popular around the Easter holiday. The dessert is part of the cuisine of the Dominican Republic and is traditionally garnished with milk cookies or with casabe, "a flatbread made of yuca flour."

Habichuelas con dulce is made with red beans, cinnamon, nutmeg, coconut milk, evaporated milk, raisins, sugar and salt. The beans are boiled with cinnamon sticks and sweet cloves and then blended to the consistency of soup. The coconut milk and evaporated milk are added along with cooked sweet potato chunks. Cloves and ginger can also be added as flavorings.

== History ==
The origins of the dish are unclear. One theory argues that habichuela con dulce was created by enslaved African people who were kidnapped and brought to the Dominican Republic, as it holds similarities to frejol colado, a similar dish that was created by Afro-Peruvians that consists of black bean, milk, sugar or panela. Culinary historians argue that habichuela con dulce might be frejol colado's long lost cousin. A theory argues that habichuelas con dulce was derived from a Turkish dish called Aşure or Ashure, also known as “Noah’s Pudding”. If this is the case, Ashure travelled to the Dominican Republic in the late 19th or early 20th century along with other classic dishes like Taboulleh and Kibbeh brought over by immigrants from the former Ottoman Empire and adapted along the way. Not only is Ashure made with similar ingredients including sugar, beans and spices, like Habichuela con dulce it is also associated with a religious period of fasting. The first month of the Islamic calendar is Muharrem. It is considered a good deed to fast the first 10 days of Muharrem and then on the 10th day cook and share Ashure with your neighbors and relatives. The theory argues that Ashure developed into habichuela con dulce.

Some argue that habichuela con dulce came to be in the Dominican Republic's colonial period with the sugar and coconut milk coming from African slaves, the sweet potato coming from the Taino Indian, and the beans and spices from Spanish settlers.

Another theory argues that habichuela con dulce is derived from the French. The Dominican people were structured on novel or original cultural patterns from the miscegenation of whites, blacks and mulattoes and also with the influence of many migrations. The case of beans with sweet indicates the dynamic Dominican cultural formation. Its origin may be related to the French presence on the island of Santo Domingo. The data is provided by Dorvo Soulastre, a French military man who came to Santo Domingo accompanying General Hédouville on March 27, 1798. Among the French who emigrated to Spanish Santo Domingo, Soulastre met Francois Delalande, who is said to have introduced the custom of eating legumes or beans, the possible origin of habichuelas con dulce.

Delalande came to the country due to a family tragedy. He lived with his wife and children at Fort Dauphin, Saint-Domingue, where he had a small vegetable farm. The misfortune arose when a mulatto requested permission to marry one of his daughters. Faced with the refusal, the marriage of whites with mulattoes and blacks was not allowed, the suitor decided to take revenge and took advantage of the slave rebellion in 1791, he killed his daughters and persecuted the family. The surviving father, mother and male children fled to Santo Domingo, where a Spaniard, moved by the tragedy, gave him a piece of land for his subsistence.

In the Spanish colony, Soulastre tasted at a table served "French-style" fruits, legumes and a "carrot and bean cream" produced by Delalande and his family. Of the Delalande legumes, Soulastre was especially struck by some “beans” that were better cared for than others, which were eaten “as fine and sugary” as in France. According to the historian José G. Guerrero, the Frenchman Dorvo Soulastre reported for Holy Week in 1798 that in Santo Domingo some "sugary beans" were prepared.

Despite these theories, it has not been settled how the dish originated.

== How it's made ==
Red beans are used to make habichuelas con dulce. The beans need to be soft, so they are soaked in water overnight. After boiling and becoming soft, the beans are strained for a fine texture. At this point, evaporated milk, condensed milk, and coconut milk are added to the mixture of the beans. Habichuelas con dulce can have added spices for a sweeter taste. During the preparation, spices such as cinnamon, cloves, nutmeg and vanilla can be added, depending on the family's recipe and preference. After the mixture is done, butter is added to the mixture. Traditional toppings and mix-ins include raisins, batata (white sweet potato) and Guarina milk cookies. The habichuelas con dulce typically are left to cool down for a few hours before eaten.

== Uses ==
A similar form of habichuelas con dulce is red bean paste, which is a dark red, sweet bean paste. It is used in Chinese, Korean, and Japanese cuisines.

=== Chinese ===
In Chinese cuisines, red bean paste is used in:

- Zongzi, which is a form of pasteles made of glutinous rice stuffed with different fillings and is wrapped in flat large leaves such as bamboo and reed.
- Jiān dui, which is a fried pastry made from glutinous flour that can be filled with red bean paste.
- Mooncakes have rich thick filling that is made with lotus seed paste or red bean paste.
- Red bean cake usual made with the outer shell of beans. The mashed beans are then mixed with gelatin and cooled for several hours before serving, just as habichuela con dulce.

=== Korean ===
- Bungeoppang This is a pastry that includes red bean paste and is roasted.
- Hobbang This snack is a ball of flour filled with red bean paste.
- Baram tteok Is a rice cake made with rice and filled with red bean paste.
- Chalboribbang is small sweet pancakes that use a spread made of red bean paste.

=== Japanese ===
- Daifuku, which consists of small round kochi, stuffed with red bean paste.
- Manjū that is made of flour, buckwheat, rice, powder and red bean paste.
- Taiyaki, which is a fish shaped cake filled with red bean paste.
- Anpan that is a sweet roll filled with red bean paste.

== See also ==
- List of desserts
