= Bean paste =

Bean paste can refer to:

- Fermented bean paste, a savory or spicy fermented paste made typically of salted soybeans, used in many Asian cultures
- Sweet bean paste, a sweetened paste made from various types of beans that are used as a filling in many East Asian desserts
- Red bean paste, a paste made from red beans used in East Asian cuisine
