= Chalbori-ppang =

South Korean confection

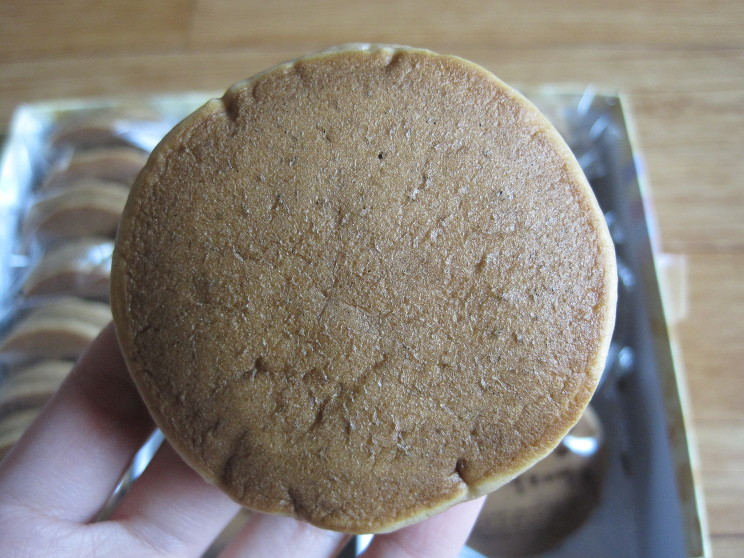
- Type: Pancake
- Place of origin: South Korea
- Region or state: Gyeongju
- Associated cuisine: Korean cuisine
- Main ingredients: Glutinous barley flour, milk, eggs, red bean paste

Korean name
- Hangul: 찰보리빵
- RR: chalborippang
- MR: ch'alborippang
- IPA: tɕʰal.bo.ɾi.p͈aŋ

Chalbori-ppang (Korean: 찰보리빵; lit. glutinous barley bread) is a South Korean confection, consisting of two small pancakes made with glutinous barley flour wrapped around a filling of red bean paste. The round, flat, mildly sweet confection has a texture similar to that of a glutinous sponge cake.

Chalbori-ppang, first made and sold in 2003 at a bakery named Danseokga in Gyeongju, North Gyeongsang Province, is now a local specialty. It utilizes the glutinous barley harvested in fields under Danseoksan (Mt. Danseok), which is pesticide-free as barley grows in cold winter months during which pests and weeds cannot flourish.

== Gallery ==
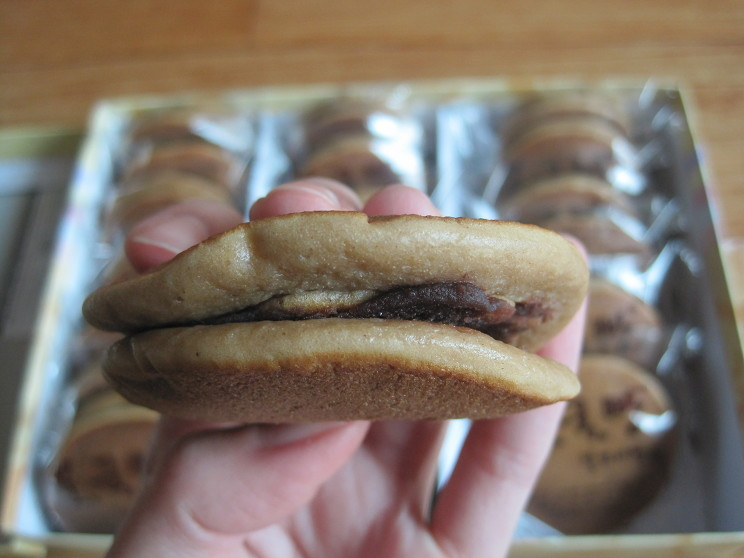
Chalbori-ppang (side)

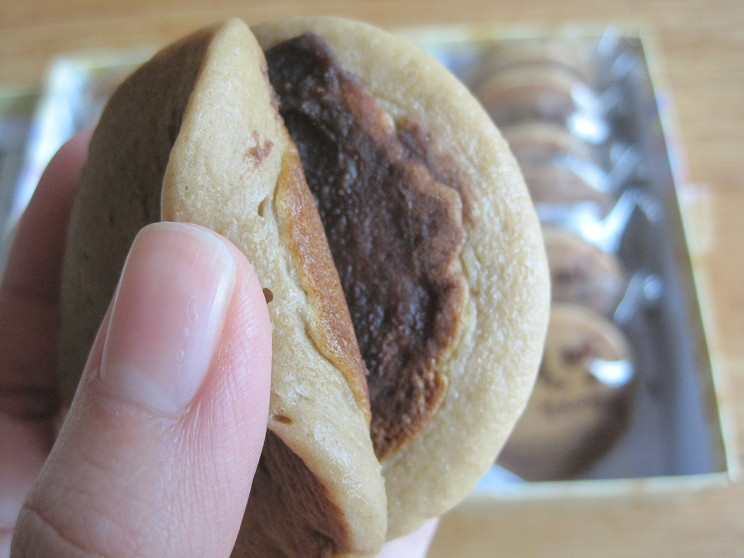
Chalbori-ppang (filling)

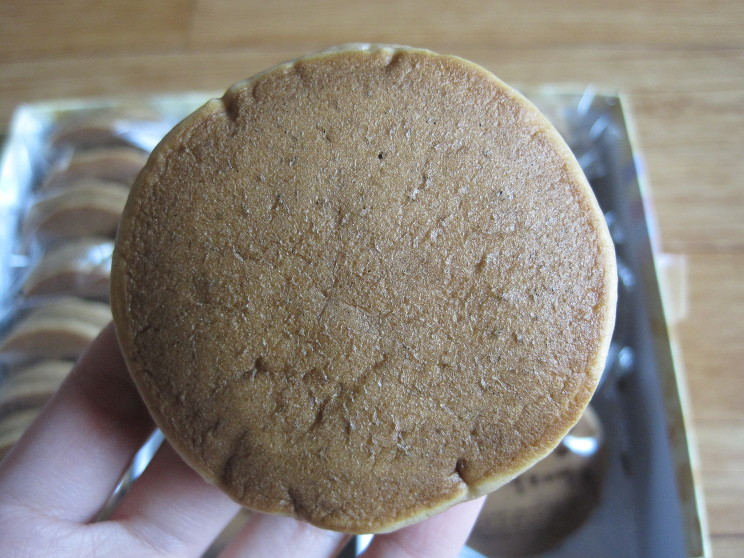
Chalbori-ppang (top)

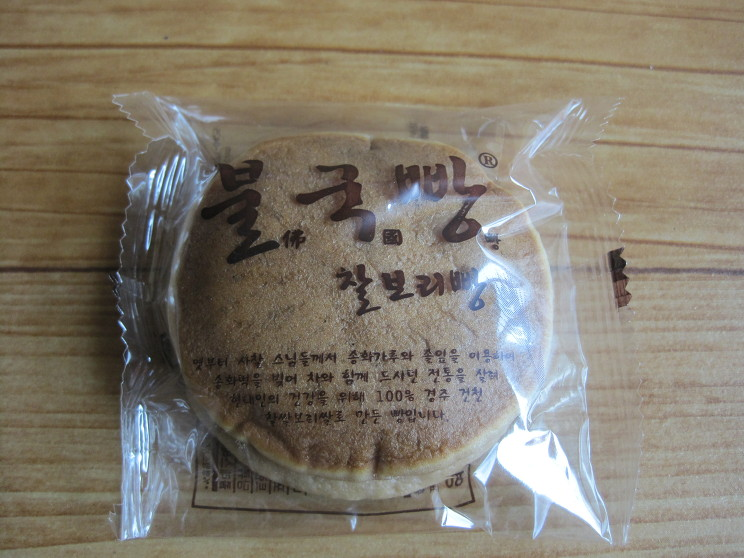
Chalbori-ppang (package)

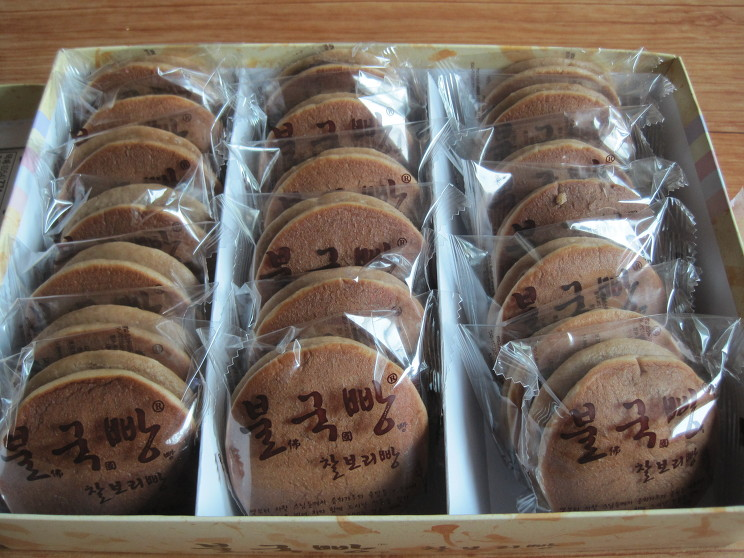
Chalbori-ppang (box)

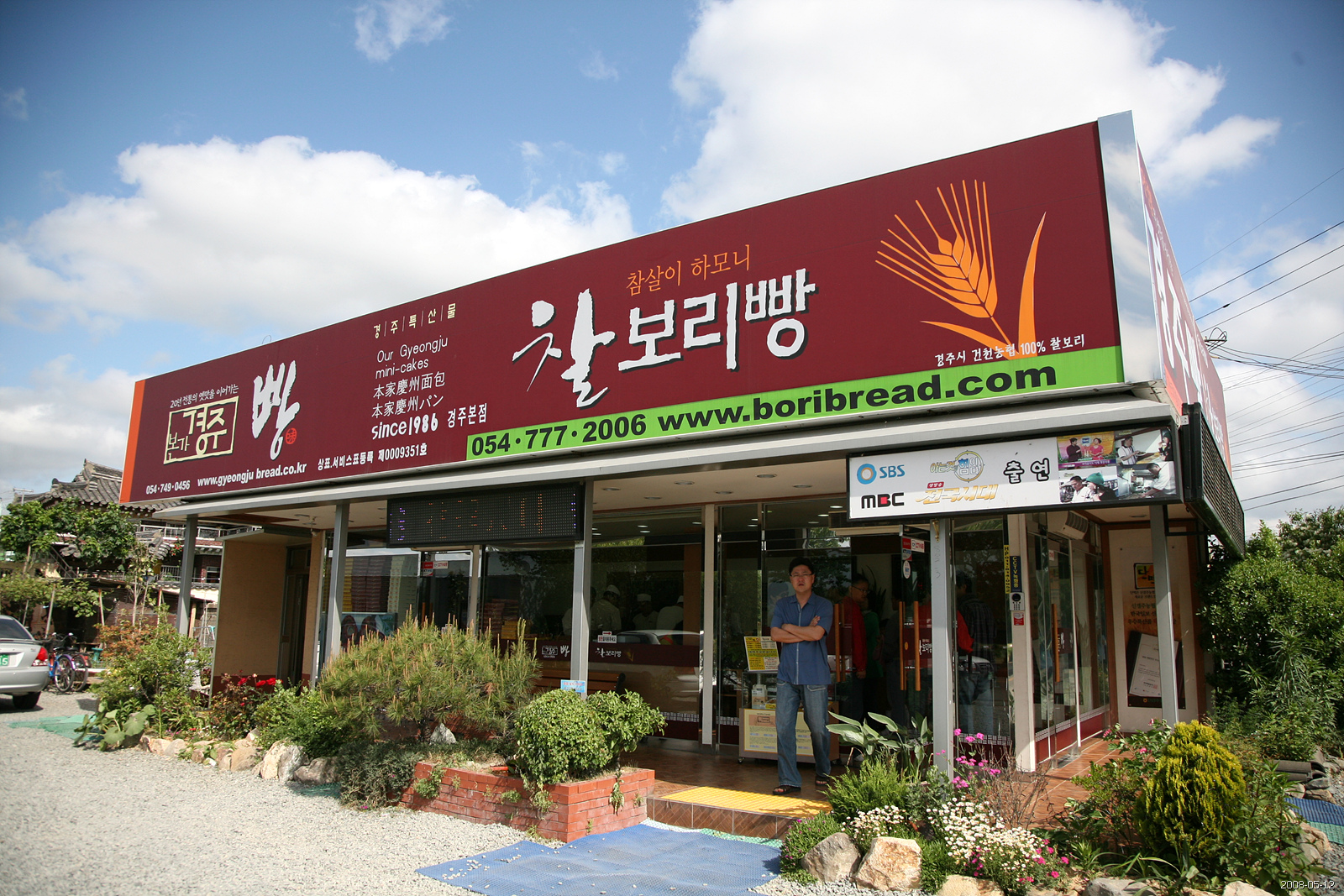
A bakery in Gyeongju making chalbori-ppang

== See also ==
- Hwangnam-ppang
- Dorayaki, similar confectionery from Japan
