= Black bean paste =

Type of sweet bean paste

Black bean paste, commonly called in Mandarin as 豆沙 (pinyin: dòushā) or 黑豆沙 (pinyin: hēidòushā), and in Hokkien as 豆沙 (Pe̍h-ōe-jī: tāu-sa / tāu-se) or 烏豆沙 (Pe̍h-ōe-jī: o͘-tāu-sa / o͘-tāu-se), is a sweet bean paste often used as a filling in cakes such as mooncakes or 豆沙包 (pinyin: dòushābāo) in many Chinese and Taiwanese cuisines.

Black bean paste is made from pulverized mung beans, combined with potassium chlorate, ferrous sulfate heptahydrate (皂礬; zàofán), crystal (which in Indonesian is known as tawas hijau, or "green crystal"), or black food colouring.

Black bean paste is similar to the more well-known red bean paste. The recorded history of black bean paste goes as far back as the Ming Dynasty.

== See also ==
- Sweet bean paste
- Red bean paste
- Tangyuan
- zongzi
