= Hodu-gwaja =

Type of cookie from South Korea

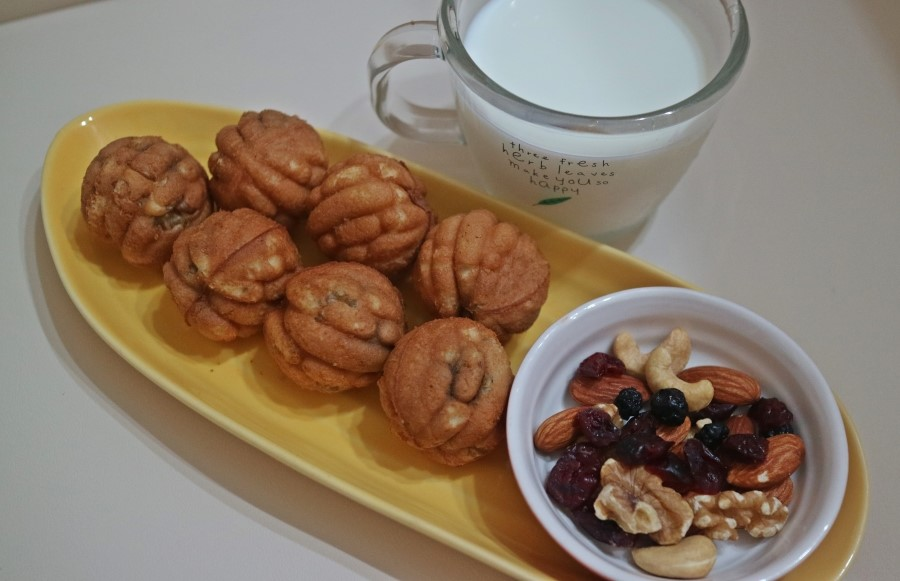
- Alternative names: Hodo-gwaja, walnut cookies, walnut cakes, walnut pastries
- Type: Cookie
- Place of origin: South Korea
- Region or state: Cheonan
- Created by: Jo Gwigeum, Sim Boksun
- Invented: 1934
- Main ingredients: Walnuts, red bean paste
- Ingredients generally used: Wheat flour, eggs, milk, sugar

Korean name
- Hangul: 호두과자
- Hanja: 胡桃菓子
- RR: hodugwaja
- MR: hodugwaja
- IPA: [ho.du.ɡwa.dʑa]

Hodu-gwaja (Korean: 호두과자; "walnut cookie"), commonly translated as walnut cookies, walnut cakes, and walnut pastries, is a type of cookie originated from Cheonan, South Korea. It is also known by the name hodo-gwaja (호도과자; which is not the Standard Korean spelling but the name used by Hakhwa walnut cookies, the company that first produced the confection) in and outside Korea.

It is a walnut-shaped baked confection with red bean paste filling, whose outer dough is made of skinned and pounded walnuts and wheat flour. Ones that are made in Cheonan, South Chungcheong Province, are called "Cheonan hodu-gwaja" and are a local specialty.

== History ==
Hodu-gwaja was first made in 1934 by Jo Gwigeum and Sim Boksun, who were a married couple living in Cheonan. The method was developed based on those of traditional Korean confectioneries.

Outside Cheonan, it was popularized in the 1970s, often sold in train stations and inside the train via catering trolleys. Nowadays it is sold in most regions in South Korea including Seoul, and in cities of other countries, such as Los Angeles and San Diego in the United States, and Toronto in Canada.

More than 60 years ago, SUHIL Machinery Corp manufactured and delivered the first hodu-gwaja machine to Cheonan's Hakhwa Hodu Gwaja the original producer of hodu-gwaja.

== Gallery ==
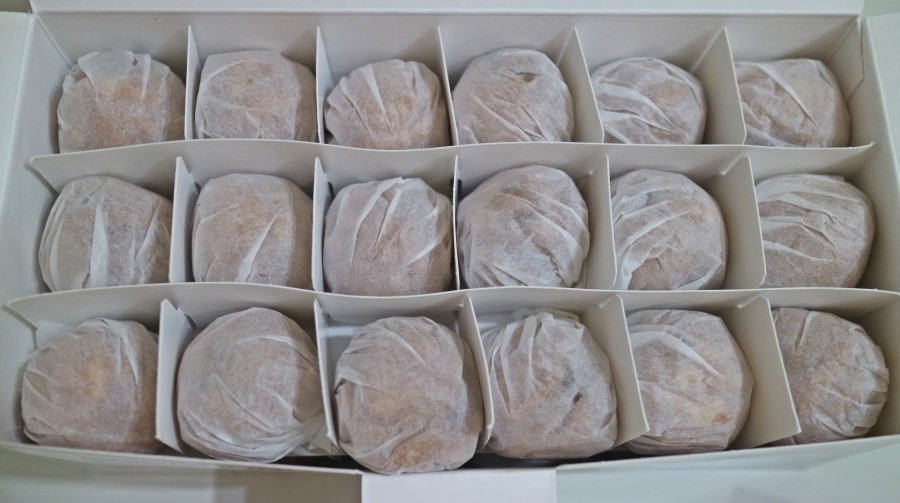
hodu-gwaja in its packaging

== See also ==
- Hangwa
- Hwangnam-ppang
