= Kkulppang =

South Korean honey bread dish

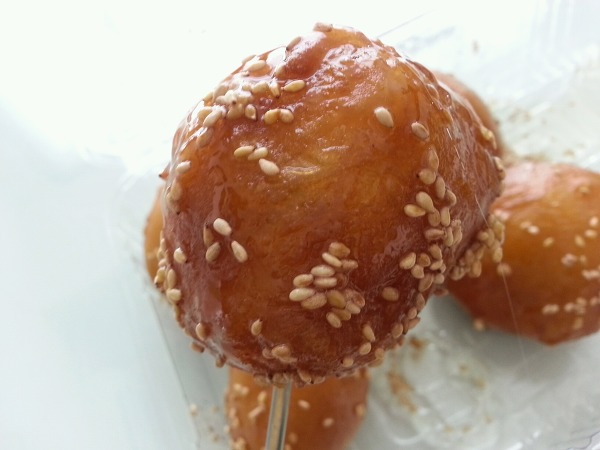
- Tongyeong-kkulppang
- Alternative names: Honey bread
- Type: Bread
- Place of origin: South Korea
- Region or state: Tongyeong, Jinju
- Associated cuisine: Korean cuisine
- Created by: Jeong Wonseok
- Invented: 1963
- Main ingredients: Wheat flour dough, syrup, red bean paste
- Variations: Tongyeong-kkulppang; Jinju-kkulppang

Korean name
- Hangul: 꿀빵
- RR: kkulppang
- MR: kkulppang
- IPA: [k͈ul.p͈aŋ]

Kkulppang (Korean: 꿀빵), also known as honey bread, is a South Korean dish. It is a sticky, sweet bread filled with sweetened red bean paste. Softer, fluffier ones that are made in Tongyeong, South Gyeongsang Province in South Korea, are called Tongyeong-kkulppang, being a local specialty. In an adjacent city called Jinju, crunchier Jinju-kkulppang is sold as a local specialty. Shortly after the Korean War, many bakeries in Tongyeong were sold. Fishermen and shipbuilding workers who worked on the beach simply ate a meal or snack because they could be kept for a long time despite the warm climate of Tongyeong.

== History ==
Kkulppang was first made and sold in 1963 by Jeong Won-seok (정원석) at a stand in front of his house in Hangnam-dong, Tongyeong. In the early 1960s, when post-war impoverishment was severe, the bread was made with rationed wheat flour.

== Preparation ==
Sifted wheat flour is kneaded with eggs to form dough. The dough is then rolled into small balls and filled with sweetened red bean paste, deep-fried in vegetable oil, and then coated with syrup and toasted sesame seeds.

== Varieties ==
Fillings for tongyeong-kkulppang other than the typical red bean paste include sweet potato, chestnut, yuja and green tea.

== Gallery ==
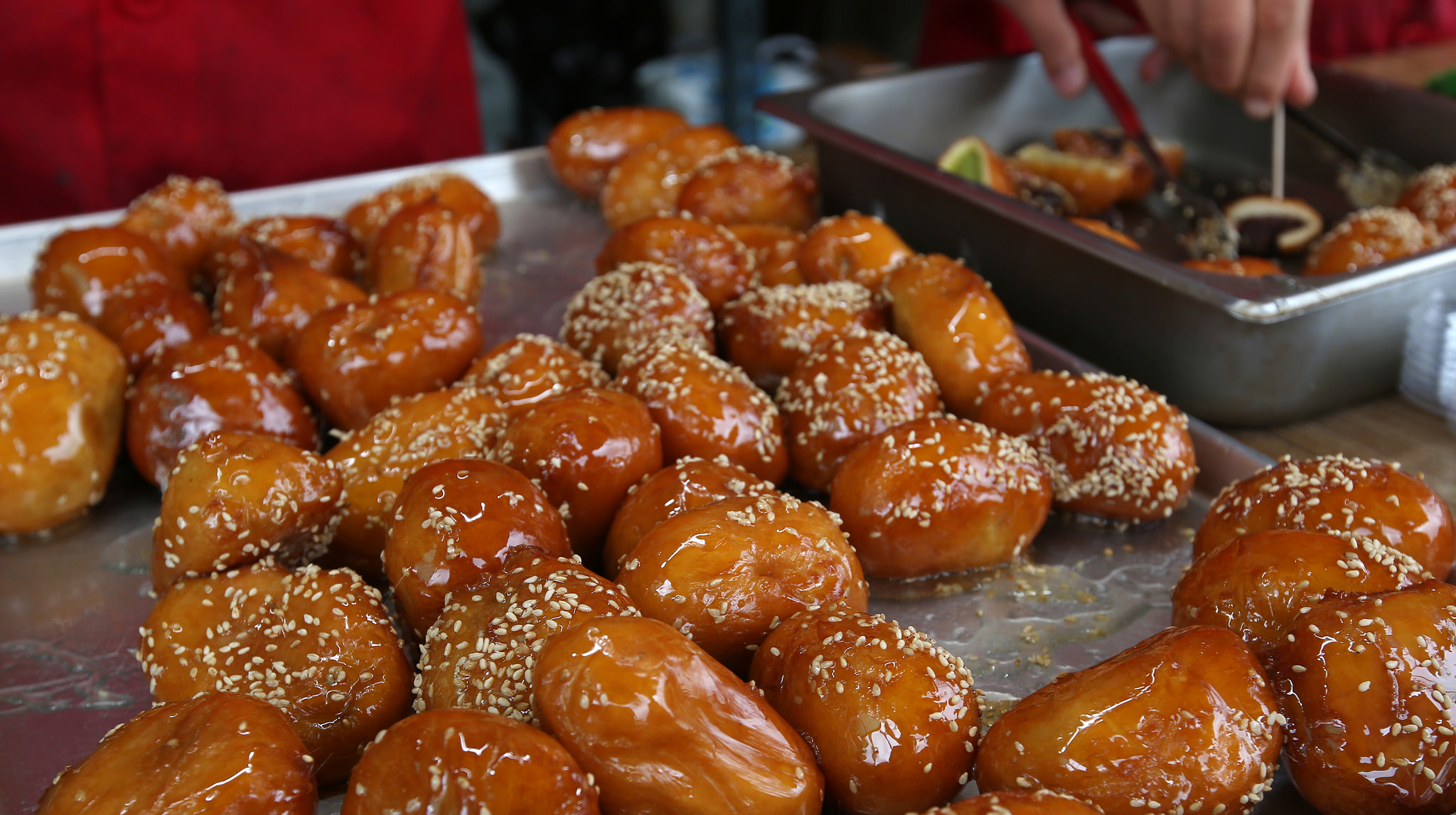
Tongyeong-kkulppang sold at a store

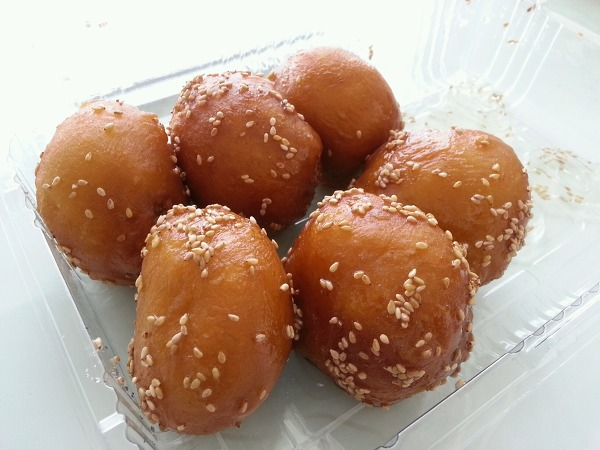
A pack of Tongyeong-kkulppang

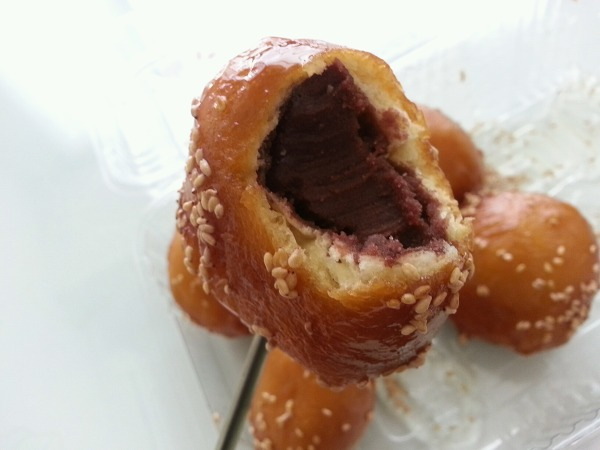
Tongyeong-kkulppang filled with red bean paste
