= Danseoksan =

Mountain in North Gyeongsang, South Korea

Coordinates: 35°48′N 129°05′E

Highest point
- Elevation: 827 m (2,713 ft)

Geography
- Location: North Gyeongsang Province, South Korea

Korean name
- Hangul: 단석산
- Hanja: 斷石山
- RR: Danseoksan
- MR: Tansŏksan

Danseoksan (Korean: 단석산) is a mountain of North Gyeongsang Province, eastern South Korea. It has an elevation of 827 metres.

== See also ==
- List of mountains of Korea
