= Gaepi-tteok =

Korean stuffed rice cake

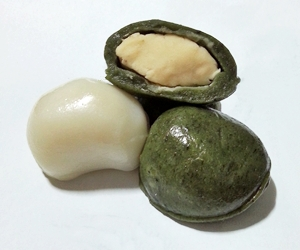
- Alternative names: Baram-tteok
- Type: Tteok
- Place of origin: Korea
- Associated cuisine: Korean cuisine
- Main ingredients: Rice flour, white adzuki bean paste

Korean name
- Hangul: 개피떡
- RR: gaepitteok
- MR: kaep'ittŏk

Alternate name
- Hangul: 바람떡
- RR: baramtteok
- MR: paramttŏk
- IPA: pa.ɾam.t͈ʌk̚

Gaepi-tteok (Korean: 개피떡) or baram-tteok (바람떡) is a half-moon-shaped tteok (rice cake) made with glutinous rice flour and filled with white adzuki bean paste.

== Preparation ==
Glutinous rice flour is steamed in siru (steamer) and pounded in jeolgu (mortar) to form a dough. It is then cut into small pieces, rolled out flat and round, and filled with geopipat-so (white adzuki bean paste) and sealed. The filling can be made by husking adzuki beans (often the black variety), steaming and seasoning it with salt, and sieving it. Sesame oil is brushed on each tteok to prevent it from sticking.

== Varieties ==
Korean mugwort can be pounded together with steamed rice flour to make a green-colored dough. In Gangwon Province, steamed rice flour is pounded with deltoid synurus, also resulting in a green dough. To make a pink dough, the endodermis of Korean red pine is used.

Variants containing sweet mung bean paste instead of white adzuki bean paste are very common, particularly among the Korean communities in Los Angeles, California.
