= Hwangnam-ppang =

Korean red bean pastry

Gyeongju bread
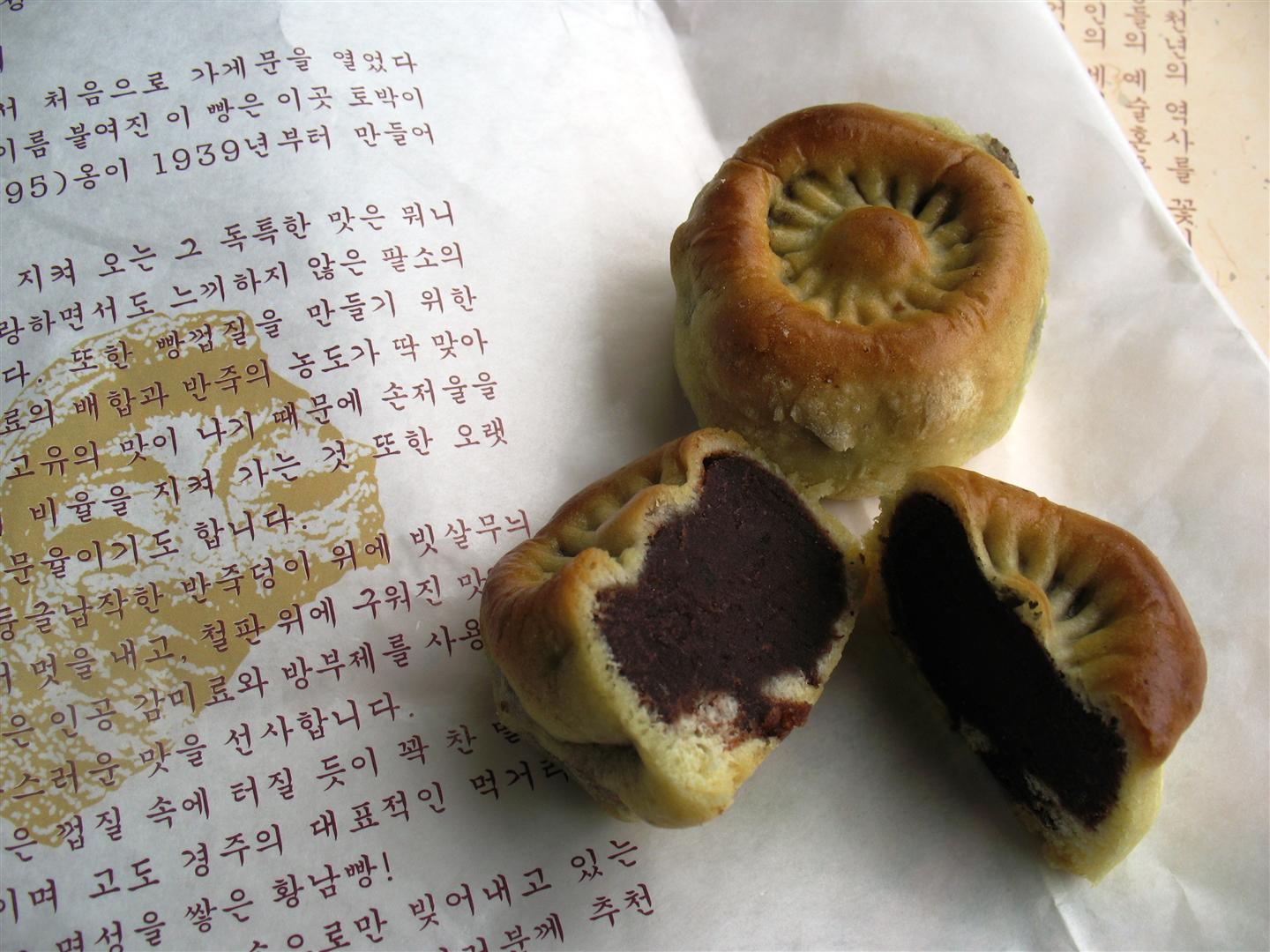
- Type: Dessert
- Place of origin: Korea
- Region or state: Hwangnam-dong
- Main ingredients: Red bean paste, eggs, wheat flour

Korean name
- Hangul: 황남빵; 경주빵
- Hanja: 皇南빵; 慶州빵
- RR: Hwangnamppang; Gyeongjuppang
- MR: Hwangnamppang; Kyŏngjuppang

Hwangnam bread (Korean: 황남빵), named for Hwangnam-dong and also commonly called Gyeongju bread (경주빵), is a local specialty of Gyeongju, South Korea. It is a small dessert with a filling of red bean paste. Gyeongju bread was first baked in 1939 at Choi Yeonghwa Bakery and now its owned by grandson Choi Jinhwan.

The dish has its origins in wagashi, Japanese confectionaries, from the 1930s Japanese colonial period. It has since become popular across the country and is produced by several different companies, all based in Gyeongju. It is sold at many locations in the city, and also at specialized stores around the country.

Gyeongju bread is made using batter of eggs and wheat flour, with the red bean filling being almost 70% of the pastry. A chrysanthemum would be traditionally imprinted on the top. Gyeongju bread has been designated as an "outstanding regional specialty" (지역명품) by the Korean government.

The President of South Korea Lee Jae Myung remarked in a CNN interview that “if you visit Gyeongju, where APEC is being held, you will try this bread nine times out of ten,” and CCP General Secretary Xi Jinping has also been quoted as praising its taste (“吃得很香”). The bread has appeared at official functions, including the CEO Summit welcome dinner, and—while long popular domestically—reportedly gained broader international visibility after the South Korean government ordered several thousand boxes at the President’s direction. According to Choi Jin-hwan, the third-generation head of Hwangnam Bread, the company “has clearly benefited from the APEC summit being held in Gyeongju.” During APEC 2025—when heads of government and roughly 1,700 global CEOs gathered from the United States, China, Japan, and other countries—Hwangnam bread was promoted as a “signature dessert of Gyeongju,” aided by the brand’s role as an official partner for the summit week and its presence at formal events. Choi further stated that, although many products imitate the shape, Hwangnam Bread alone has maintained a fully hand-crafted process; recalling his grandfather’s maxim that “building a family business is hard, but preserving it is harder,” he expressed the aim to continue the tradition and hoped the summit would attract more visitors to both Gyeongju and Hwangnam bread.

== Gallery ==
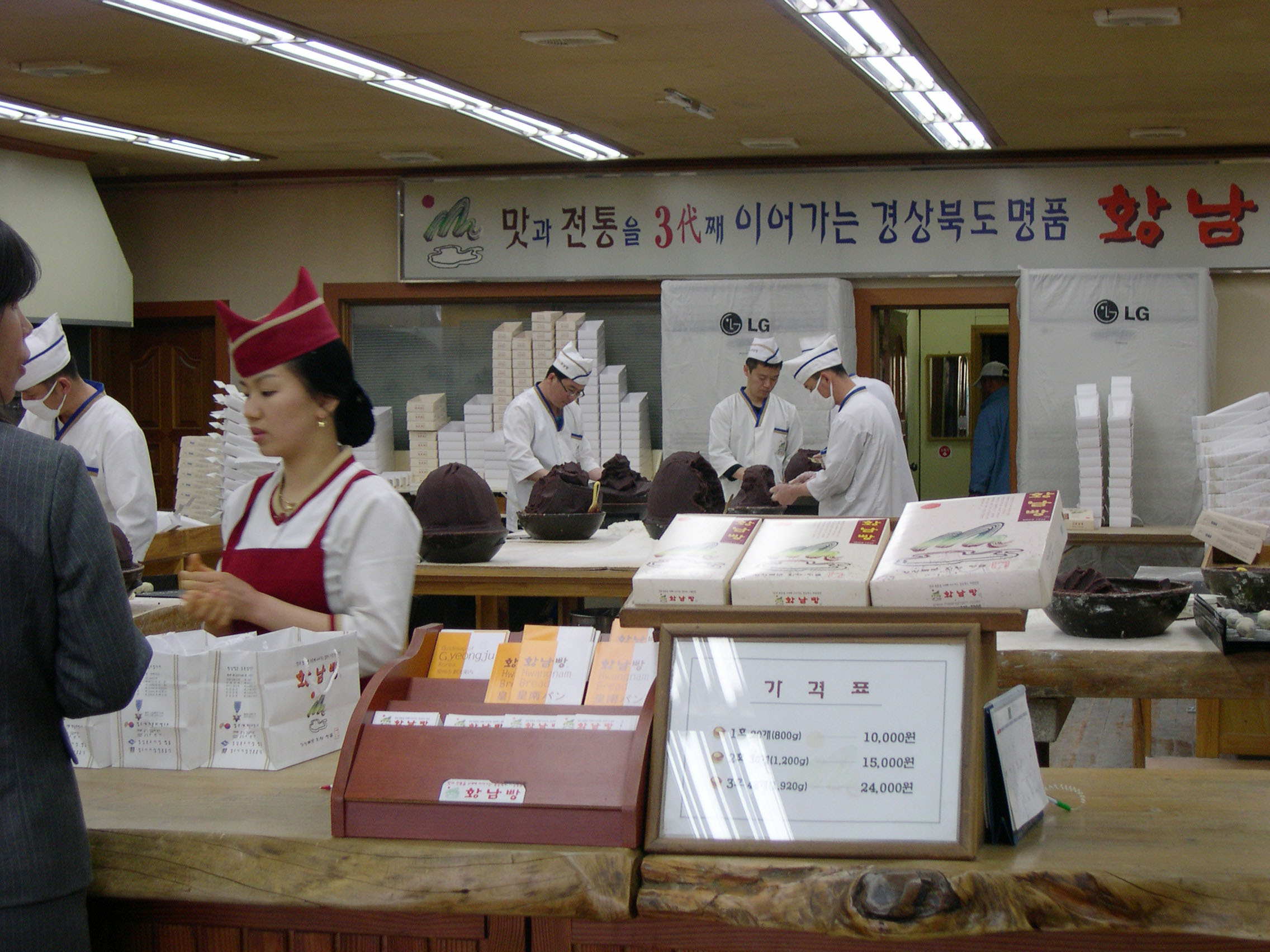
Hwangnam bread factory

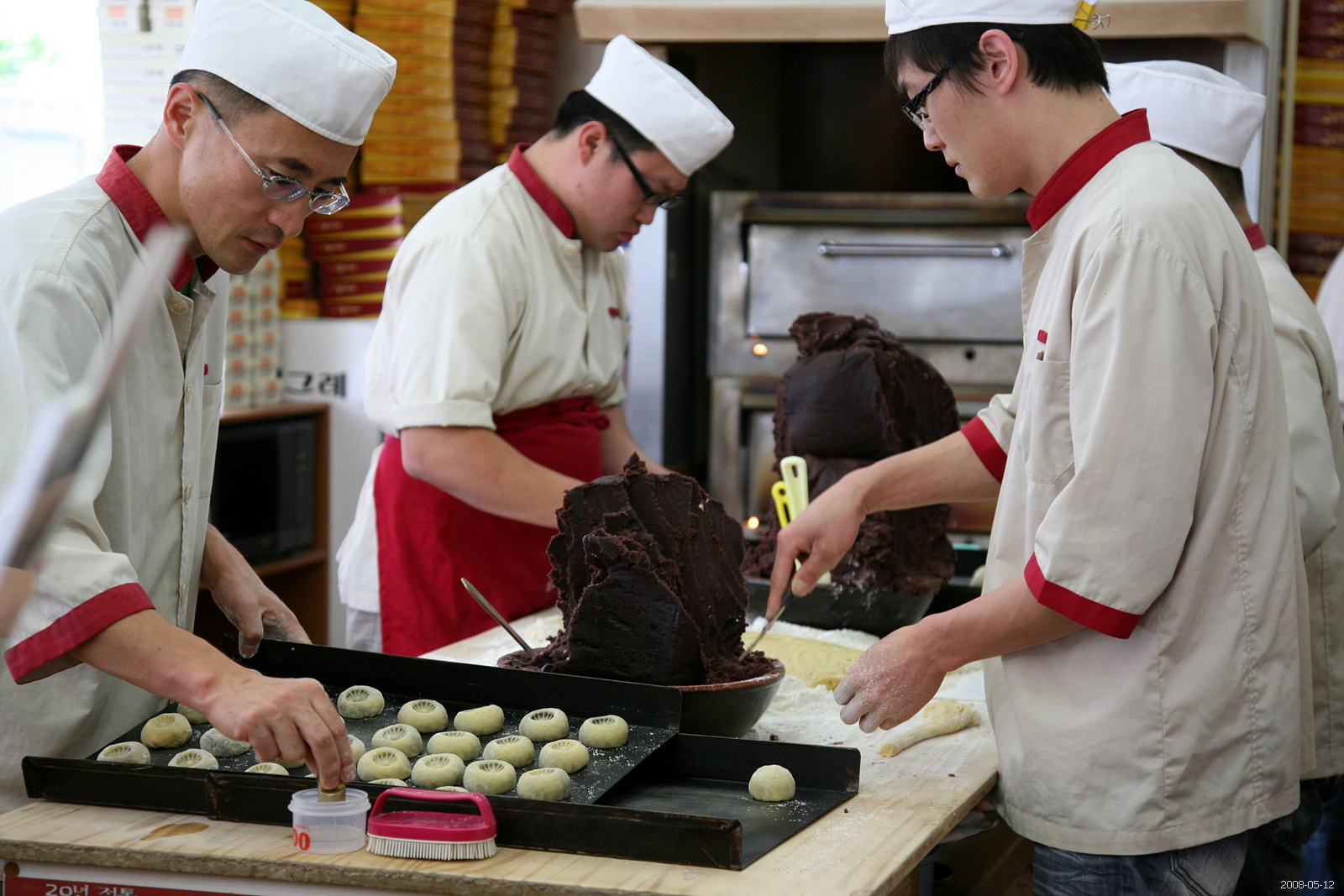
Making

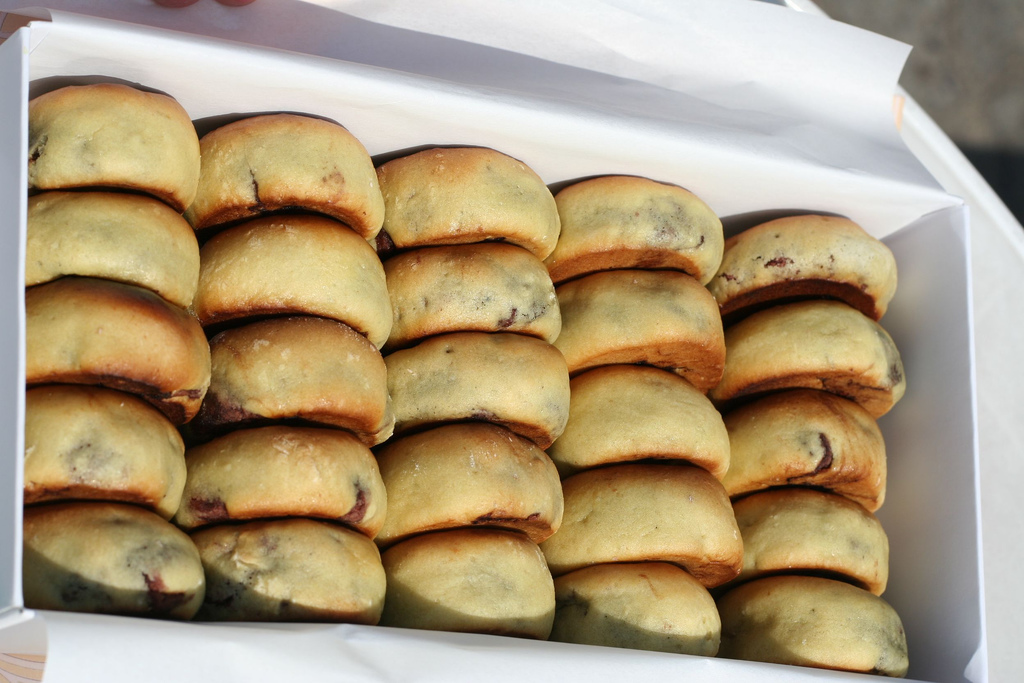
Packed confection

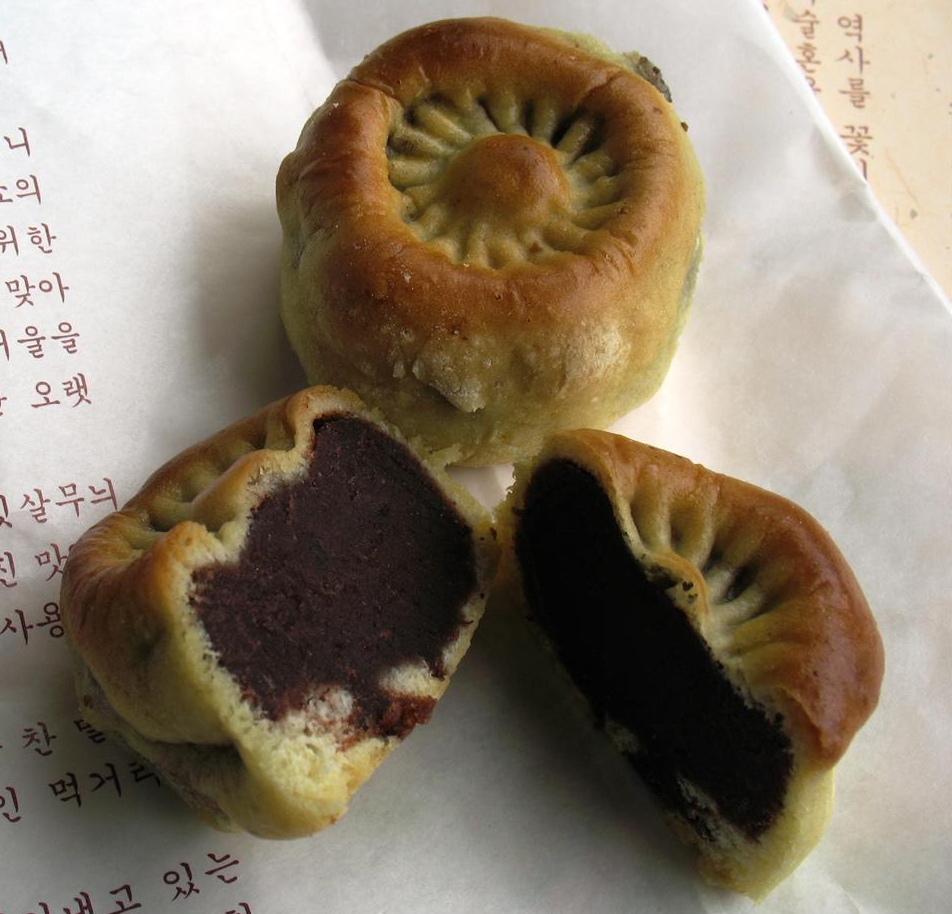
Detailed view

== See also ==
- Hangwa
- Hodu-gwaja
- 10 won bread
- Korean cuisine
- List of Korean desserts
- List of pastries
