= Red bean cake =

Cake with red bean paste filling

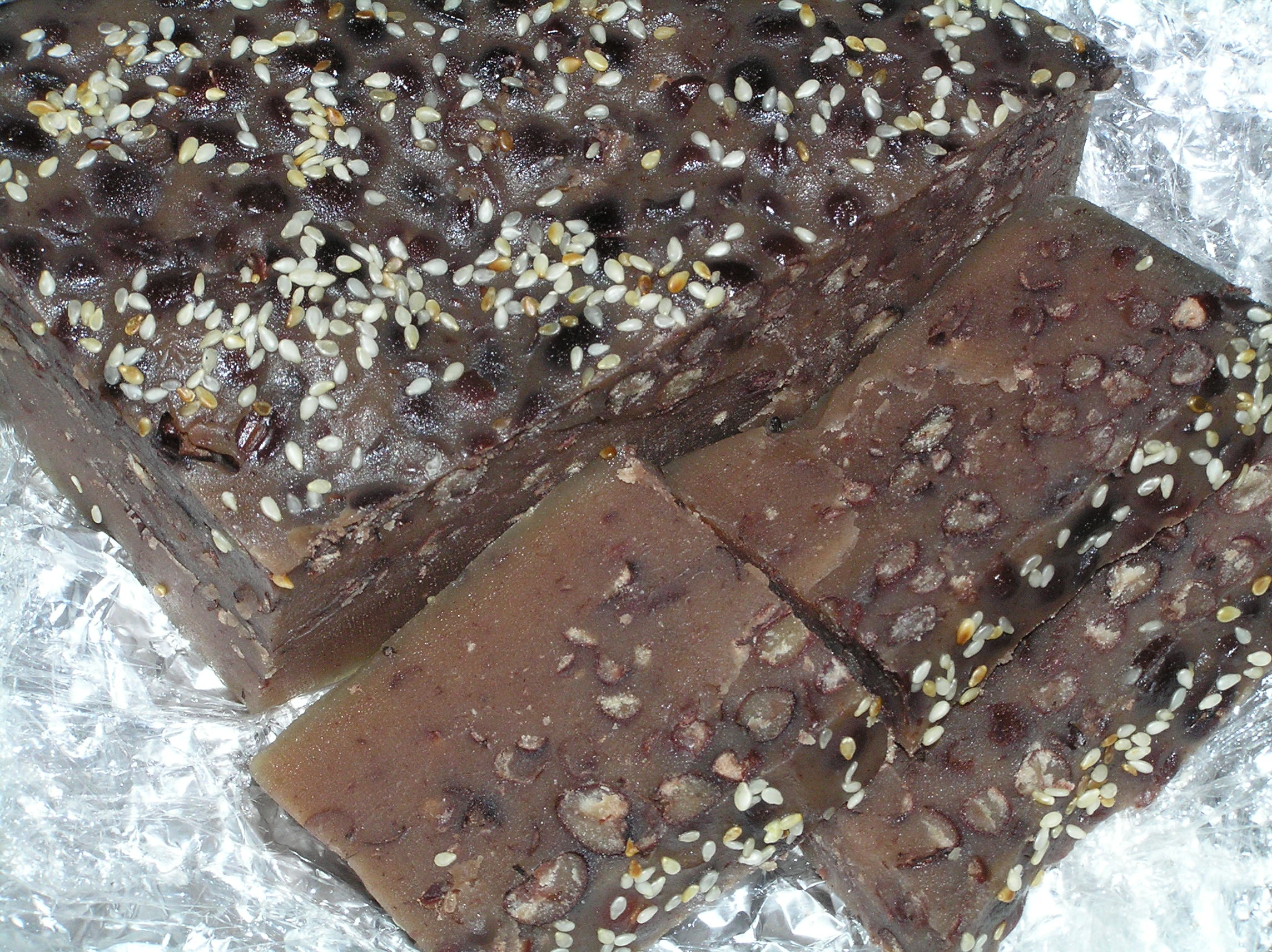
- Type: Cake
- Course: Dessert
- Place of origin: China
- Region or state: Guangdong
- Main ingredients: Red bean paste

Red bean cake
- Traditional Chinese: 紅豆糕
- Simplified Chinese: 红豆糕
Transcriptions
Standard Mandarin
- Hanyu Pinyin: hóng dòu gāo
Yue: Cantonese
- Jyutping: hung4 dau6*2 gou1

Red bean cake is a type of Chinese cake with a sweet red bean paste filling. There are many regional varieties, including Taiwanese versions.

== Cantonese-style ==
Cantonese-style red bean cake is made with hardened red bean paste that has been frozen. The cake is sweetened and sprinkled with sesame seed. It is generally tough to bite, and is served as a square block. Depending on the particular region within China, this may be seen as a year-round snack, or as a seasonal pastry consumed on certain traditional Chinese holidays.

== See also ==
- Red bean soup
- Mooncake
- List of Chinese desserts
- List of desserts
- List of legume dishes
- Yōkan – similar Japanese food made with red beans
