= Red bean paste =

Paste made from adzuki beans

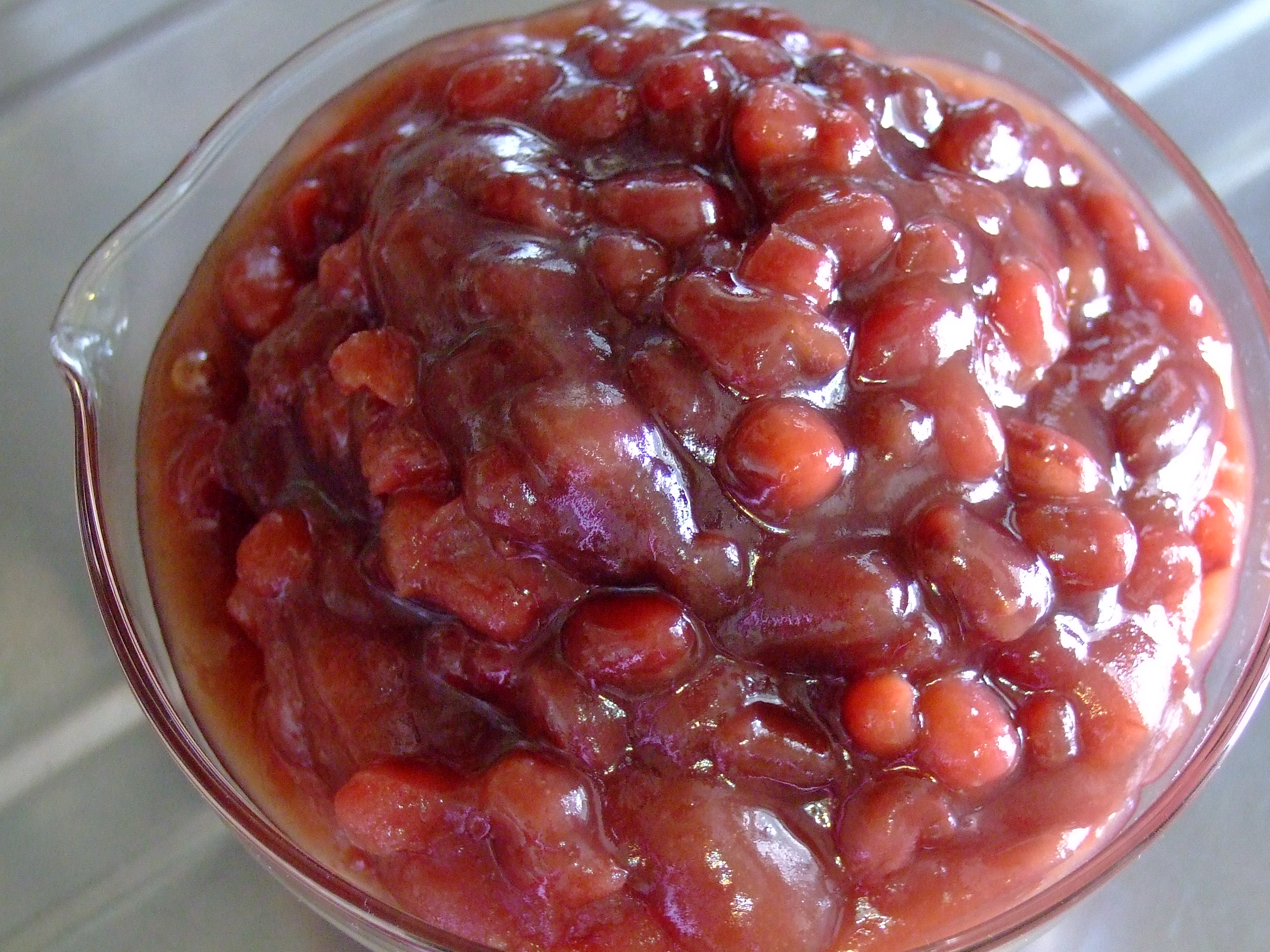
- Alternative names: Red bean jam, adzuki bean paste, anko
- Type: Sweet paste
- Region or state: East Asia
- Main ingredients: Red beans and sugar or honey

Red bean paste (traditional Chinese: 豆沙/紅豆沙; simplified Chinese: 豆沙/红豆沙; Japanese: あんこ or 小豆餡; Korean: 팥소) or red bean jam, also called adzuki bean paste or anko (a Japanese word), is a paste made of red beans (also called "adzuki beans"), used in East Asian cuisine. The paste is prepared by boiling the beans, then mashing or grinding them.

The paste can be sweetened or left as it is. The color is usually dark red, which comes from the husk of the beans. In Korean cuisine, the adzuki beans (often the black variety) can also be husked prior to cooking, resulting in a white paste. It is also possible to remove the husk by sieving after cooking, but before sweetening, resulting in a red paste that is smoother and more homogeneous.

== Etymology ==
Regional names

Chinese name
- Traditional Chinese: 豆沙 / 紅豆沙
- Simplified Chinese: 豆沙 / 红豆沙
- Literal meaning: "Bean paste" / "red bean paste"
Transcriptions
Standard Mandarin
- Hanyu Pinyin: dòushā / hóngdòushā
- Wade–Giles: tou4sha1 / hung2tou4sha1
Yue: Cantonese
- Yale Romanization: huhng dauh sā
- Jyutping: hung4 dau6 saa1

Korean name
- Hangul: 팥소
- Literal meaning: "Red bean filling"
Transcriptions
- Revised Romanization: patso
- McCune–Reischauer: p'atso

Japanese name
- Kanji: 餡 / 小豆餡
- Kana: あん / あずきあん
Transcriptions
- Revised Hepburn: an / azukian

In Japanese, a number of names are used to refer to red bean paste; these include an (餡), anko (餡子) and ogura (小倉). Strictly speaking, the term an can refer to almost any sweet, edible, mashed paste, although without qualifiers red beans are assumed, while azukian (小豆餡) refers specifically to the paste made with red beans. Other common forms of an include shiroan (白餡; "white bean paste"), made from navy or other white beans, green beans and kurian (栗餡), made from chestnuts.

Similarly, the Chinese term dòushā (豆沙; 'bean paste'), applies to red bean paste when used without qualifiers, although hóngdòushā (紅豆沙) explicitly means "red bean paste."

In Korean, pat (팥, Vigna angularis) contrasts with kong (콩, "bean"), rather than being considered a type of it. Kong ("beans") without qualifiers usually means soybeans. As so (소) means "filling", the word patso (팥소) means "pat filling", with unsweetened dark-red paste as its prototype. Dan (단, "sweet") attached to patso makes danpat-so (단팥소), the sweetened red bean paste, which is often called danpat (단팥; "sweet pat"). Geopi (거피, "hulled, skinned, peeled, shelled, etc.") attached to pat makes geopipat (거피팥), the dehulled red beans and the white paste made of geopipat is called geopipat-so (거피팥소).

== Types ==
Red bean paste is graded according to its consistency, sweetness, and color.

Mashed: Adzuki beans are boiled with sugar and mashed. The paste is smooth with bits of broken beans and bean husk. Depending on the intended texture, the beans can be vigorously or lightly mashed. Some unmashed beans can also be added back into the bean paste for additional texture. This is the most common and popular type of red bean paste eaten in Chinese confections. It can also be eaten on its own or in sweet soups.

Smooth
Adzuki beans are boiled without sugar, mashed, and diluted into a slurry. The slurry is then strained through a sieve to remove the husk, filtered, and squeezed dry using cheesecloth. Although the dry paste can be directly sweetened and used, oil, either vegetable oil or lard, is usually used to cook the dry paste and improve its texture and mouth feel. Smooth bean paste is mainly used as a filling for Chinese pastries.

=== Japanese ===
In Japanese cuisine and confectionery, the most common types are:

- Tsubuan (粒餡): Whole red beans are boiled with sugar but otherwise untreated.
- Tsubushian (潰し餡): The beans are mashed after boiling.
- Koshian (漉し餡): The beans are passed through a sieve to remove bean skins. This is the most common type.
- Sarashian (晒し餡): The beans are dried and reconstituted with water.
- Ogura-an (小倉餡): Named after Mt Ogura in western Kyoto, this is a mix of koshian and tsubuan.

=== Korean ===
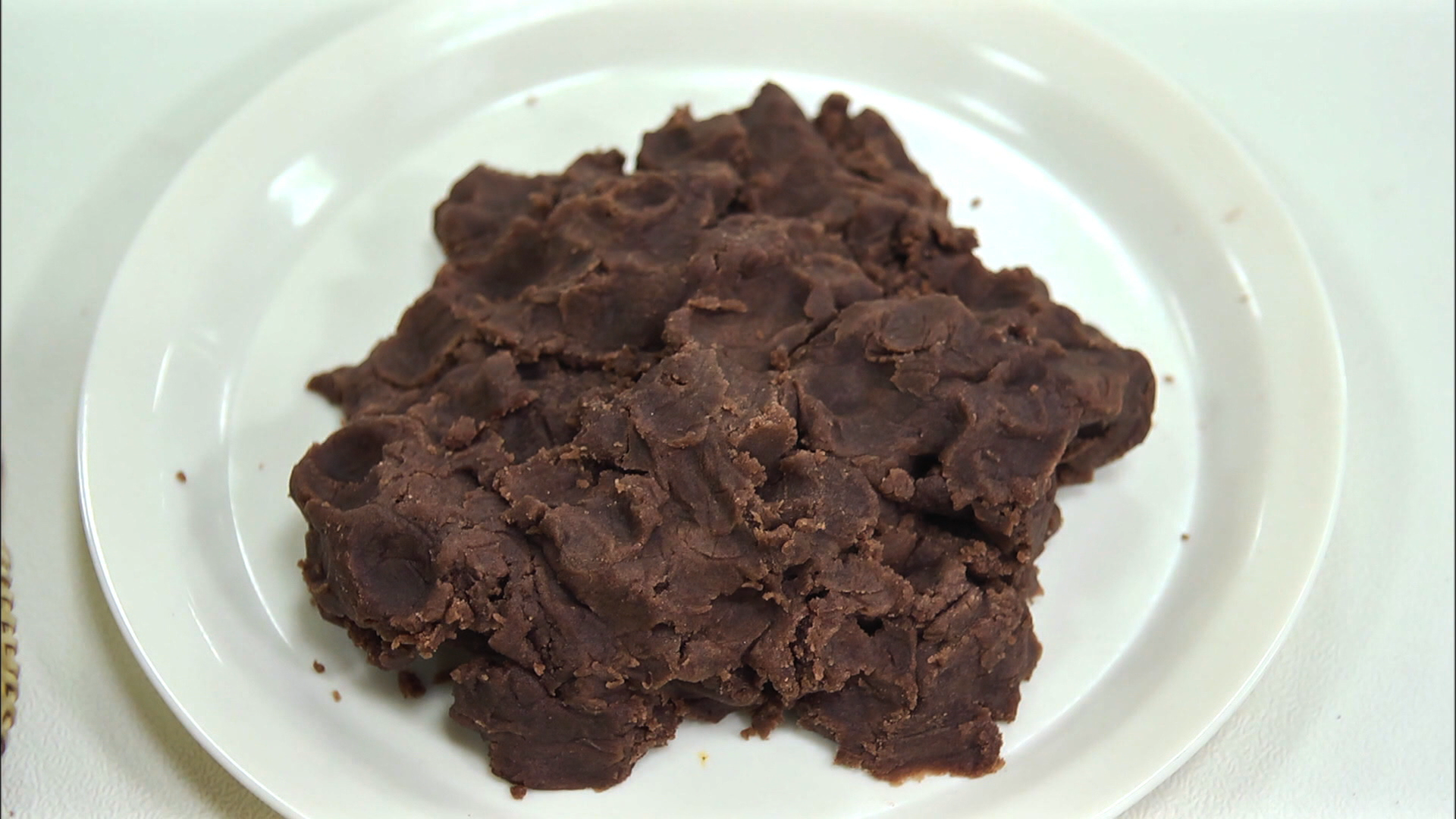
Patso (red bean paste)

In Korean cuisine and confectionery, the most common types are:

- Patso (팥소), dark-red paste made by boiling and then mashing or grinding red beans. The bean skins may or may not be removed by sifting the paste through a sieve to make the paste smoother.
- Danpat (단팥) or danpat-so (단팥소), sweetened red bean paste, made by adding honey or sugar when making patso. The bean skins are often removed to make the paste smoother.
- Geopipat-so (거피팥소), white paste made by boiling dehulled red beans, and then mashing or grinding them.
- Tongpat (통팥), whole beans as filling, not mashed.

== Uses ==
=== Chinese ===
Red bean paste is used in many Chinese dishes, such as:

- Red bean soup (Chinese: 紅豆湯/紅豆沙; pinyin: hóng dòu tāng / hóng dòu shā): In some recipes, red bean paste with more water added to form a tong sui, or thick, sweet soup. It is often cooked and eaten with tangyuan and lotus seeds. This is almost always a dessert.
- Tangyuan (湯圓; tāng yúan): Glutinous rice balls filled with sweet fillings such as red bean paste and boiled in plain or sweetened water.
- Sweet zongzi (粽子; zòng zi): Glutinous rice and red bean paste wrapped with bamboo leaves and steamed or boiled. The glutinous rice used to make zongzi is usually specially prepared and appears yellow.
- Mooncakes (月餅; yuè bǐng): A baked pastry consisting of thin dough surrounding a filling. The filling is traditionally made from various ingredients, including mashed lotus seeds, red bean paste, or other fillings. The texture of this filling is quite similar to straight red bean paste. It is most commonly eaten during the Mid-Autumn Festival.
- Bāozi (豆沙包; dòu shā bāo): Steamed leavened bread filled with a variety of savoury or sweet fillings.
- Jiān dui (煎堆): Fried pastry made from glutinous rice flour, sometimes filled with red bean paste.
- Red bean cake (红豆糕; hóng dòu gāo): It is a type of Asian cake with a sweet red bean paste filling. It is made primarily with adzuki beans.
- Red bean pancake
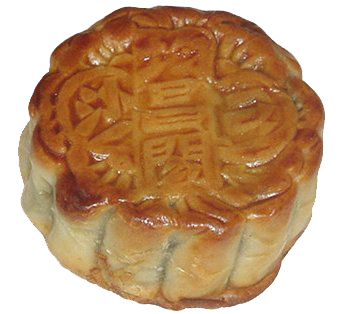
Chinese mooncake

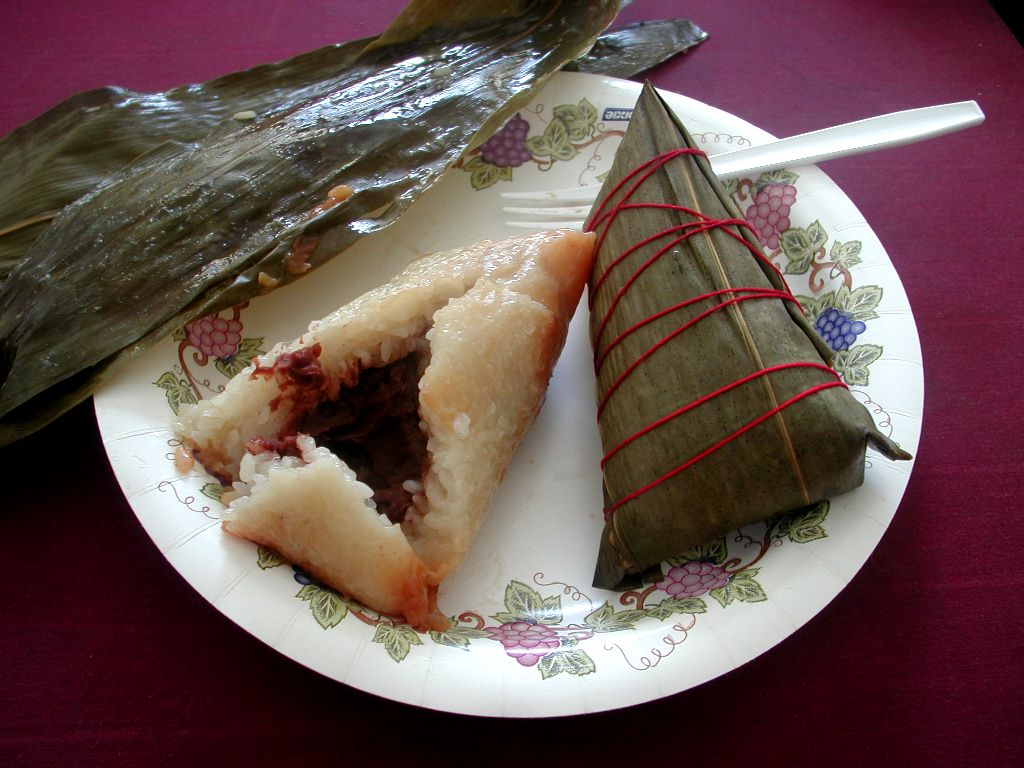
Zongzi

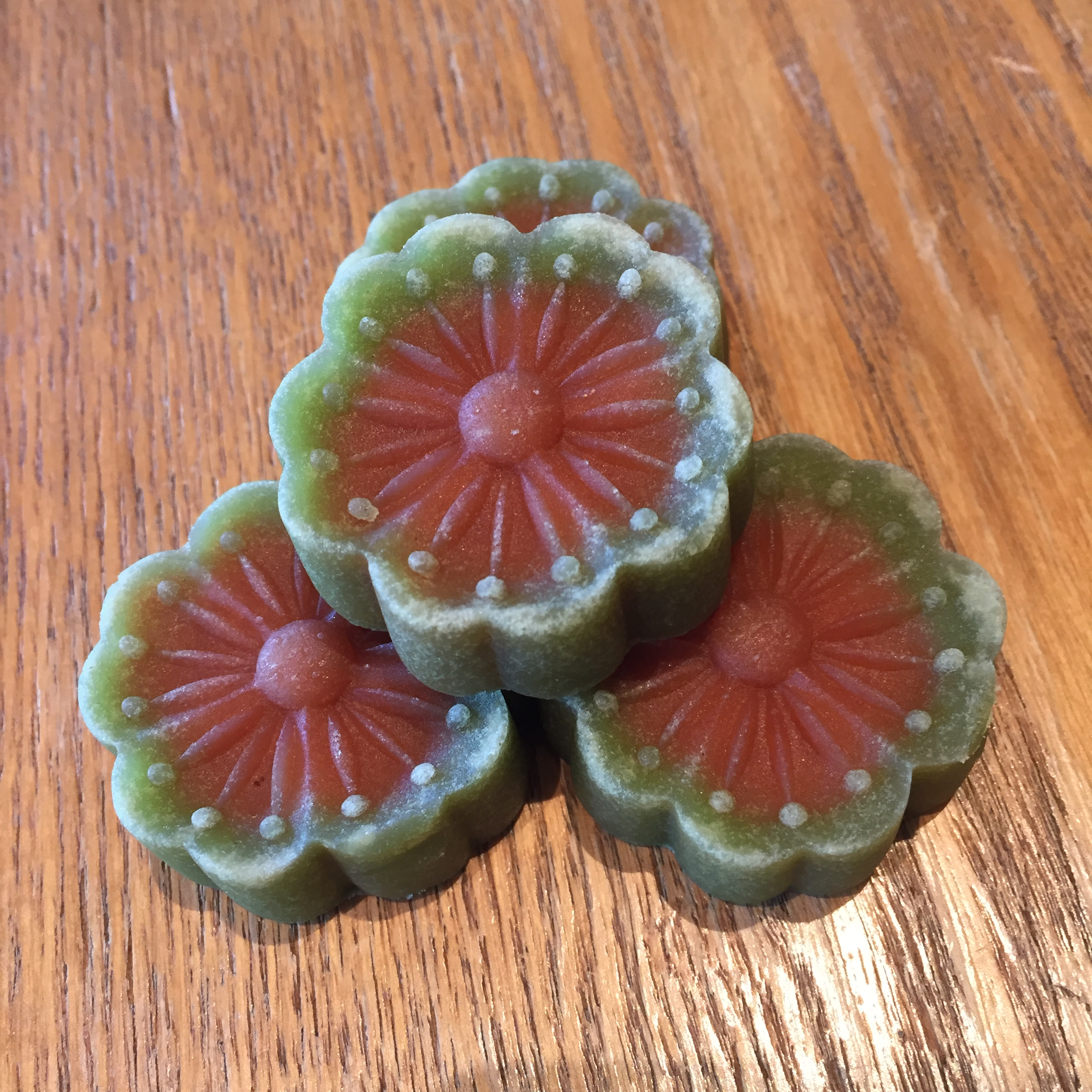
Dougao (bean cake)

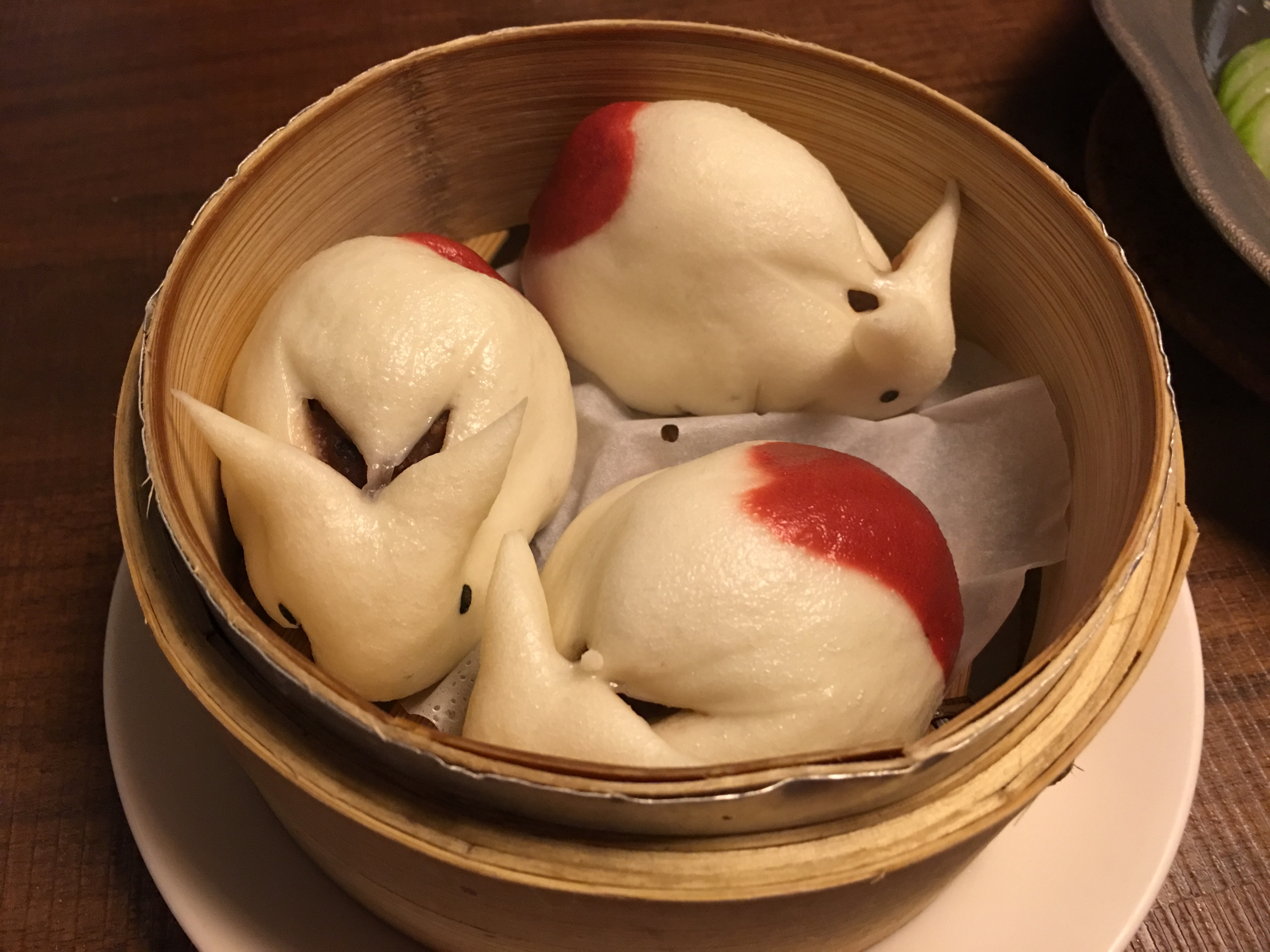
Doushabao

=== Japanese ===
Red bean paste is used in many Japanese sweets.

- Anmitsu, a dessert consisting of red bean paste, small cubes of agar jelly, and pieces of fruit served with syrup.
- Anpan, a sweet bun filled with red bean paste.
- An-doughnut, a variety of doughnut that uses red bean paste as its filling.
- Daifuku, a confection consisting of a small round rice cake stuffed with red bean paste.
- Anko dango, a dumpling made from rice flour that is sometimes topped or filled with red bean paste.
- Dorayaki, a confection consisting of two small pancake-like patties made from castella wrapped around a filling of red bean paste.
- Imagawayaki, a dessert filled with the paste. Also known as Ōban-yaki.
- Manjū, a steamed cake filled with red bean paste.
- Oshiruko or Zenzai, adzuki bean soup, commonly served with rice cake.
- Sakuramochi, a Japanese sweet consisting of sweet pink-colored rice cake (mochi) with a red bean paste (anko) center, and wrapped in a pickled cherry blossom (sakura) leaf.
- Taiyaki, a fish-shaped cake stuffed with red bean paste.
- Yōkan, a thick jellied dessert made of red bean paste, agar, and sugar.
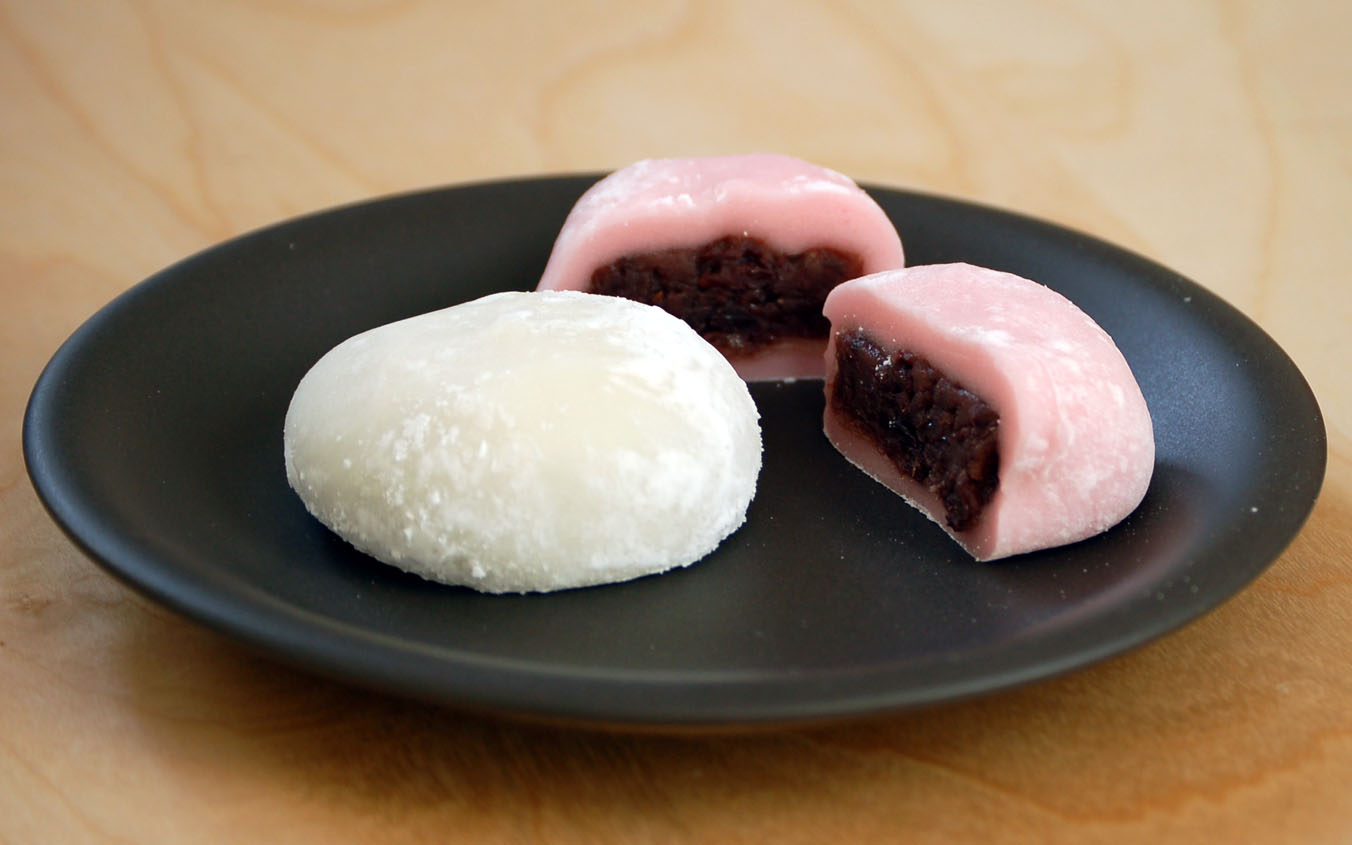
Daifuku filled with red bean paste

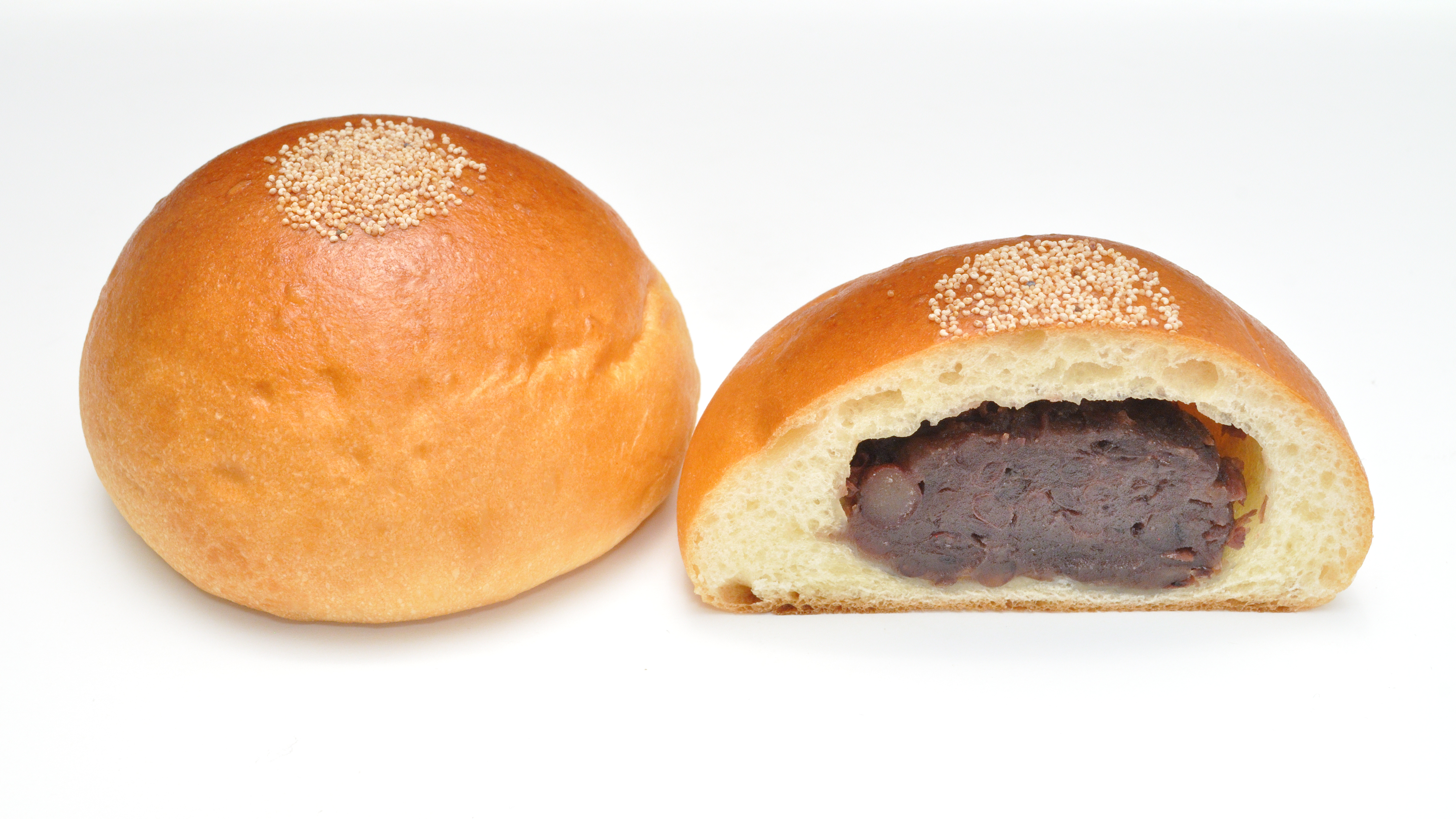
Japanese Anpan

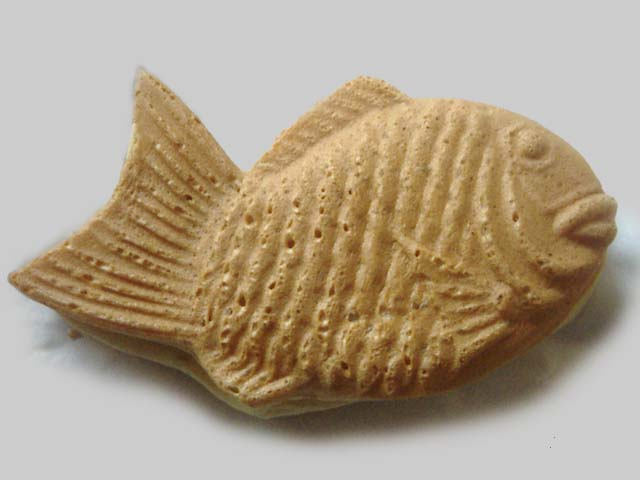
Japanese Taiyaki

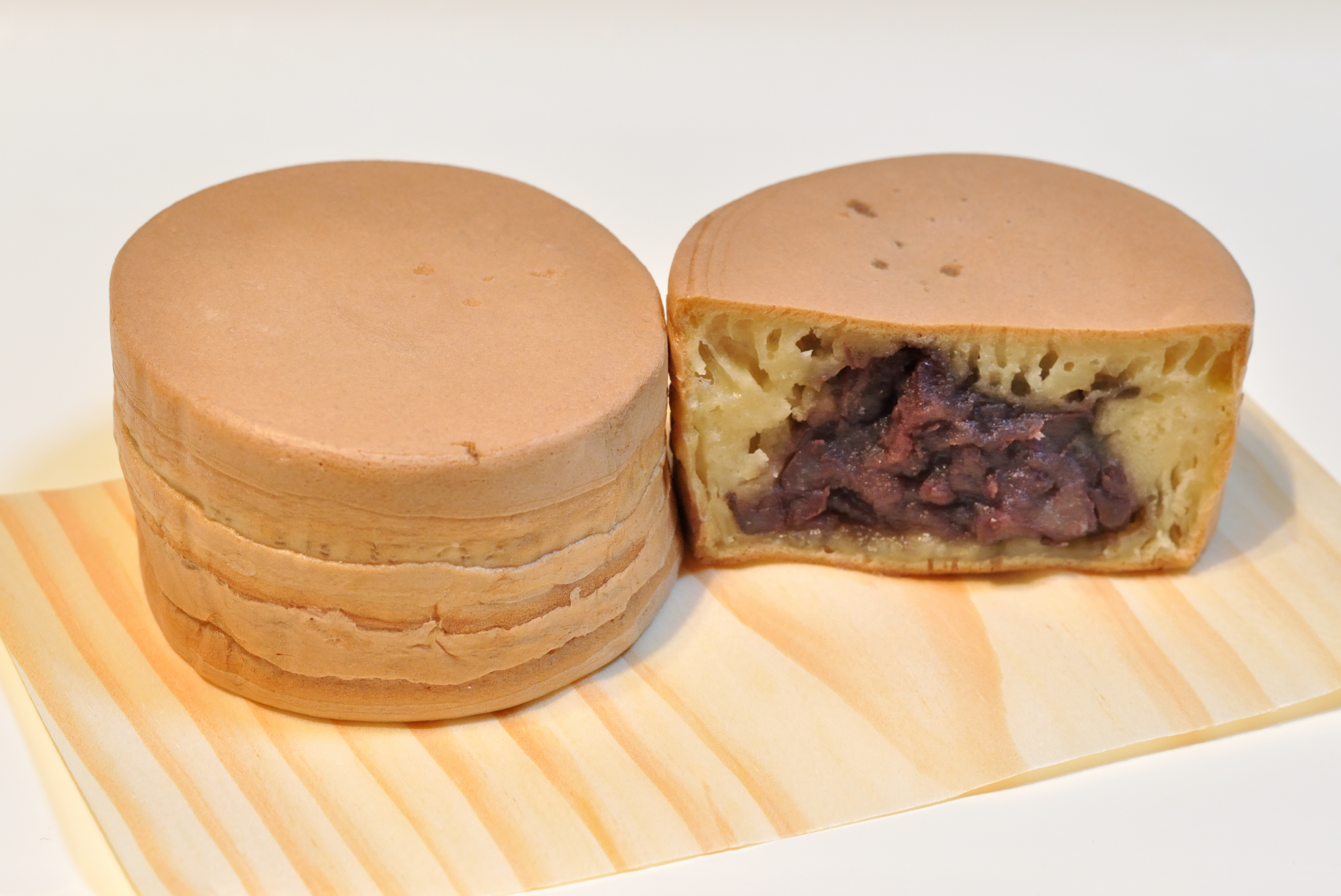
Imagawayaki

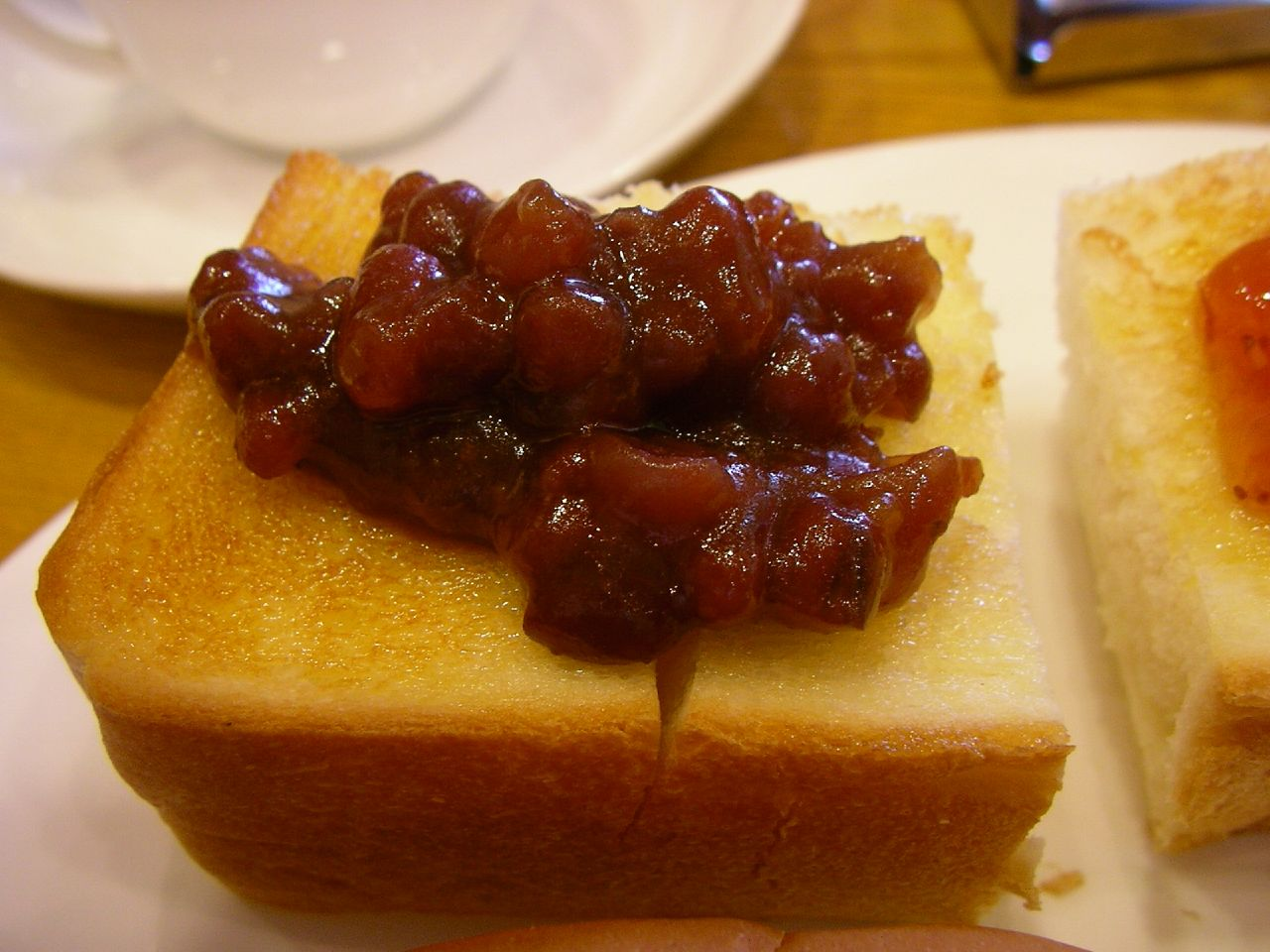
Ogura toast

=== Korean ===
Red bean paste is used in various Korean snack foods and desserts, including:

- Baram-tteok, a type of tteok filled with white geopipat-so.
- Bungeo-ppang, a fish-shaped pastry filled with sweet danpat-so.
- Chalbori-ppang, two small and sweet pancakes wrapping around sweet danpat-so.
- Chapssal doughnut, a glutinous rice doughnut filled with sweet danpat-so.
- Gyeongdan, a rice ball cake filled with sweet danpat-so.
- Hodu-gwaja, a walnut-shaped cookie filled with sweet danpat-so.
- Hoppang, a warm fluffy pastry filled with sweet danpat-so or sweet nokdu-so (mung bean paste).
- Hwangnam-ppang, a pastry with a chrysanthemum imprinted on the top, filled with sweet danpat-so.
- Jjinppang, a warm fluffy pastry filled with unsweetened patso, usually with the skins of the red beans.
- Kkulppang, a sweet pastry covered with sweet danpat-so and covered with corn syrup.
- Patbingsu, a type of shaved ice.
- Songpyeon, a type of tteok filled with various fillings including unsweetened patso, sweetened (danpat-so), or white (geopipat-so).
- Ttongppang, a poo-shaped pastry filled with sweet danpat-so.
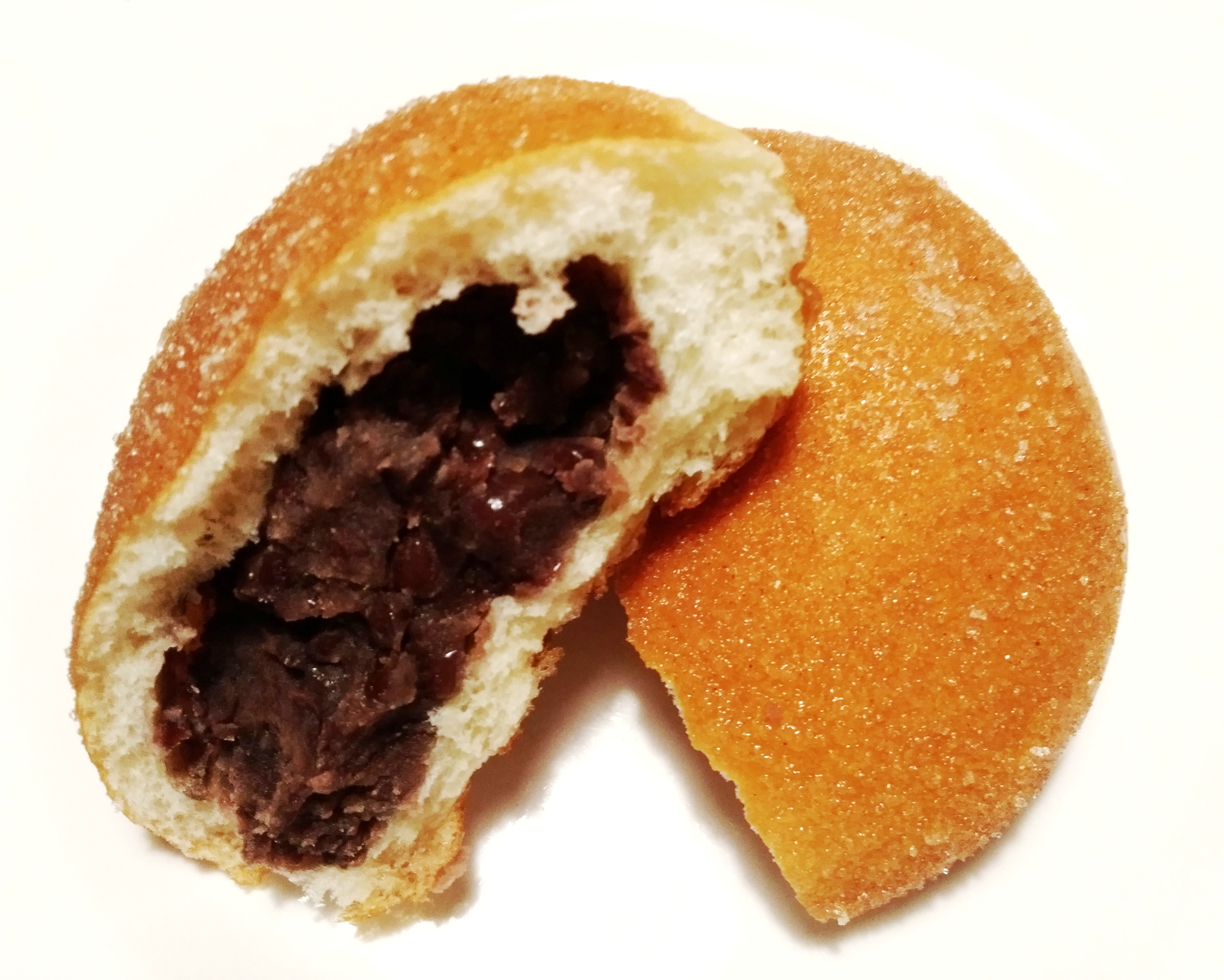
Danpat-doneot filled with danpat-so

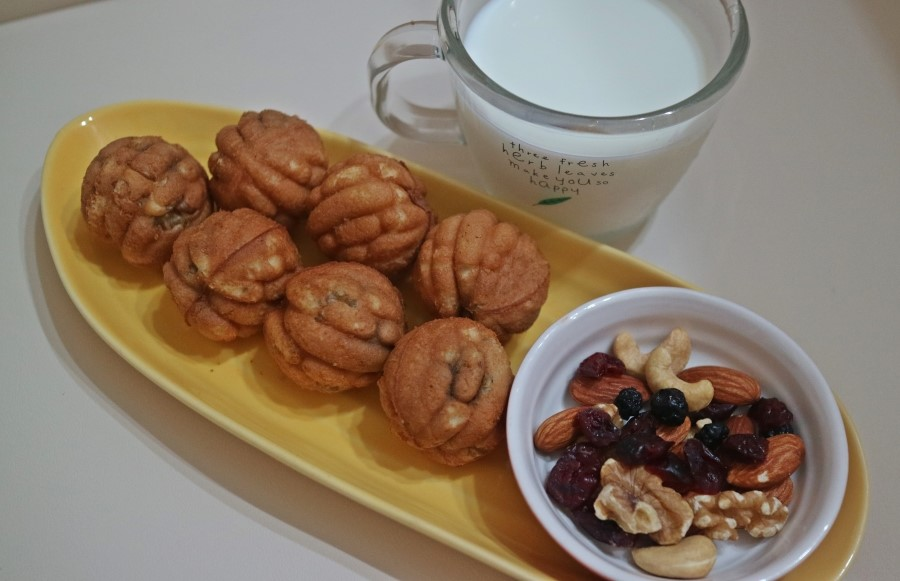
Hodu-gwaja filled with danpat-so

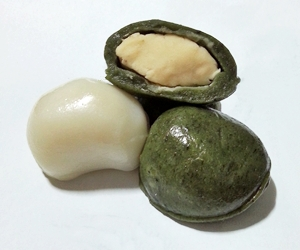
Baram-tteok filled with geopipat-so

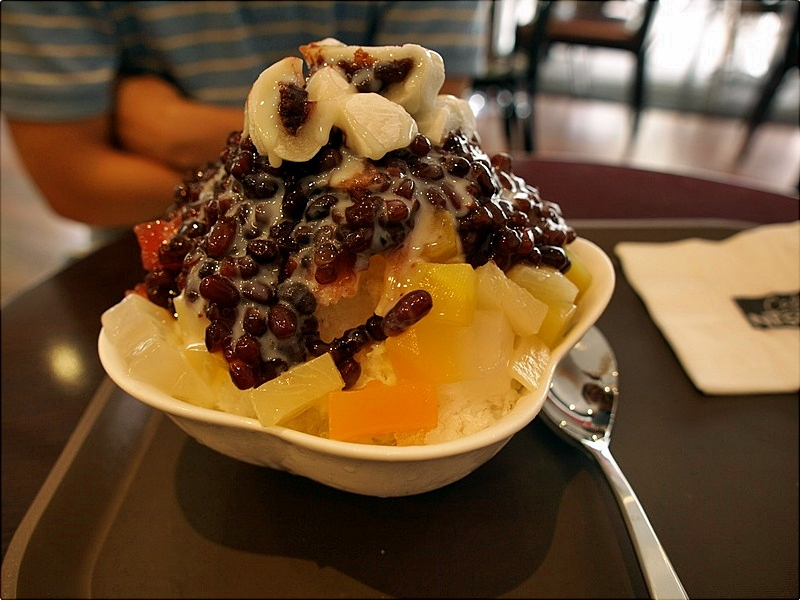
Patbingsu

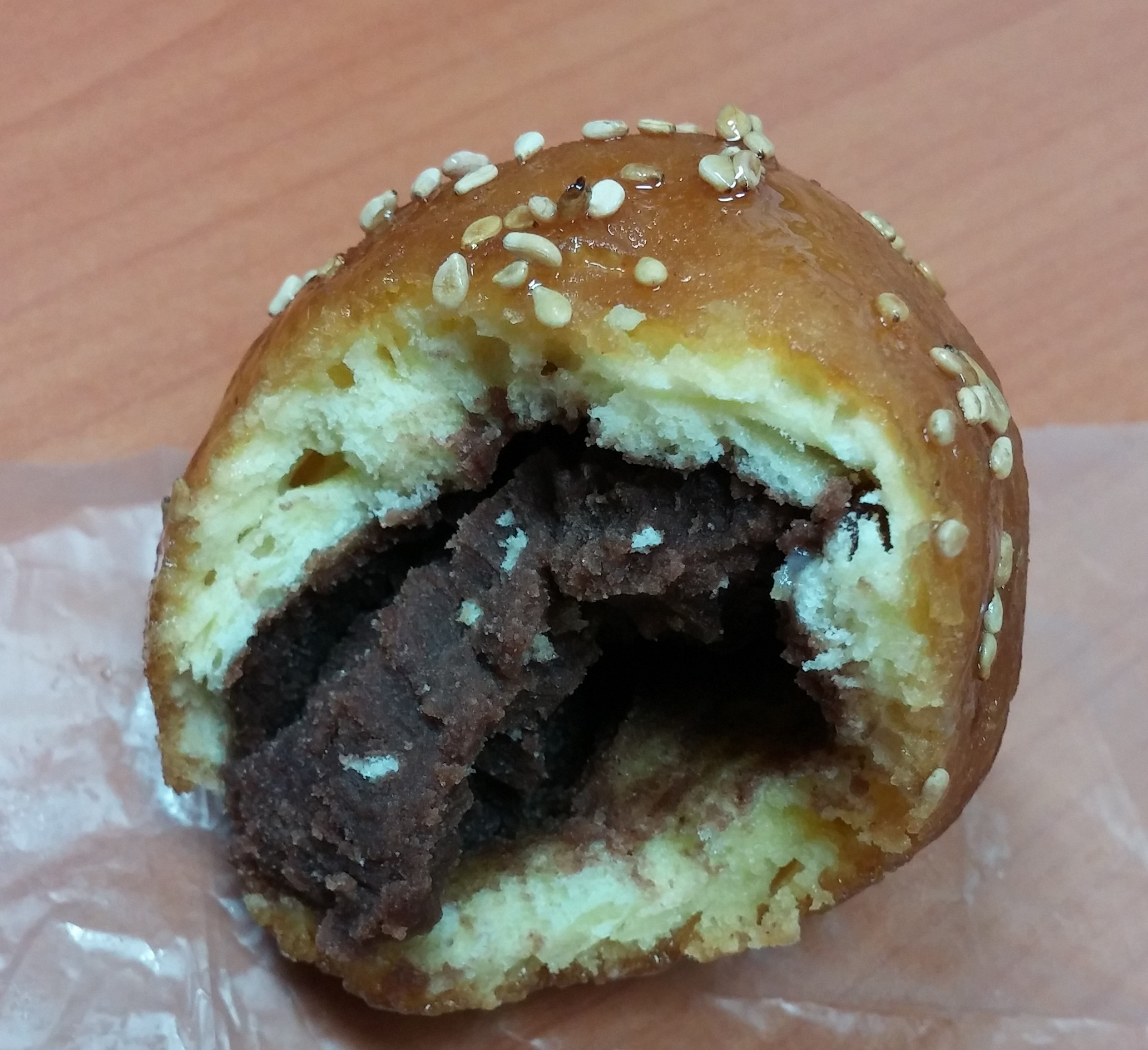
Kkulppang

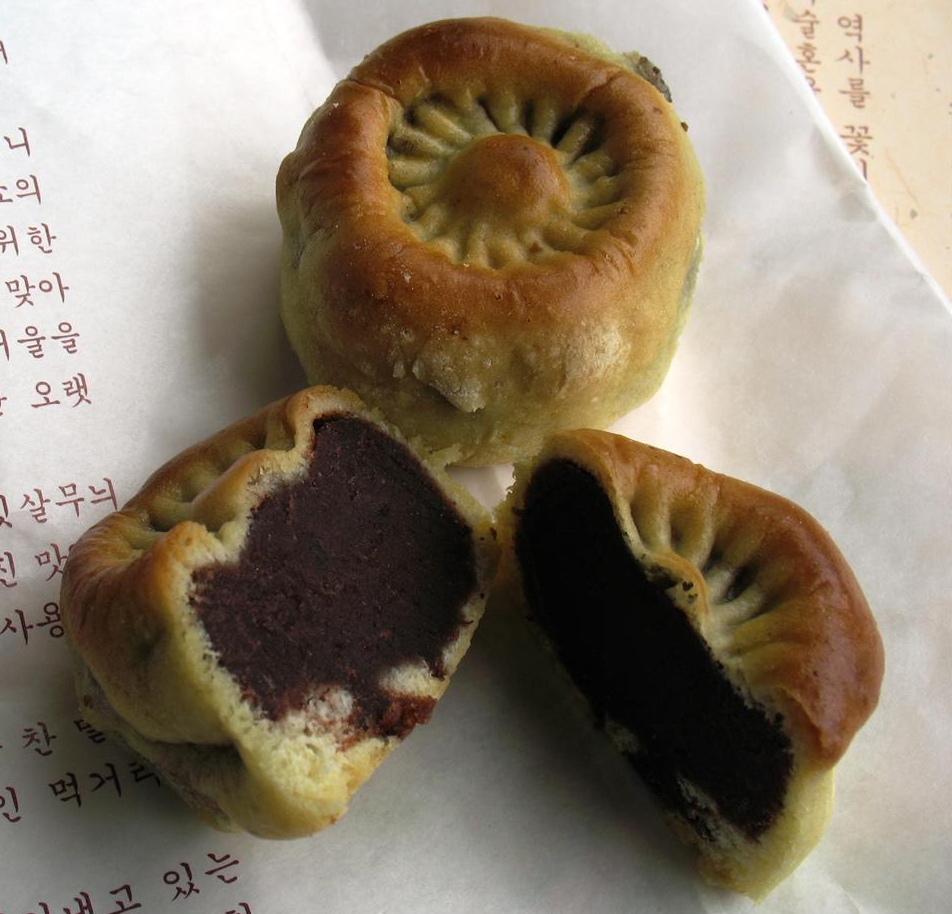
Hwangnam-ppang

== See also ==
- Adzuki bean
- Black bean paste
- List of legume dishes
- Sweet bean paste
- Fermented bean paste
