= Sweet bean paste =

Bean paste used in Asian cuisines

- Chinese: 豆沙
- Hanyu Pinyin: dòu shā
- Jyutping: dau6 saa1
- Literal meaning: bean sand
Transcriptions
Standard Mandarin
- Hanyu Pinyin: dòu shā
Yue: Cantonese
- Jyutping: dau6 saa1

Sweet bean paste is a food ingredient used throughout East Asian cuisine, primarily as a filling for sweet desserts and pastries.

== Production ==
The beans are usually boiled without sugar, mashed, and diluted into a slurry. The slurry is then strained through a sieve to remove the husks. The resulting liquid is then filtered and squeezed dry using cheesecloth, and then finally sweetened. Oil in the form of either vegetable oil or lard is usually added to the relatively dry paste to improve its texture and mouthfeel.

Oiled sweet bean paste is mainly found as fillings for Chinese pastries, while un-oiled sweet bean pastes can be used to make tong sui. Japanese pastries use primarily un-oiled sweet bean pastes.

== Types ==
There are several types of sweet bean paste:

- Oil bean paste (油豆沙) – made from adzuki beans; dark brown or black in colour from the addition of sugar and animal fat or vegetable oil, and further cooking; sometimes also includes sweet osmanthus flavor
- Mung bean paste (綠豆沙) – made from mung beans and dull reddish purple in colour
- Red bean paste (紅豆沙) – made from adzuki beans and dark red in colour
- White bean paste (白豆沙) – made from navy beans and greyish off-white in colour^{photo}
- Black bean potato paste (黑豆沙) – made from black soybean powder (黑豆面) and potatoes; used in Beijing cuisine and other cuisines of northern China^{photo}

== Others ==
There are a number of other pastes used in Chinese cuisine, primarily as fillings for dessert items. Although not made from beans, they share similar usage and are equally popular. They are very similar in flavor and texture to sweet bean paste. These include:

- Lotus seed paste
- Black sesame paste

== Gallery ==
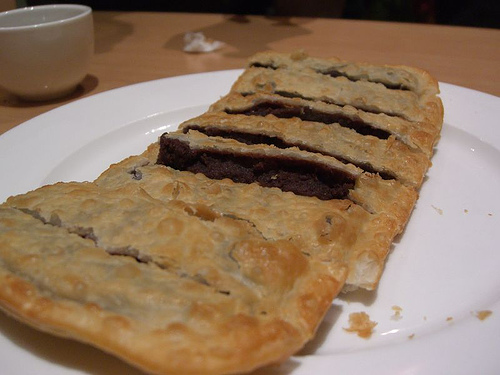
Chinese pancake using sweet bean paste as an ingredient

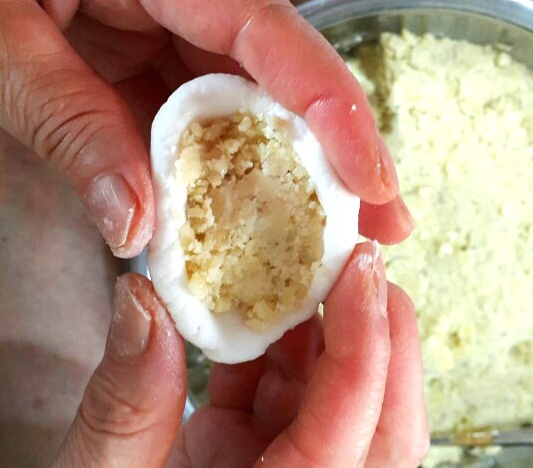
Filling songpyeon with mung bean paste

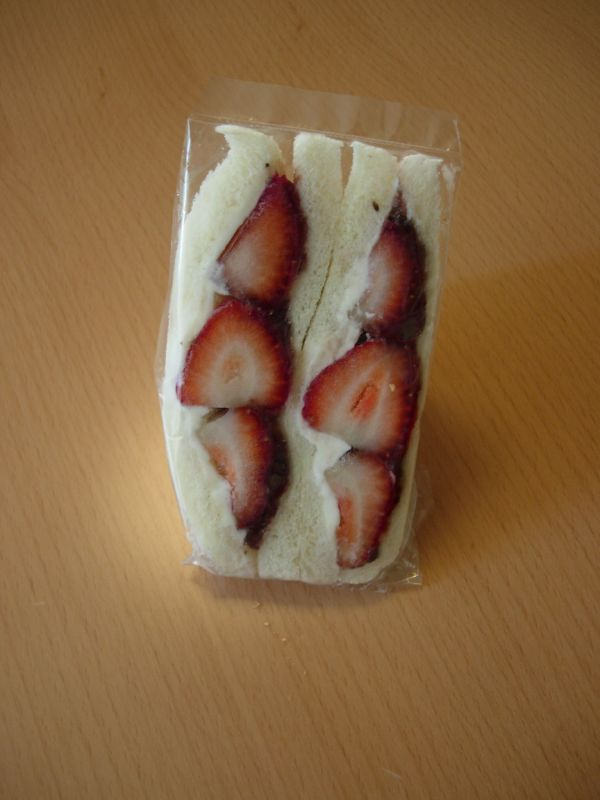
Sandwich in Nagoya

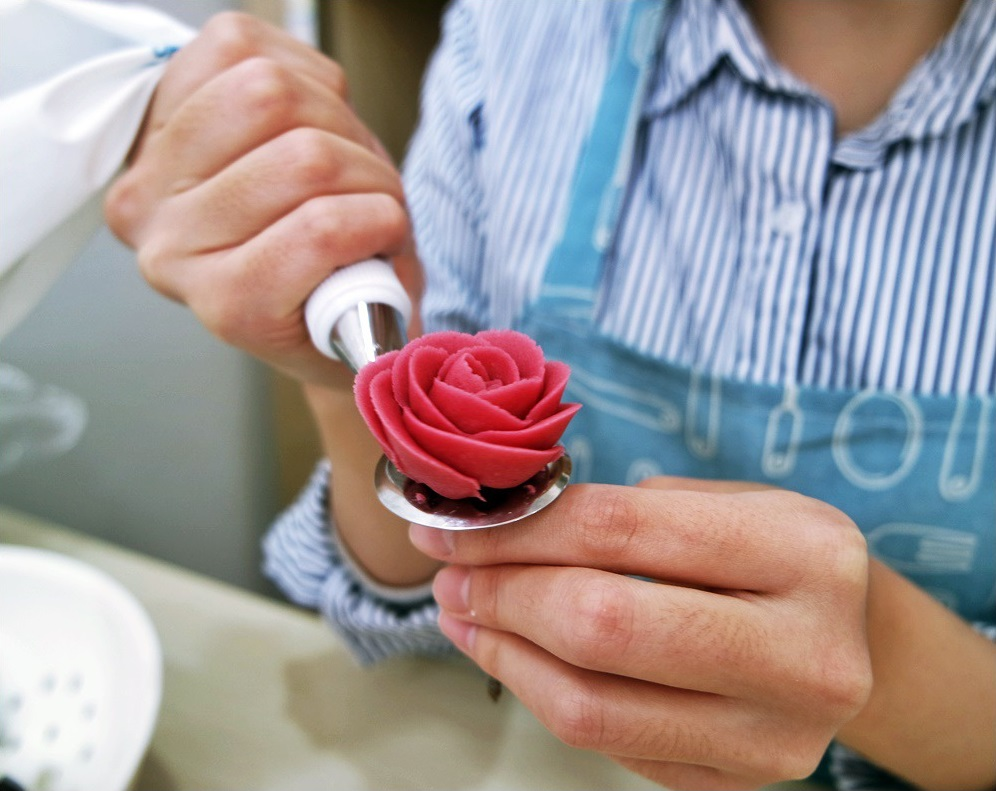
Making bean paste flower

== See also ==
- Bean dip
- Fermented bean paste
