= Cha siu bao =

Cantonese barbecue-pork-filled bun

Char siu bao
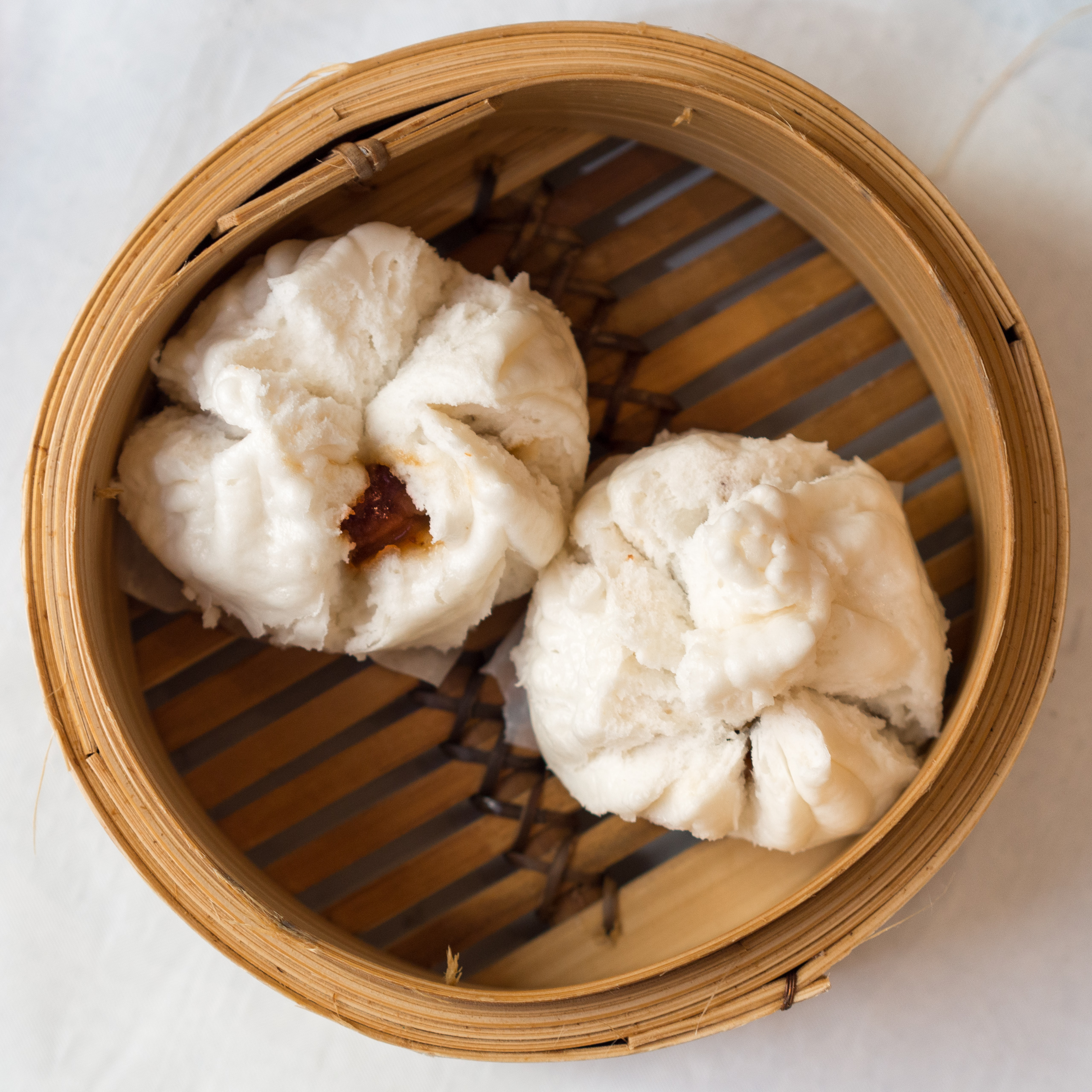
- Alternative names: Chashaobao, manapua, keke pua'a, chao pao
- Type: Dim sum
- Place of origin: Southern China
- Serving temperature: Hot
- Main ingredients: Pork
- Variations: Baked or steamed

Cha siu bao
- Simplified Chinese: 叉烧包
- Traditional Chinese: 叉燒包
- Jyutping: caa1 siu1 baau1
- Cantonese Yale: chāsīu bāau
- Hanyu Pinyin: chāshāo bāo
- Literal meaning: barbecued pork bun
Transcriptions
Standard Mandarin
- Hanyu Pinyin: chāshāo bāo
- Bopomofo: ㄔㄚ ㄕㄠ ㄅㄠ
- Wade–Giles: Ch'a^{1}-shao^{1} pao^{1}
- IPA: [ʈʂʰá.ʂáʊ páʊ]
Hakka
- Romanization: chaseu bao
Yue: Cantonese
- Yale Romanization: chāsīu bāau
- Jyutping: caa1 siu1 baau1
- IPA: [tsʰa˥.siw˥ paw˥]
Southern Min
- Hokkien POJ: chhe-sio-pau

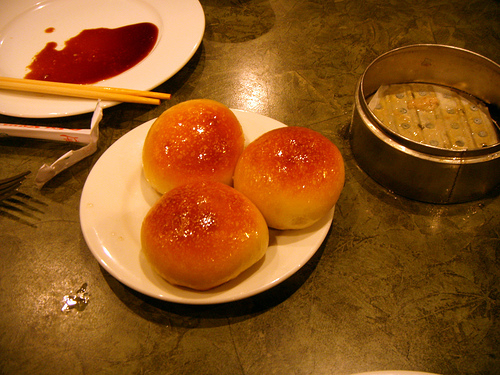
Baked cha siu bao dough for this type is different from the steamed version

Cha siu bao (simplified Chinese: 叉烧包; traditional Chinese: 叉燒包; pinyin: chāshāo bāo; Jyutping: caa1 siu1 baau1; Cantonese Yale: chā sīu bāau; lit. 'barbecued pork bun') is a Cantonese baozi (bun) filled with barbecue-flavored cha siu pork. They are served as a type of dim sum during yum cha and are sometimes sold in Chinese bakeries.

== Varieties ==
There are two major kinds of cha siu bao: the traditional steamed version is called 蒸叉燒包 (pinyin: zhēng chāshāo bāo; Jyutping: zing1 caa1 siu1 baau1; Cantonese Yale: jīng chāsīu bāau) or simply 叉燒包 (chāshāo bāo; caa1 siu1 baau1; chāsīu bāau), while the baked variety is usually called 叉燒餐包 (chāshāo cān bāo; caa1 siu1 caan1 baau1; chāsīu chāan bāau). Steamed cha siu bao has a white exterior, while the baked variety is browned glazed.

== Cantonese cuisine ==
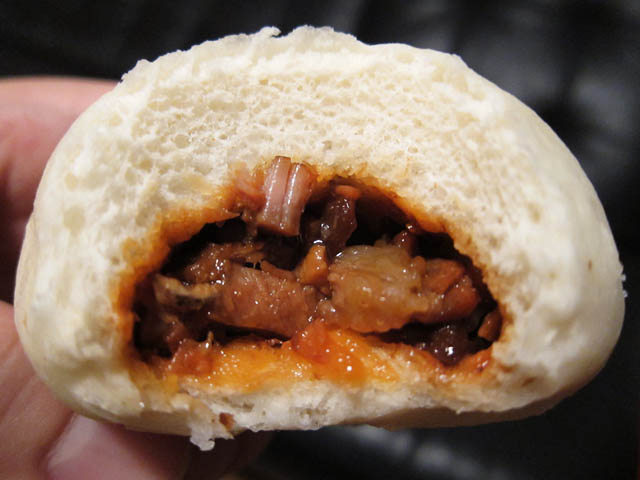
Filling

Although visually similar to other types of steamed baozi, the dough of steamed cha siu bao is unique since it makes use of both yeast and baking powder as leavening. This unique mix of leavening gives the dough of cha siu bao the texture of a slightly dense, but fine soft bread. Tangzhong, a water roux, is sometimes used to keep the bread soft over long periods of time and aids in improving the texture of the bao.

An alternative version of the steamed char siu bao is a baked version. While the dough is very similar, the baked char siu bao is more similar to a baked bun with the same char siu filling. It is often coated with an egg and sugar wash before baking, resulting in a slightly sweeter, more bready char siu bao.

Encased in the center of the bun is tender, sweet, slow-roasted pork tenderloin. This cha siu is diced, and then mixed into a syrupy mixture of oyster sauce, hoisin sauce, roasted sesame seed oil, rice vinegar, shaoxing wine or dry sherry, soy sauce, sugar, and cornstarch.

== Philippine cuisine ==
Siopao (simplified Chinese: 烧包; traditional Chinese: 燒包; Pe̍h-ōe-jī: sio-pau; Tagalog pronunciation: [ˈʃoː.paʊ̯]), literally meaning "hot bun", is the Philippine indigenized version of baozi. A common variant of the siopao, the siopao asado, is derived from the char siu bao and has a filling (asado) which uses similar ingredients to char siu. It differs in that the Filipino asado is a braised dish, not grilled, and is more similar in cooking style to the Hokkien tau yu bak (Chinese: 豆油肉; Pe̍h-ōe-jī: tāu-iû bah). It is slightly sweeter than char siu and can also be cooked with chicken. Siopao is also typically much larger than the char siu bao or the baozi.

== Polynesian cuisine ==
At the invitation of the European powers, the Chinese were recruited as indentured laborers throughout in the Pacific to work on sugar plantations starting in the mid-1800s. Chinese immigrants brought with them foods such as char siu bao which they adapted to their new location.

In Hawaiian cuisine, it is called manapua. Hawaiian pidgin for "delicious pork thing". In Samoa, the item is referred to as keke pua'a, literally meaning "pig cake". In Tahiti, French Polynesia, they are called chao pao.

== See also ==
- Bánh bao (Vietnam)
- Dim sum
- Goubuli
- Jjinppang/Hoppang (South Korea)
- List of buns
- List of pork dishes
- List of snack foods
- List of steamed foods
- List of stuffed dishes
- Nikuman (Japan)
- Siopao (Philippines)
