= Manapua =

Hawaiian adaptation of Chinese baozi

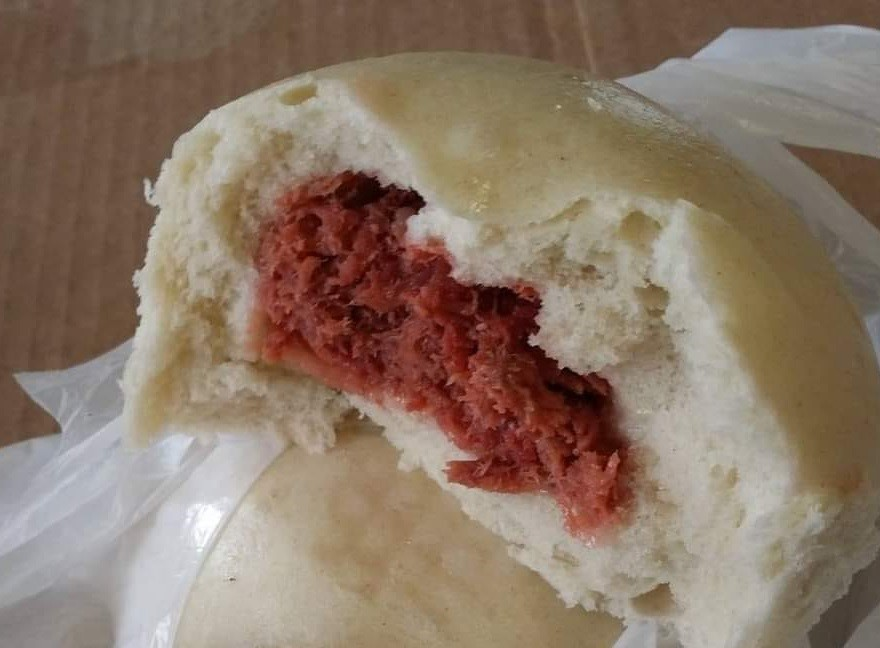
- Manapua with shredded char siu filling
- Type: Dim sum
- Region or state: Hawaii
- Serving temperature: Hot, room temperature
- Main ingredients: Pork
- Variations: Steamed or baked; lap cheong, curry chicken, sweetened red or black bean paste, kalua pig, sweet potato/ube, hot dog,

Manapua is the Hawaiian adaptation of the Chinese bun, baozi, derived specifically from char siu bao. However, in contemporary times, the term is generally applied to a large char siu bao or other steamed, baked, or fried bao variations of different fillings.

These bao would later be known as manapua, said to be a portmanteau of the Hawaiian phrase mea ʻono puaʻa, roughly translated as "pork cake" – mea ʻono referring to any food item encompassing dessert, cake, pastry, cookie (Note: lit. "delicious thing") and puaʻa meaning "pork" or "pig". (Note: Hawaiian does not differentiate animals in their living and meat forms unlike English influenced by French.)

== Background ==
The prospect of financial reward found in the sugar industry caused much Chinese immigration starting in the mid 1800s. The Chinese would bring along with them their foods including baozi, a carbohydrate rich food essential for sustenance against the intense physical labor demanded in sugar production. Some of these Chinese laborers, who would later be known as a "manapua man", would peddle their char siu bao in the plantation fields and to other plantation camps by foot and later by vehicle for additional income.

These traditional char siu bao would eventually grow in size into the modern manapua known today. Bat Moi Kam Mau is credited with retailing the first large char siu bao in the 1940s at her manapua shop "Char Hung Sut". Honolulu restaurant Royal Kitchen claimed to have been one of the first retailers of baked manapua in 1974.

== Description ==
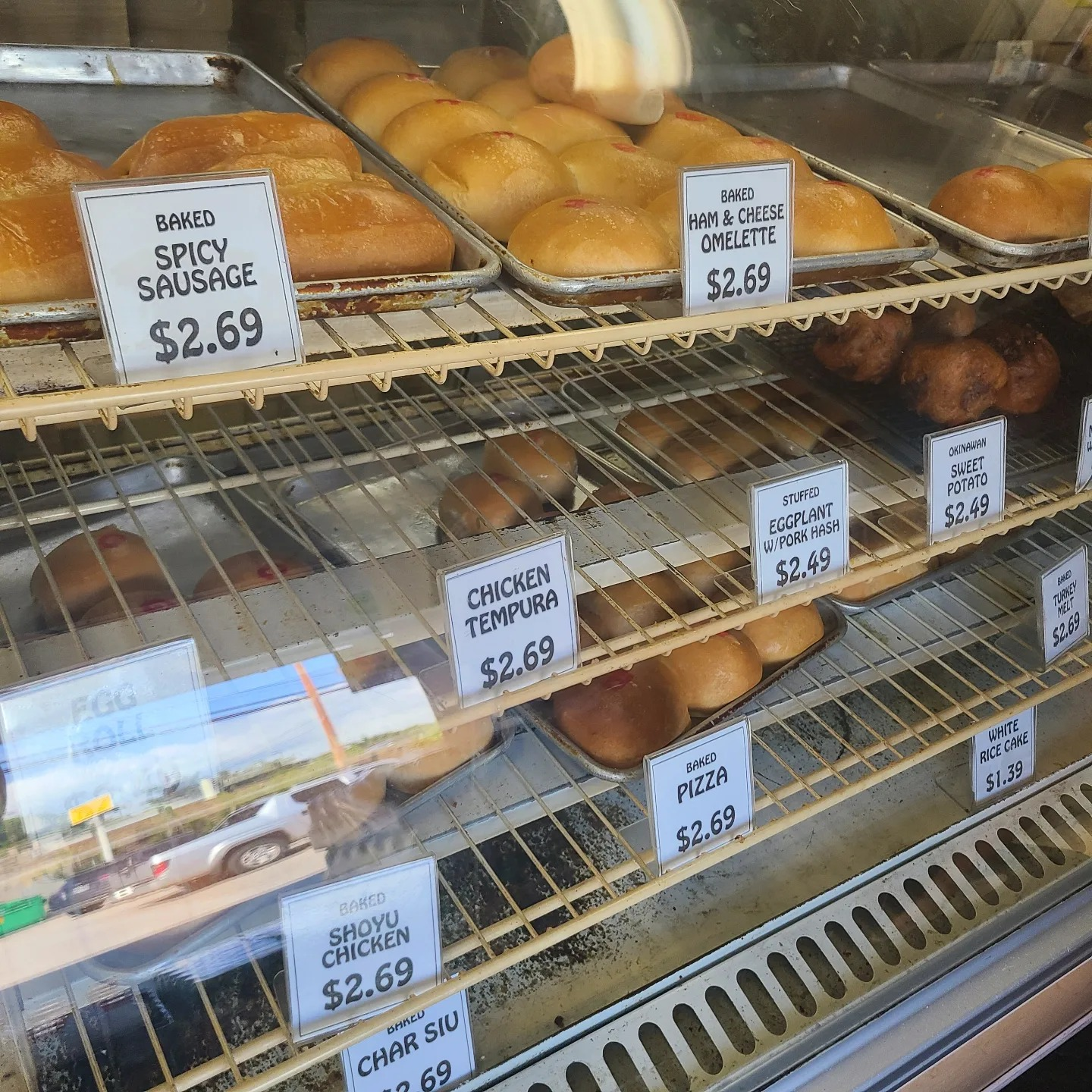
Variety of baked manapuas for sale

While manapua dimensions are not formally regulated, once cooked, many are close to 4-5 inches (~13cm) in diameter and 3-4 inches (~8cm) in height. On the other hand, char siu bao sold in many classic Chinese restaurants still retain their original size and shape and are simply known by its original name rather than manapua.

Char siu remains a staple filling. However, its preparation is sometimes simplified to pork with char siu flavoring rather than being prepared with actual roasted char siu. Other fillings have been introduced, some reflecting the various ethnic groups in Hawaii. Other common meat fillings include: lap cheong and hot dog which uses a full (uncut) sausage, chicken curry, and kalua pork. Vegetarian options include: black bean paste commonly known as "black sugar", azuki similar to anpan, Okinawan purple sweet potato (sometimes mislabeled as ube).

A single bun can be consumed as a "meal in itself" or divided and shared as a snack along with other local style dim sum items. Older standalone manapua shops will also offer a handful of other dim sum items such as fun guo known as "pepeiao", gok jai or "half moon" which are normally steamed, shaomai or "pork hash". Like the manapua, these too, have become twice the size of their original counterparts. Manapua and these other dim sum items are often bought in bulk as omiyage when traveling to the neighbor island or out-of-state, or shared in office meetings or breakrooms akin to donuts.

== In popular culture ==
=== Manapua man ===
In the 1970s, manapua hawkers would trade in their carrying pole for a converted full-size van. These modern hawkers, affectionately known as a manapua man, would drive their manapua van through neighborhoods following strategies akin to ice cream trucks and food trucks such as playing music or being parked at certain locations. Sometimes manapua vans are more akin to a convenience store on wheels, where, in addition to the main merchandise, chow mein, candies, burgers, fountain drinks, or even cigarettes and beers are sold.

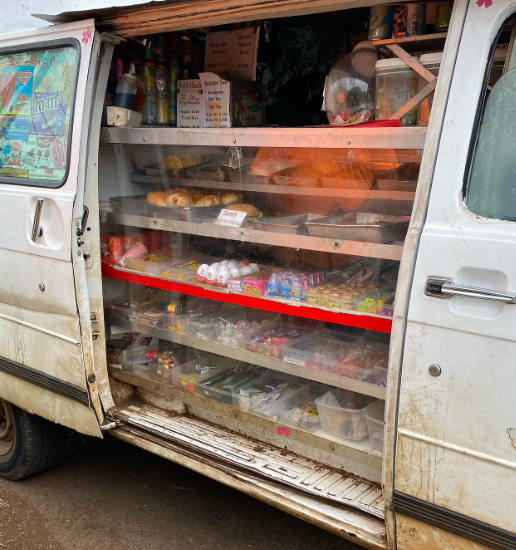
Exterior side view manapua van

== See also ==
- Cuisine of Hawaii
- Baozi
- Dim sum
- Siopao
