= Fried Liver =

In chess, the Fried Liver refers to the Fried Liver Attack, a chess opening.

Fried Liver or fried liver may also refer to:

- Chaogan, a kind of Chinese cuisine.
- Liver (food)
