= Siopao =

Philippine steamed bun

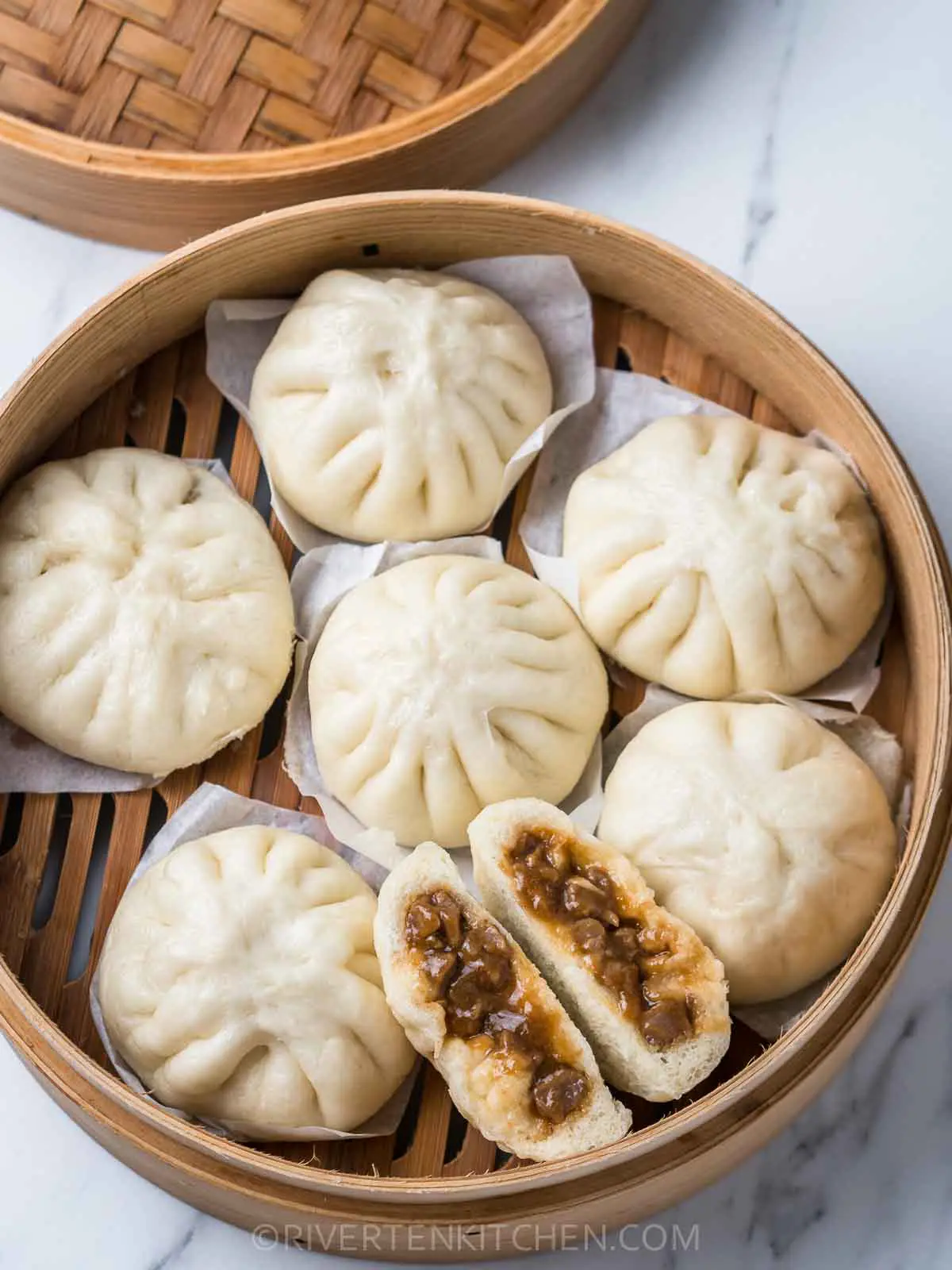
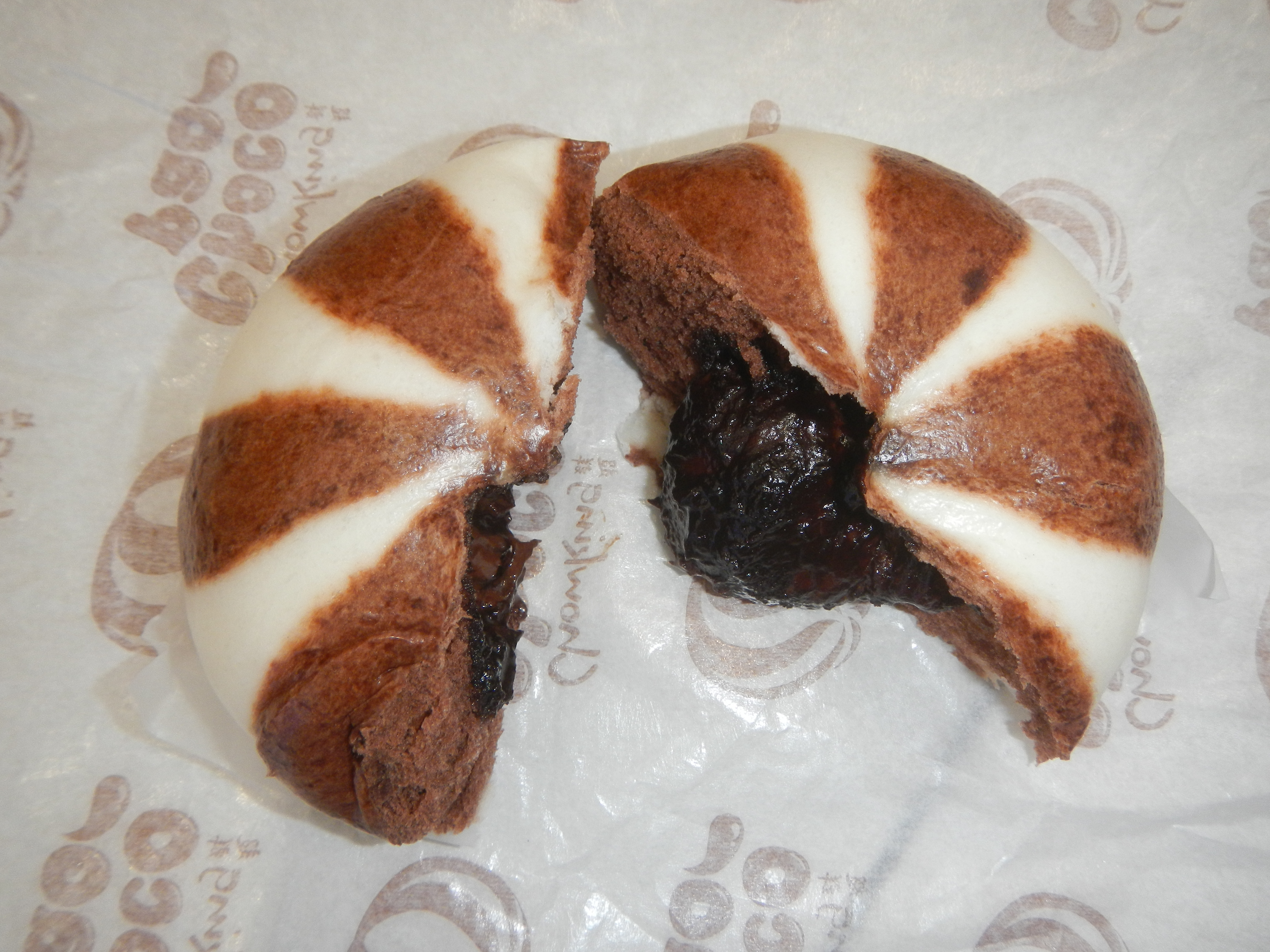
- Top: Asado siopao; Bottom: A dessert siopao with chocolate filling
- Type: Baozi
- Course: Snack
- Place of origin: Philippines
- Main ingredients: Pork, flour, soy sauce, salt
- Variations: Siopao asado, siopao bola bola, toasted siopao, fried siopao, paowaw, other dessert variants
- Food energy (per serving): 330 kcal (1,400 kJ)
- Similar dishes: Baozi (China), char siu bao (China), siu pao (Marshall Islands), salapao (Thailand), manapua (Hawaii), keke pua'a (Samoa & American Samoa)

Siopao (Tagalog pronunciation: [ˈʃopaʊ]) is a Philippine steamed bun with various fillings. It is the indigenized version of the Fujianese baozi, introduced to the Philippines by Hokkien immigrants during the Spanish colonial period. It is a popular snack in the Philippines and is commonly sold by bakeries and restaurants.

== Description ==
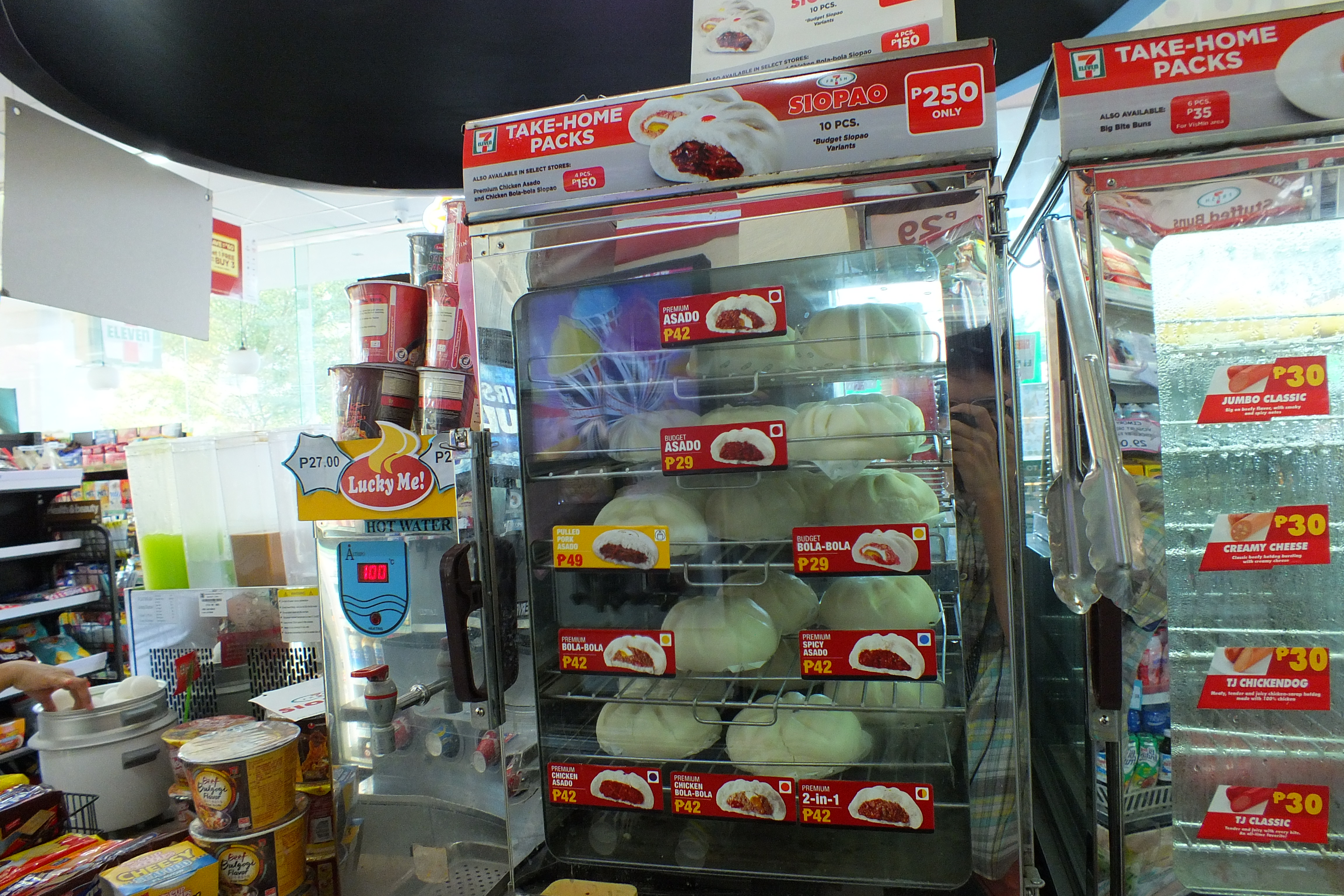
Siopao being sold at a 7-Eleven branch in Cebu City.

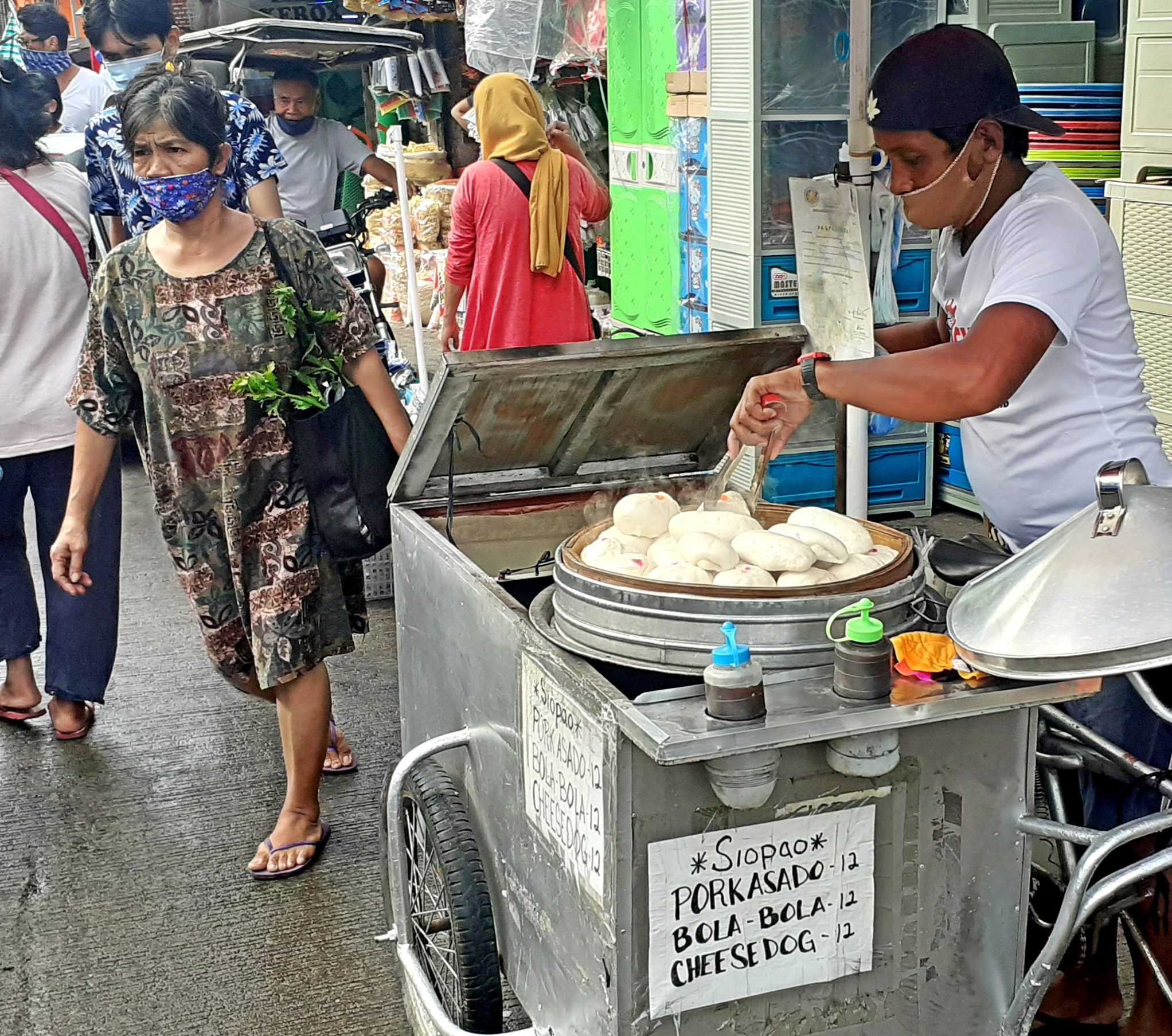
A street vendor selling siopao in Caloocan.

Siopao is derived from baozi, introduced by Hokkien Chinese immigrants to the Philippines during the Spanish colonial period. The name is derived from Philippine Hokkien sio-pau (simplified Chinese: 烧包; traditional Chinese: 燒包; Pe̍h-ōe-jī: Sio-pau; lit. 'hot bun'). Historically, the most popular siopao buns in Manila were the ones made by restaurateur Ma Mon Luk at the turn of the 20th century.

Siopao differs from baozi in that it is much larger and is eaten held in the hands like a sandwich. It also uses different traditional fillings. The most common fillings are pork asado (indigenized braised version of the Cantonese char siu) and bola-bola (literally "meatball", a combination of pork, chicken, beef, shrimp or salted duck egg). Siopao uses leavened wheat flour and is traditionally steamed, but a baked version (also called "toasted siopao") can be baked directly in ovens without steaming. A popular variant called "fried siopao" fries the bottom of the siopao in a greased skillet after steaming. Another dish that evolved from the siopao is the asado roll, which uses regular bread dough and is baked.

Traditional siopao is also typically accompanied with a sweet "siopao sauce" (made from cornstarch, soy sauce, sugar, garlic, and other ingredients), which is injected or spread unto the filling before eating. Plain ketchup (either tomato ketchup or banana ketchup) is also used in the same way, in contrast to baozi, which is eaten dipped in a soy sauce or vinegar mixture.

A unique variant from Siargao Island is the paowaw, a dessert bun which has a filling of bukayo (sweetened shredded coconut meat).

== In other countries ==
Siopao was also introduced to Guam (then a part of the Philippines), with the same name. From there it has spread further into the Marshall Islands, where it is known as siu pao.

== Similar dishes ==
There is a similar dish in Thai cuisine called salapao (Thai: ซาลาเปา), which is sometimes made with a sweet filling for a dessert. Similar buns have also been introduced in Hawaii, where it is called manapua, and in Samoa and the American Samoa, where it is called keke pua'a.

== In popular culture ==
There is an urban legend about the snack alleging that cat meat is used in the production of siopao. According to historians, this story could have come from a certain sentiment towards the Chinese Filipino community or it was theorized that it could have been a smear campaign by competitors or illegitimate children from a Chinese family which runs a siopao business.

In September 2024, during IShowSpeed's visit to the Philippines, the online streamer livestreamed himself dining at a restaurant in Binondo, where he was misled by a local into believing that the siopao he was eating contained cat meat. This caused IShowSpeed to panic, only to be reassured afterwards that it was only a joke.

== See also ==
- Asado roll
- Cha siu bao
- Bāozi, the Chinese version of the steamed bun
- Ma Mon Luk
- List of buns
- List of steamed foods
