= Shengjian mantou =

Chinese pan-fried steamed bun dish

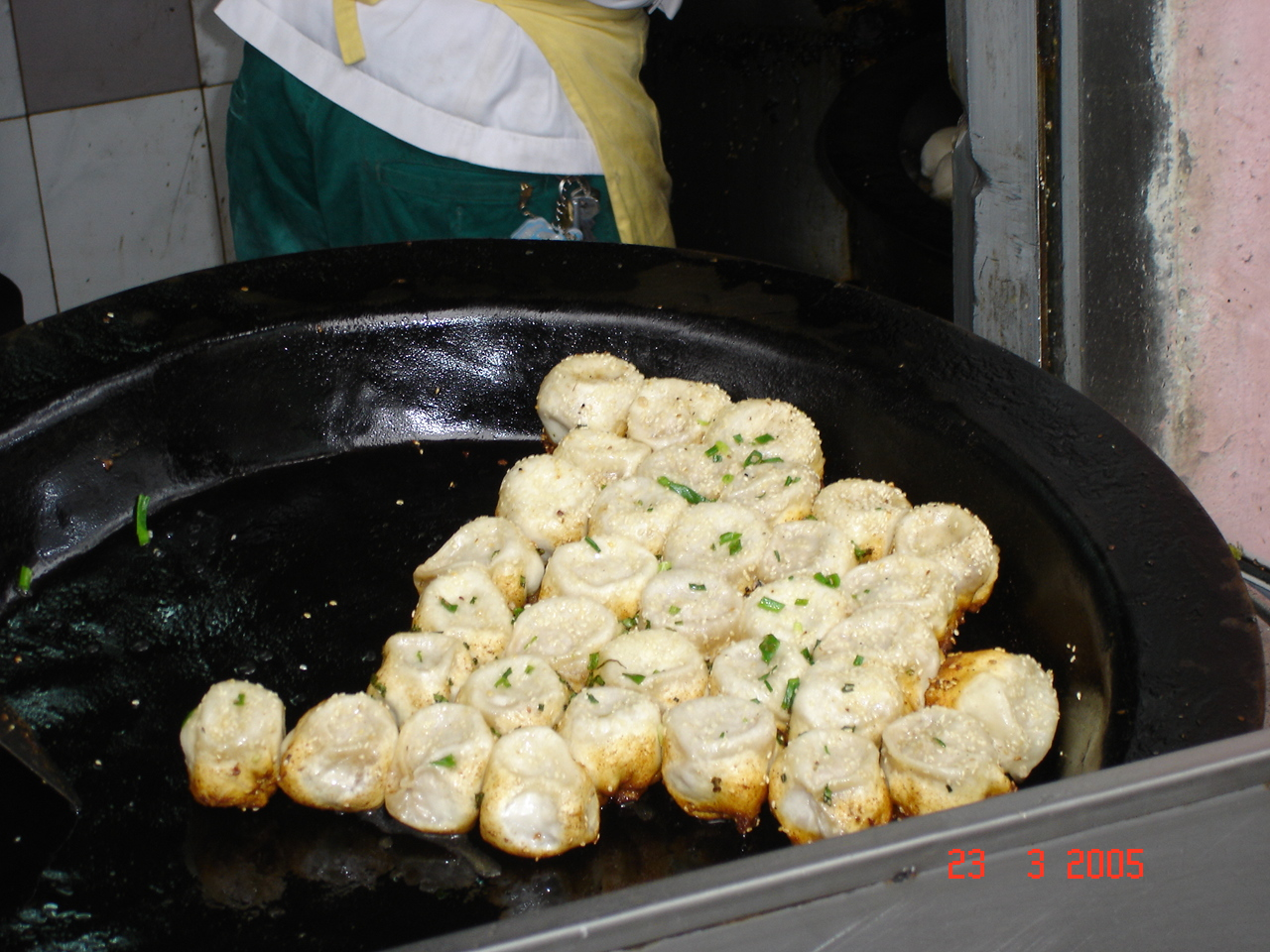
- Alternative names: Shengjian bao
- Type: Baozi
- Place of origin: Suzhou, China
- Region or state: Suzhou and Shanghai
- Main ingredients: Dough, pork, gelatin

Shengjian mantou
- Simplified Chinese: 生煎馒头
- Traditional Chinese: 生煎饅頭
- Literal meaning: raw-fried buns
Transcriptions
Standard Mandarin
- Hanyu Pinyin: shēngjiān mántou
- IPA: [ʂə́ŋtɕjɛ́n mǎntʰoʊ]
Wu
- Wugniu: san^{1} tsie^{1} moe^{6} deu^{2}
- IPA: Shanghainese: [sã˥ tɕi˧ mø˨ dɤ˩] (Note: Preferred over 生煎包.)

Alternative Chinese name
- Chinese: 生煎包
Transcriptions
Standard Mandarin
- Hanyu Pinyin: shēngjiān bāo
- IPA: [ʂə́ŋtɕjɛ́n páʊ]
Wu
- Wugniu: san^{1} tsie^{1} pau^{1}
- IPA: Shanghainese: [sã˥ tɕi˧ pɔ˨]
Yue: Cantonese
- Jyutping: saang^{1} zin^{1} baau^{1}
- IPA: [saŋ˥.tsin˥.paw˥]

Shengjian mantou (simplified Chinese: 生煎馒头; traditional Chinese: 生煎饅頭; pinyin: shēngjiān mántou; Wugniu: san^{1} tsie^{1} moe^{6} deu^{2}), shengjian bao, or shengjian for short, are small, pan-fried baozi (steamed buns) which are a specialty of Suzhou and Shanghai. The buns are typically filled with pork and gelatin that melts into liquid or soup when cooked. Within Shanghai, shengjian mantou typically have thin, crisp skins, while those sold elsewhere usually have thicker, bread-like skins. The buns originated and became popular in Suzhou at the beginning of the 20th century; their popularity spread to the Yangtze River Delta. They have been one of the most common breakfast items in Shanghai since the early 1920s.

== Naming ==
In Modern Chinese, a filled bun is usually called baozi or bao, while an unfilled (plain) bun is usually called a mantou. However, in the Jiangnan region where Wu Chinese is spoken, the word mantou refers to both filled and unfilled buns, as in Middle Chinese. Hence, the shengjian mantou is called a mantou despite being a filled bun. The same is true of the xiaolong mantou, which is often called xiaolongbao in the other varieties of Chinese.

== Ingredients ==
Shengjian is made from semi-leavened dough, wrapped around pork and gelatin fillings. Chopped green onions and sesame are placed atop the buns during the cooking process.

The name of the bun comes from its method of cooking. The buns are lined up in an oiled, shallow, flat pan. Typical commercial pans are more than a metre in diameter. The buns are lined up in the pan with the "knot", where the dough is folded together, facing downwards and thus in direct contact with the oiled pan and fried into a crispy bottom during the cooking process. Water is sprayed on the buns during cooking to ensure the top (which is not in contact with the pan or the oil) is properly cooked. After frying, the bottom of the bun becomes crunchy, and the gelatin melts into soup. This combination gives the shengjian its unique flavour. Because the buns are tightly lined up in the pan, they become somewhat cube-shaped after cooking. While waiting to be served, the chef may flip the buns so that the fried base faces upwards to prevent the crispy bottom from getting soggy in the process of cooling.

The traditional shengjian has pork fillings. Common variations include chicken, pork mixed with prawns, and pork mixed with crab meat.

== Serving ==
Shengjian are traditionally sold in lots of four (one "tael"). They are usually eaten at breakfast, and may be accompanied by a small bowl of clear soup. The buns themselves may be dipped in Chinkiang vinegar. Because of the method of cooking, especially the relatively hard bottom, the buns are durable and easily portable. They are often packed in paper bags for take-away consumption.

Some shops or restaurants sell shengjian throughout the day as a dianxin or snack. They are rarely found as a dish in a main meal.

== See also ==
- Shanghainese cuisine
- List of buns
- List of steamed foods
