= Chaogan =

Chinese pork dish

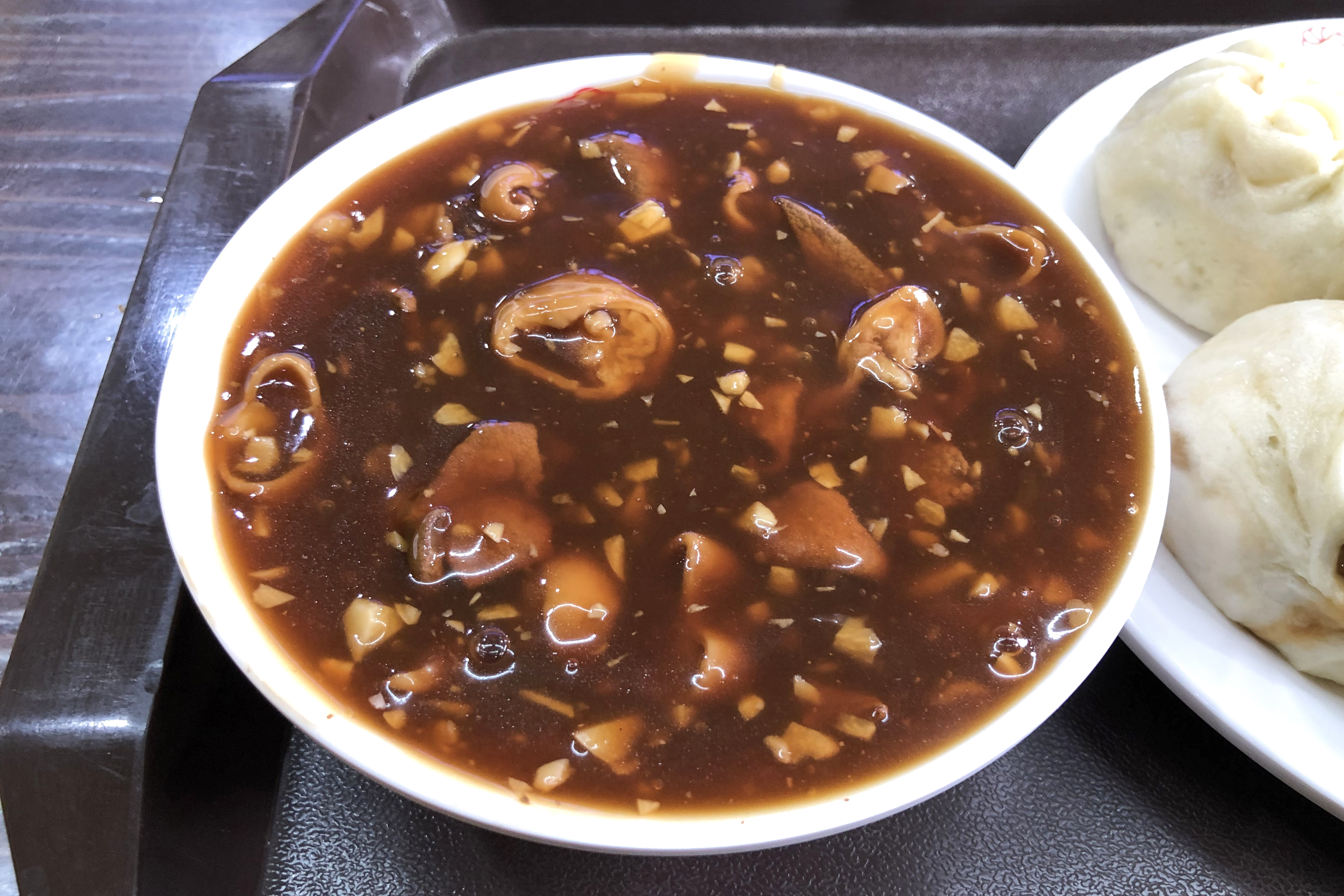
- Chaogan at a restaurant in Beijing
- Type: Snack
- Place of origin: China
- Region or state: Beijing
- Created by: Liu Baozhong (刘宝忠), Liu Baokui (刘宝奎), Yang Manqing (杨曼青) et al.
- Invented: circa 1900
- Main ingredients: Pork liver, pork intestine, starch

Chaogan (Chinese: 炒肝; pinyin: chǎogān; lit. 'stir-fried liver') is a Chinese dish which is especially famous in Beijing.

Chaogan is prepared from pork liver, pork intestine and starch, seasoning with garlic, vinegar and soy sauce. Chaogan is traditionally served with baozi.

There is a belief that chaogan was invented in Huixianju restaurant (会仙居), Beijing during the Qing Dynasty.

Although in the name there is the Chinese character "炒" (chao, lit. 'stir fry'), the dish is not cooked by stir frying, but simmering, and the name is believed to be derived from the Manchu word "colambi", which refers more broadly to cooking.
