= Asado roll =

Filipino pork-filled bread roll

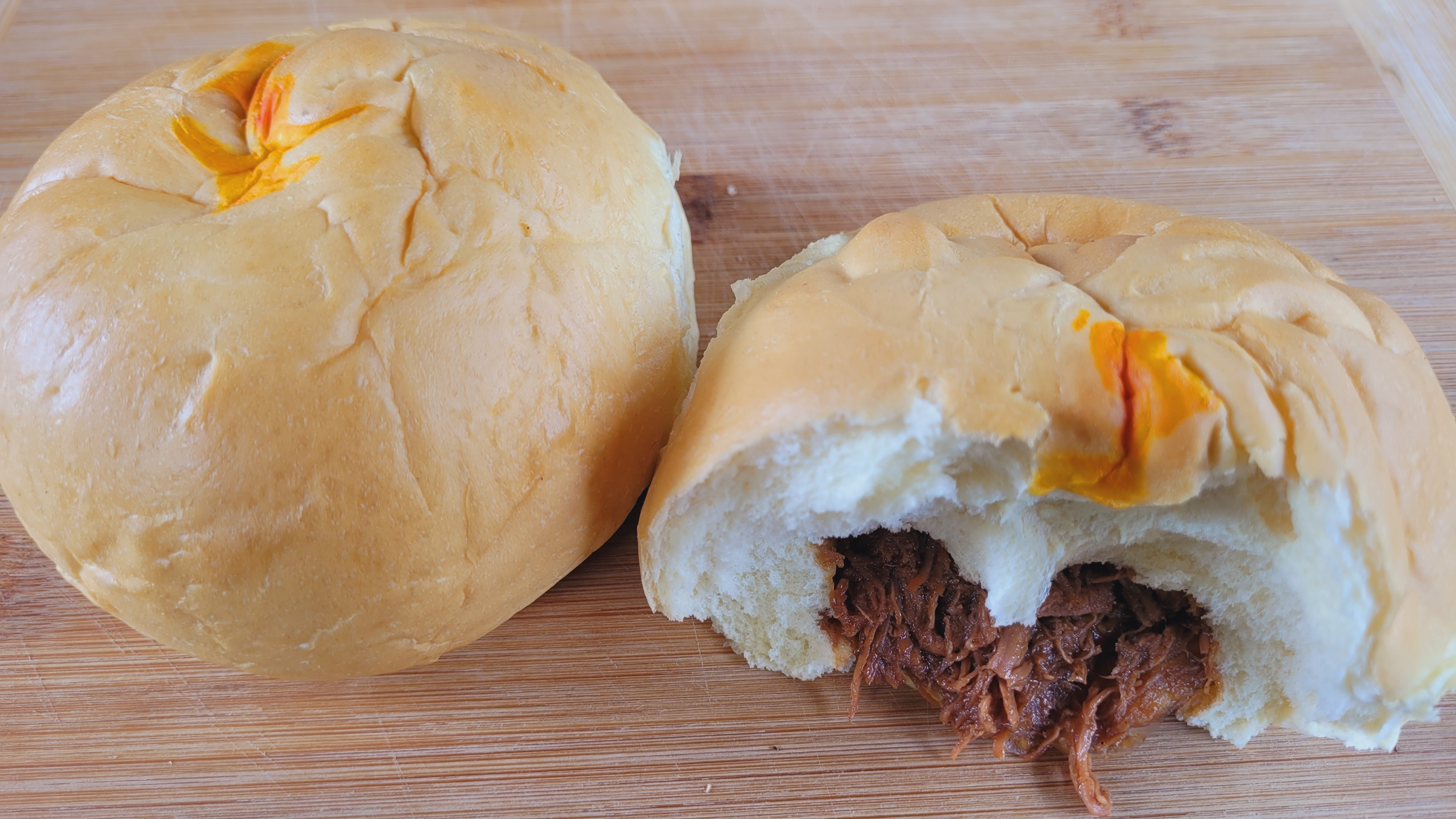
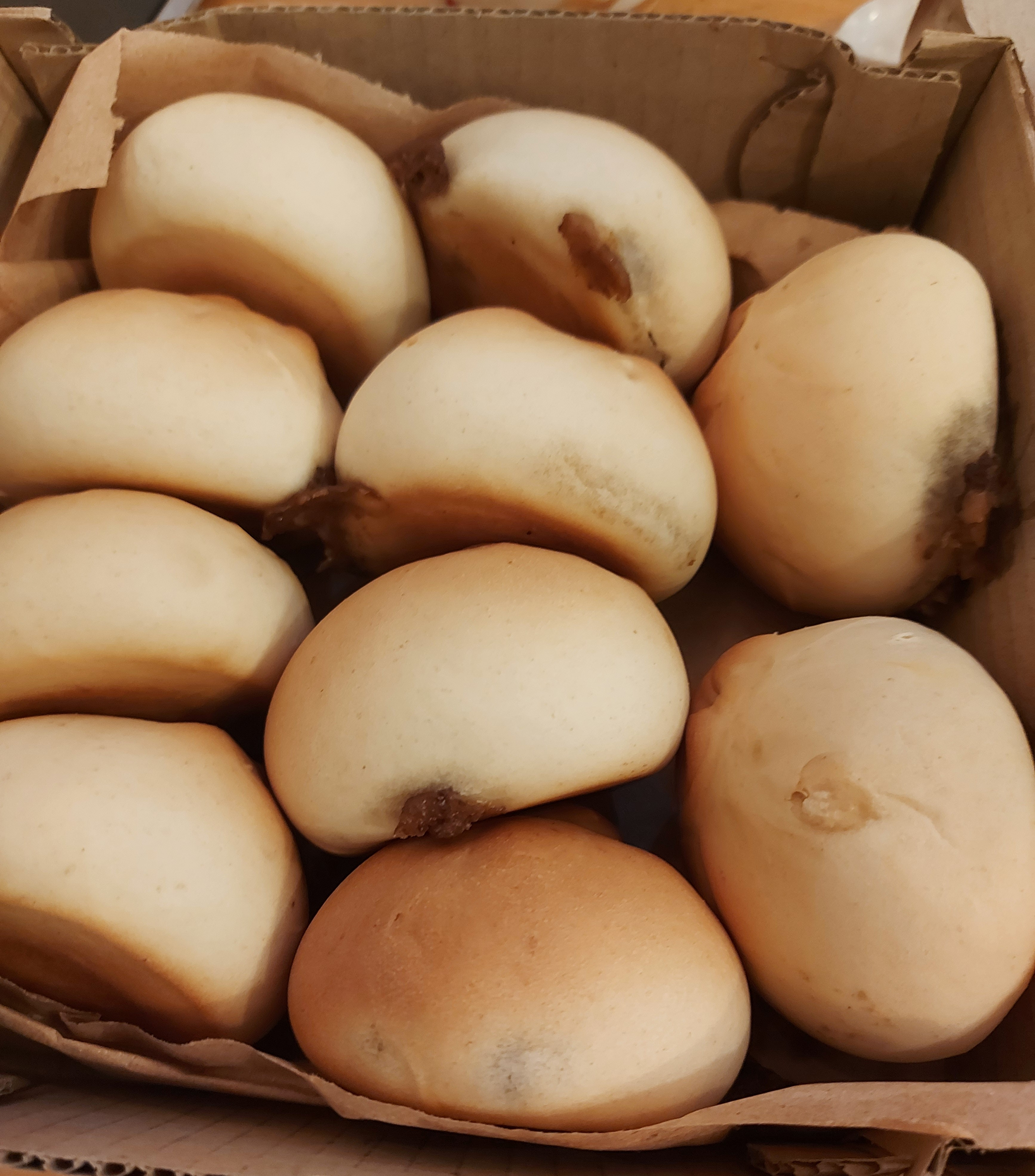
- Top: Asado roll showing the pork asado fillings; Bottom: A box of asado rolls
- Alternative names: Baked siopao, baked pork buns, asado buns, asado bread roll
- Type: Bread roll
- Place of origin: Philippines

Asado rolls, also called asado buns or baked siopao, is a bread roll of Filipino origin filled with savory-sweet pork asado. It is similar to the asado siopao except it is baked (not steamed). The top can either be covered with an egg wash, bread crumbs, or sprinkled with sesame seeds.

== See also ==
- Pan de coco
