= Jjinppang =

Korean stuffed steamed bun

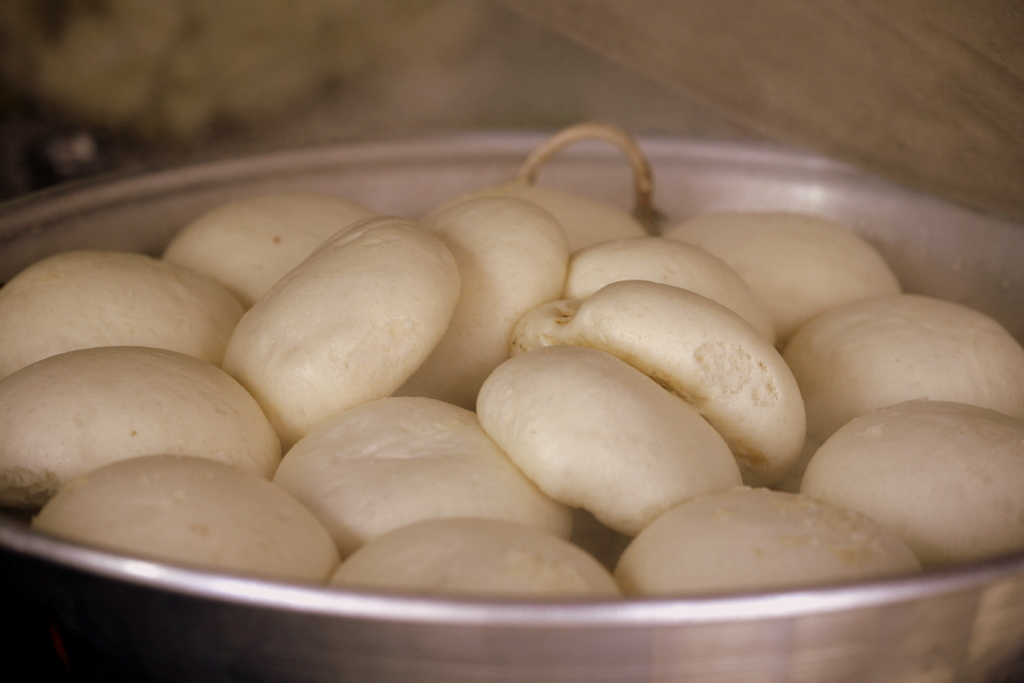
- Alternative names: Steamed bun
- Place of origin: Korea
- Associated cuisine: Korean cuisine
- Serving temperature: Hot
- Main ingredients: Wheat flour, red bean paste
- Ingredients generally used: Yeast from makgeolli, butter, salt, sugar
- Variations: Hoppang
- Food energy (per 1 serving): 177 kcal (740 kJ)
- Similar dishes: Liánróngbāo; Begodya

Korean name
- Hangul: 찐빵
- RR: jjinppang
- MR: tchinppang
- IPA: [t͈ɕin.p͈aŋ]

Jjinppang (찐빵; lit. '"steamed bread"') is a steamed bun, typically filled with red bean paste with bits of broken beans and bean husk. Traditional jjinppang is made of sourdough fermented using the yeast in makgeolli (rice wine), but younger varieties such as hoppang are often made without fermentation. Warm jjinppang is softer than baked breads due to the higher moisture content, but it hardens as it cools. Thus, it is recommended to eat while the bun is still hot. Hardened jjinppang can be steamed again before being eaten.

Jjinppang is a specialty product of Anheung Township in Hoengseong County, Gangwon Province. In the township, there is Anheung Jjinppang Village with 17 steameries that make Anheung-jjinppang (안흥찐빵). Since 1999, the township also hosts Anheung Jjinppang Festival in every October.

== Varieties ==
- Anheung-jjinppang – a variety of jjinppang made in the traditional way, using sourdough fermented with the yeast from makgeolli; a specialty of Anheung.
- Gamgyul-jjinppang – mandarin orange jjinppang, made and sold in Jeju Island. The orange-colored dough is made with mandarin orange.
- Hoppang – a variety of jjinppang filled with sweeter and smoother red bean paste, passed through a sieve to remove bean skins.

== Similar foods ==
Jjinppang is similar to sweet varieties of Chinese steamed buns, baozi, but in Korean cuisine Chinese-style baozi are more commonly associated with mandu (dumplings) because many types resemble wang-mandu (king dumplings, with wang meaning "king" in the sense of large size). Unlike Chinese baozi, which may contain either sweet or savory fillings, wang-mandu are typically prepared with savory mandu fillings. In Korean culinary classification, steamed buns with sweet fillings such as jjinppang and hoppang are not considered mandu and are instead categorized separately. A descendant of wang-mandu in Koryo-saram cuisine (the cuisine of Koreans of the former Soviet Union) is known as begodya.

== See also ==
- Baozi
- Bungeo-ppang
- Dampfnudel
- Hotteok
- List of buns
- List of steamed foods
- List of stuffed dishes
