= Baozi =

Chinese filled bun

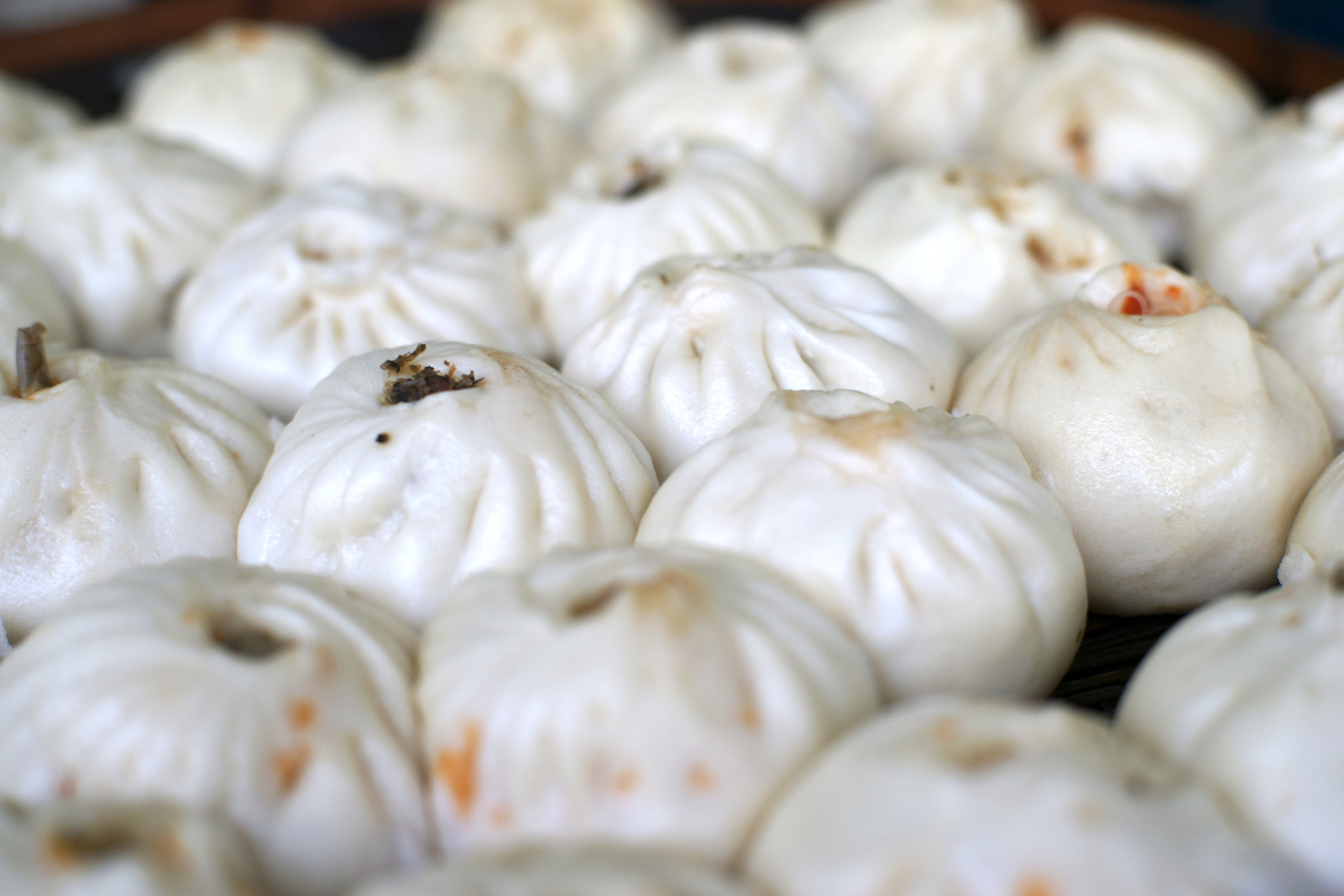
- Meat-filled baozi for sale in a market
- Alternative names: Bao, pau, paotzu
- Type: Filled steamed bread
- Course: Breakfast, snack
- Place of origin: China

Chinese name
- Chinese: 包子
Transcriptions
Standard Mandarin
- Hanyu Pinyin: bāozi
- Bopomofo: ㄅㄠ ㄗ˙
- Wade–Giles: pao^{1}-tzu
- Tongyong Pinyin: bao-zih
- IPA: [páʊ.tsɹ̩]
Southern Min
- Hokkien POJ: pau-á
- Tâi-lô: pau-á

Alternative Chinese name
- Chinese: 包
Transcriptions
Yue: Cantonese
- Jyutping: baau1
- IPA: [paw˥]
Southern Min
- Hokkien POJ: pau
- Tâi-lô: pau

Baozi (Chinese: 包子), or simply bao, is a type of yeast-leavened filled bun in various Chinese cuisines. There are many variations in fillings (meat or vegetarian) and preparations, though the buns are most often made from wheat flour and steamed. They are a variation of mantou from Northern China.

Baozi are popular throughout China and have even made their way into the cuisines of many other countries through the Chinese diaspora.

== History and etymology ==
Baozi were originally called mantou, and may be related to the Central Asian dumpling manti.

During the Western Jin Dynasty (266–316), Shu Xi wrote about dumplings and other wheat-based foods (at the time called bing), which he believed were from the Han dynasty (202 BC – 220 AD) or later. He described mantou as large meat-filled dumplings eaten at spring banquets. Other early sources mention the use of mantou in rituals.

In the Tang dynasty (618–907), mantou were small leavened filled buns eaten as dianxin. In the Song dynasty (960–1279), mantou could have a variety of fillings (meat, poultry, fish, vegetables) and were said to be a common snack for students. During this period, baozi emerged as an alternate word for mantou, and subsequently mantou could also be used for unfilled buns. According to a legend first recorded in the Song dynasty, Zhuge Liang invented mantou to substitute for human heads in a sacrifice to gods. In the Mongol-led Yuan dynasty (1271–1368), court recipes for baozi and mantou included Central Asian elements with fillings such as lamb, onions, ginger, and chenpi.

By the Qing dynasty (1664–1911), the words had settled into their modern meanings: bing are baked or steamed wheat cakes, baozi are buns with fillings, mantou are steamed buns without fillings, and jiao are thin-skinned dumplings with fillings. There is some regional variation in usage, mainly near Shanghai where small filled steamed dumplings are called mantou in Wu Chinese.

The Legend

There was a legend about a man named Zhuge Liang who was a military leader in China. For the barbarians to let him use this bridge, he had to sacrifice 50 of his soldiers and throw their heads into the river. Instead, in a clever deception, he fooled the barbarians by tossing 50 baos that looked like human heads into the river.

== Types ==
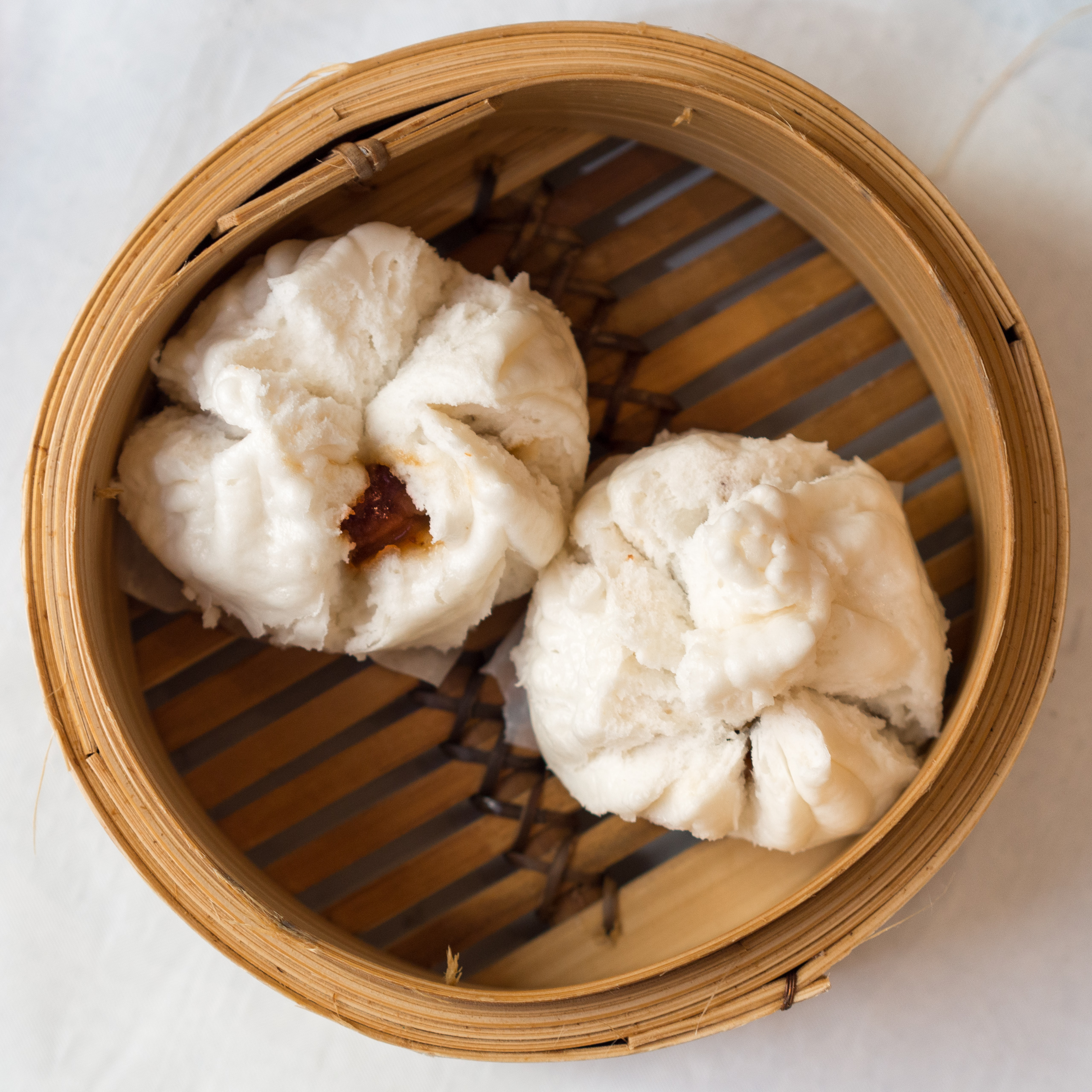
Char siu bao

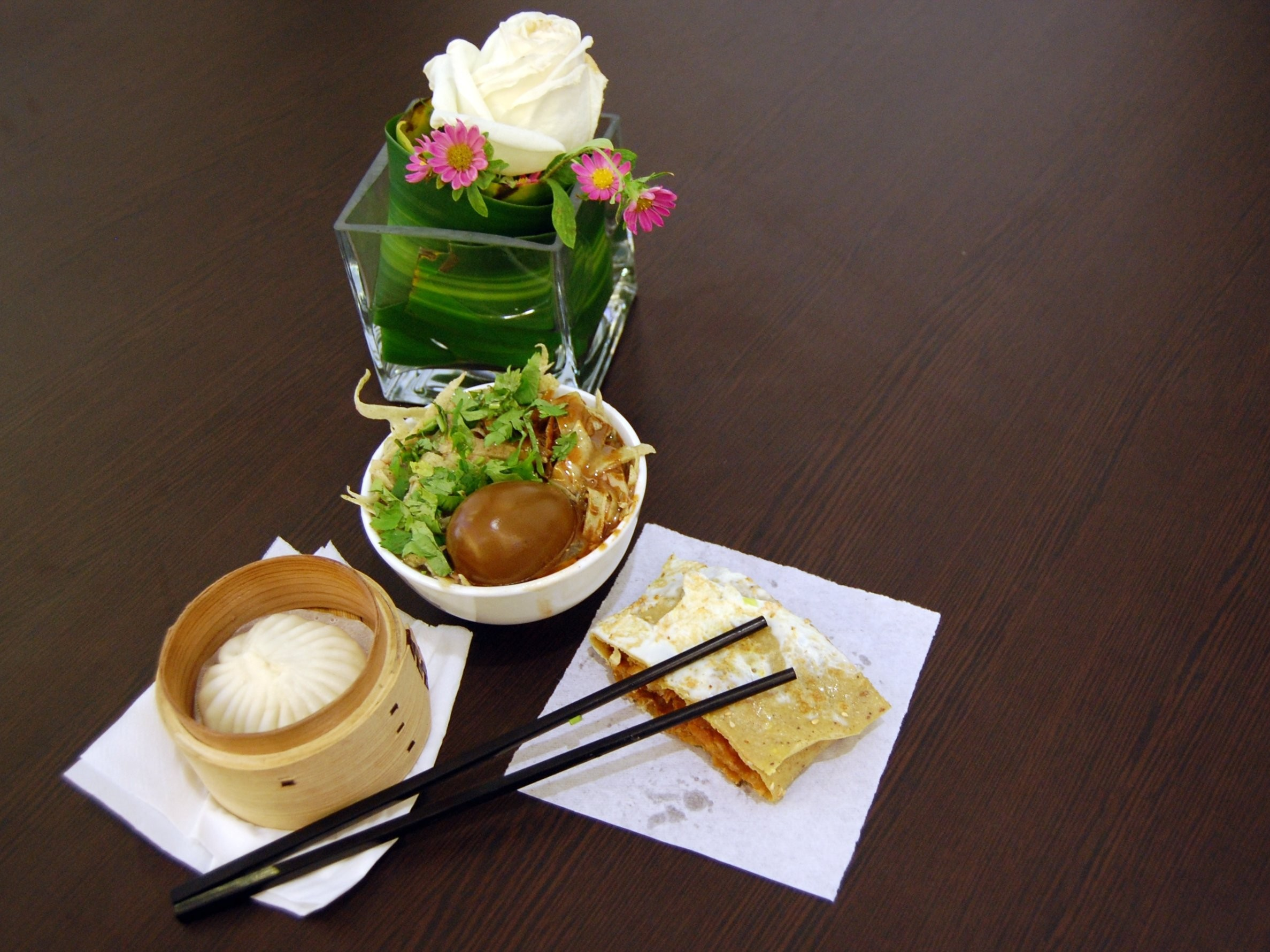
Tianjin Goubuli

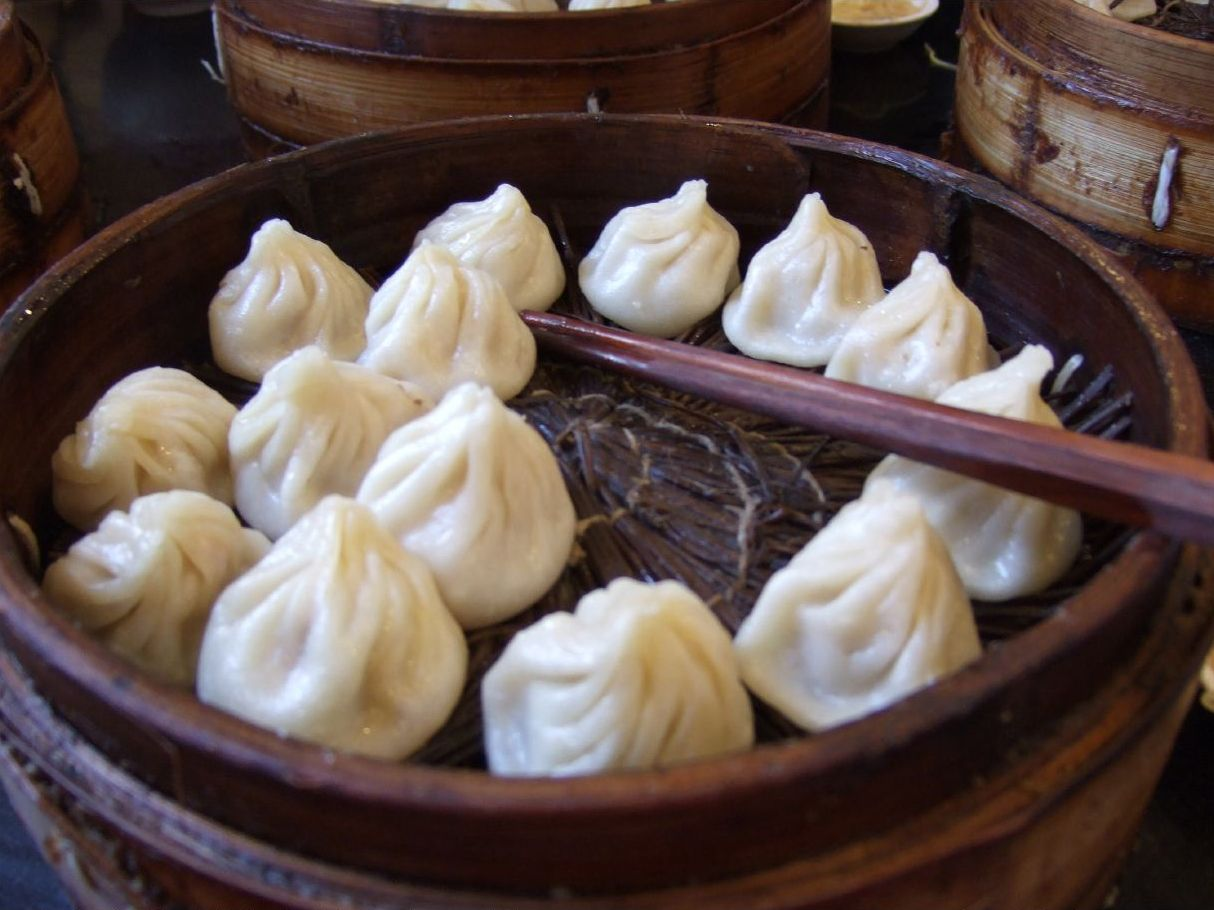
Shanghai xiaolongbao

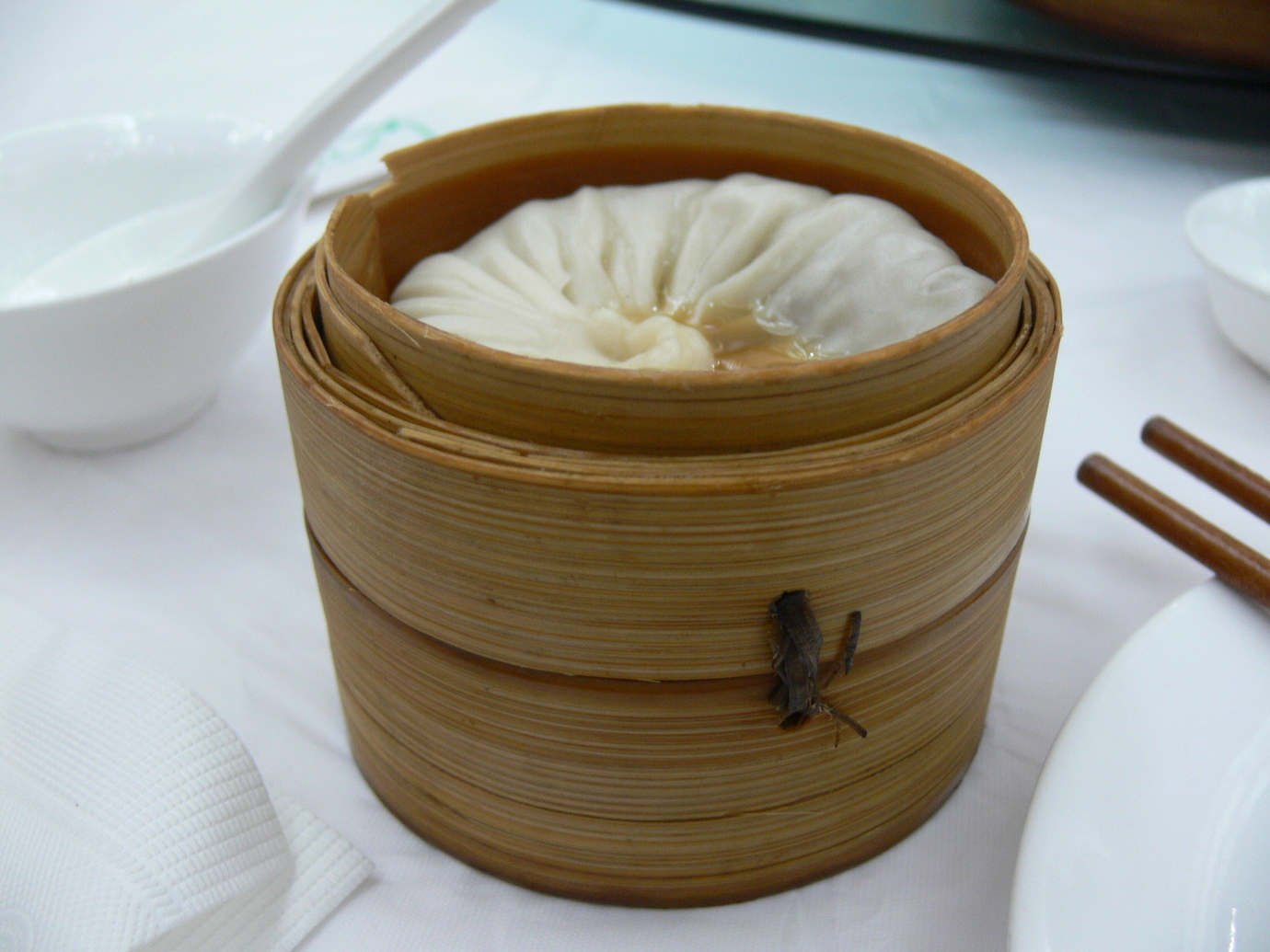
Tangbao in Yangzhou

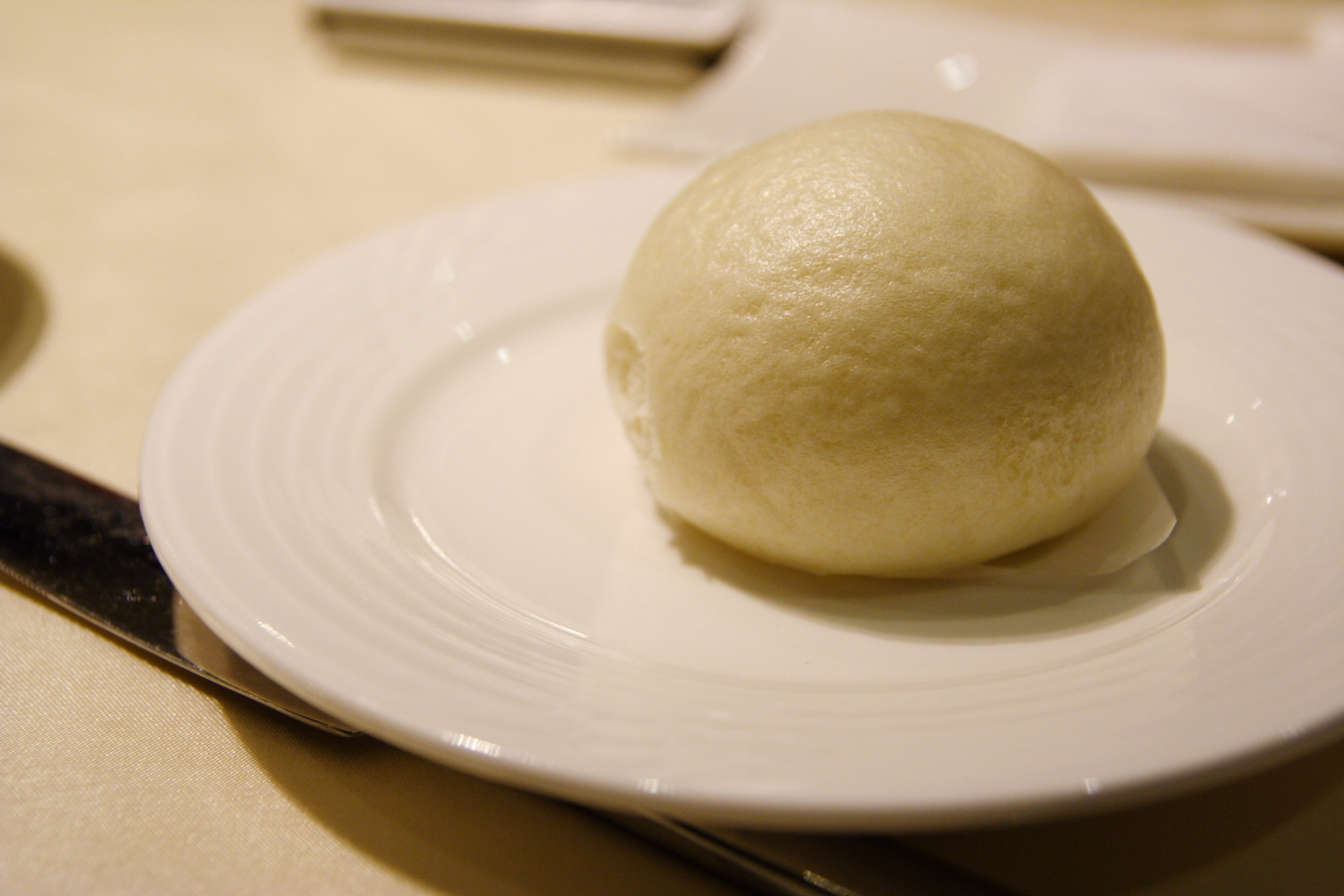
Naihuangbao

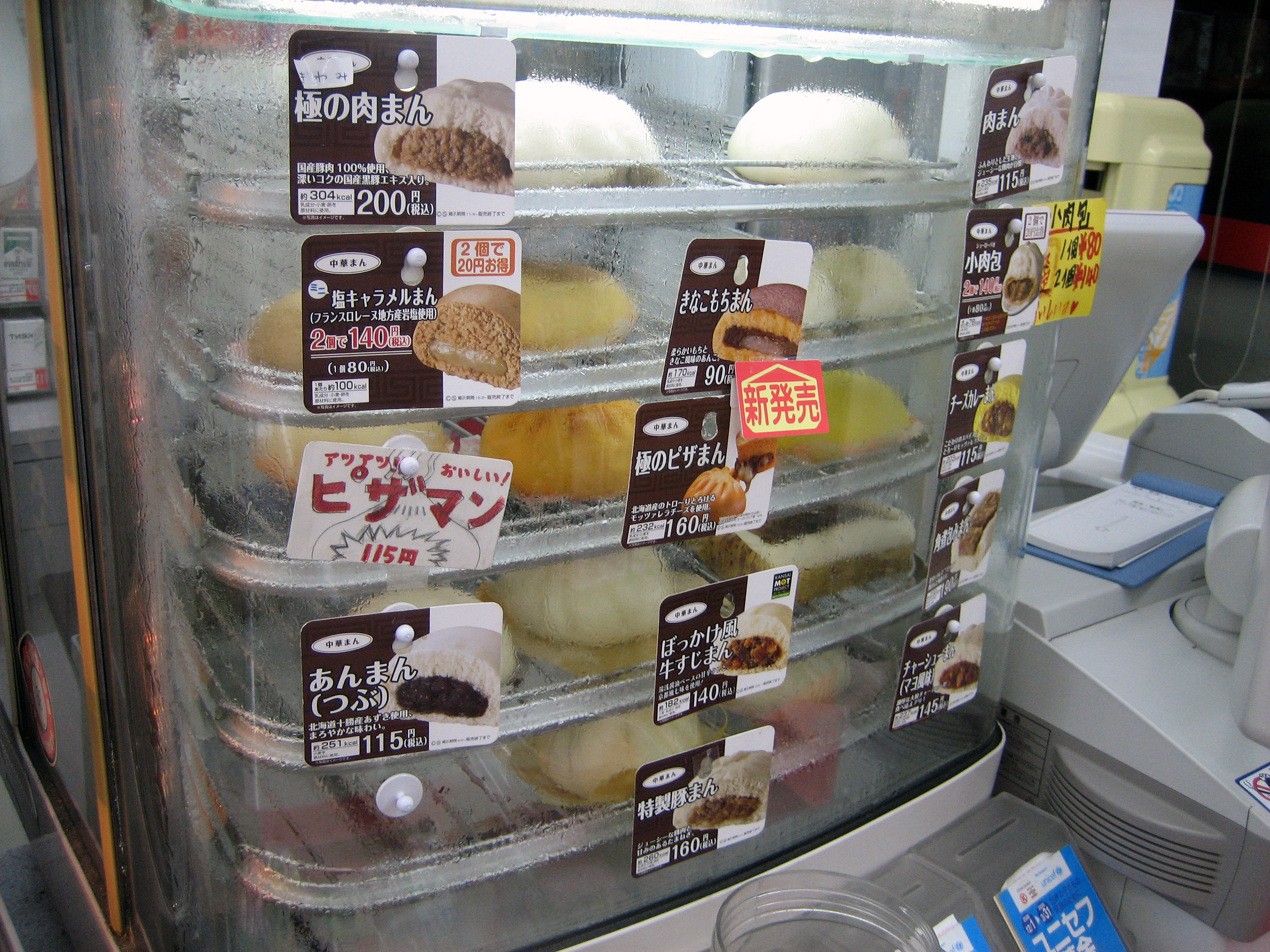
Japanese variations

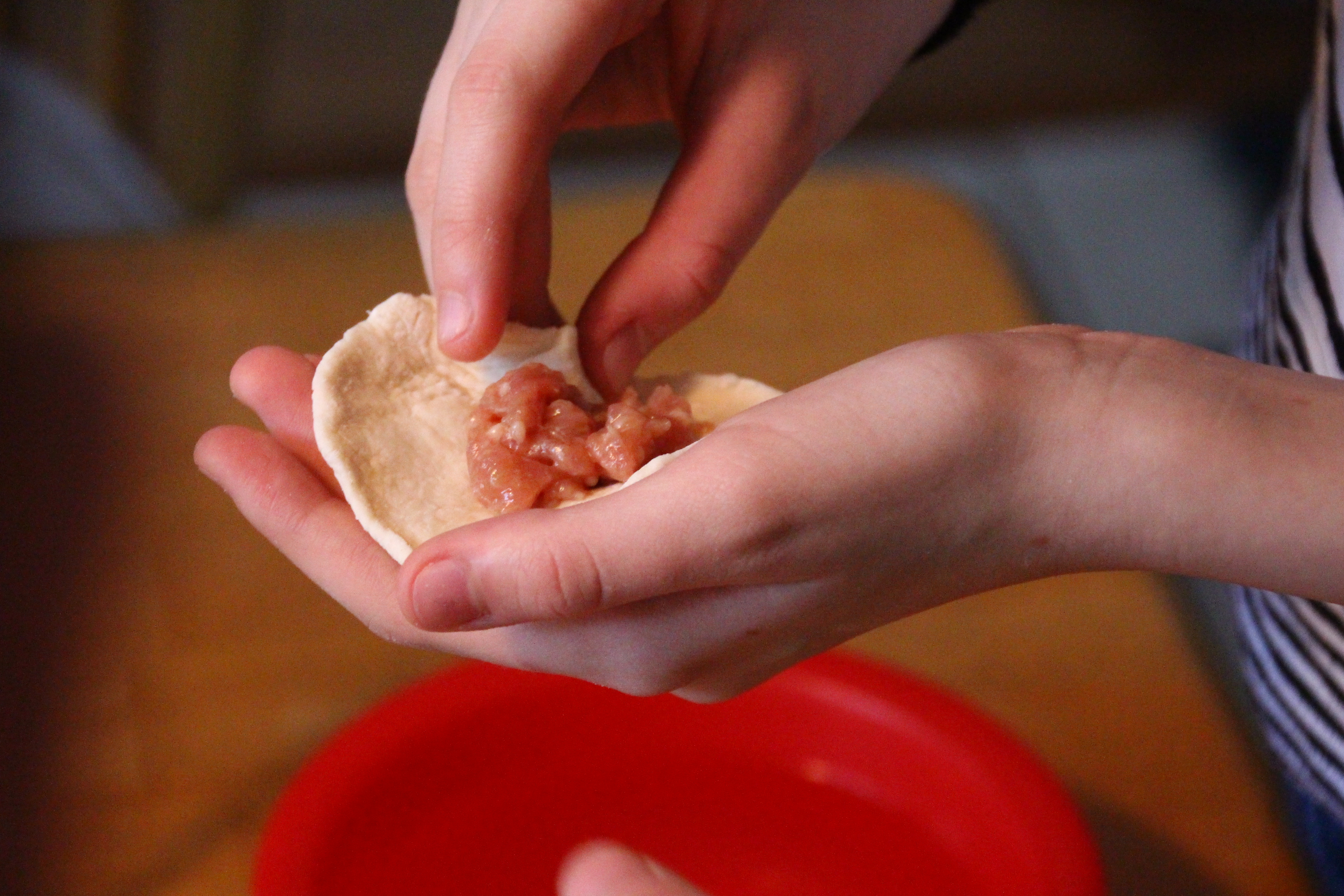
Making of baozi

English name	Chinese name (with romanisation)	Other names	Description
Meicai pork belly bao bun	梅菜扣肉包 méi cài kòu ròu bāo		Steamed buns, folded like tacos, are stuffed with slices of braised pork belly flavored with dried mustard greens.
Cha siu bao, charsiu bau	叉燒包 chāshāobāo / Yue Chinese: caa1 siu1 baau1	in Hawaii manapua, in the Philippines siopao	Filled with char siu (barbecued pork).
Goubuli	狗不理 gǒu bù lǐ		A brand of baozi considered characteristic of Tianjin.
Xiaolongbao	小籠包/小笼包 xiǎo lóng bāo		A small, meat-filled baozi from Shanghai containing an aspic that reverts to a juicy broth when cooked. Because it is succulent and prepared with thin, partially leavened dough, it more closely resembles a jiaozi than a baozi.
Shuijianbao	水煎包 shuǐjiānbāo		Very similar to xiaolongbao, but pan-fried instead of steamed.
Shengjian mantou	生煎饅頭/生煎馒头 shēngjiān mántou		A small, meat-filled, fried baozi from Shanghai.
Tangbao	湯包/汤包 tāngbāo		A large soup-filled baozi from Yangzhou drunk through a straw; in other areas of China, it is small in size with a rich soup.
Doushabao	豆沙包 dòushābāo	Hokkien: tāu-se-pau	Filled with sweet bean paste.
Lotus seed bun	蓮蓉包/莲蓉包 liánróngbāo		Filled with sweetened lotus seed paste.
Kaya-baozi	咖央包子	Malay: pau kaya	Filled with kaya, a jam made from coconut, eggs, and sometimes pandan in Indonesia, Malaysia, and Singapore.
Naihuangbao	奶黃包/奶黄包 nǎihuángbāo		Filled with sweet yellow custard.
Siopao	燒包 sio-pau	Filipino/Tagalog: siyopaw	Steamed, filled with either chicken, pork, shrimp or salted egg.
Zhimabao	芝麻包 zhīmabāo		Steamed, filled with a black sesame paste.
Yacaibao	芽菜包 yá cài bāo		Steamed, filled with a type of pickle, spices and possibly other vegetables or meat, common in Sichuan, China.
Bah-pau'm	肉包 ròu bāo	Indonesian: bakpau / bakpao Javanese: ꦧꦏ꧀ꦥꦲꦸ, romanized: bakpau Dutch: bapao	Filled with minced pork, or alternatively chocolate, strawberry, cheese, mung bean, red bean, minced beef, or diced chicken.
Da bao	大包 dà bāo		Large buns filled with pork, eggs and other ingredients.
Crisp stuffed bun	破酥包 poshubao		A lard-layered bun with pork, lard, bamboo shoot, and soy sauce, or with the filling of Yunnan ham and white sugar or brown sugar. Crisp stuffed buns were created by a chef from Yuxi almost a hundred years ago.
Tandoori baozi	烤包子; Kao baozi	Uyghur: سامسا самса Samsa	A Uyghur specialty, cooked in a tandoor instead of being steamed. Usually filled with lamb, potatoes, and spices.
Gua bao	Min Nan: 割包, romanized: koah-pau,	Min Nan: 虎咬豬, romanized: hó͘-kā-ti	Made by folding over flat steamed dough, with a wide variety of fillings. Originated as Fujianese street food.

== Outside of China ==
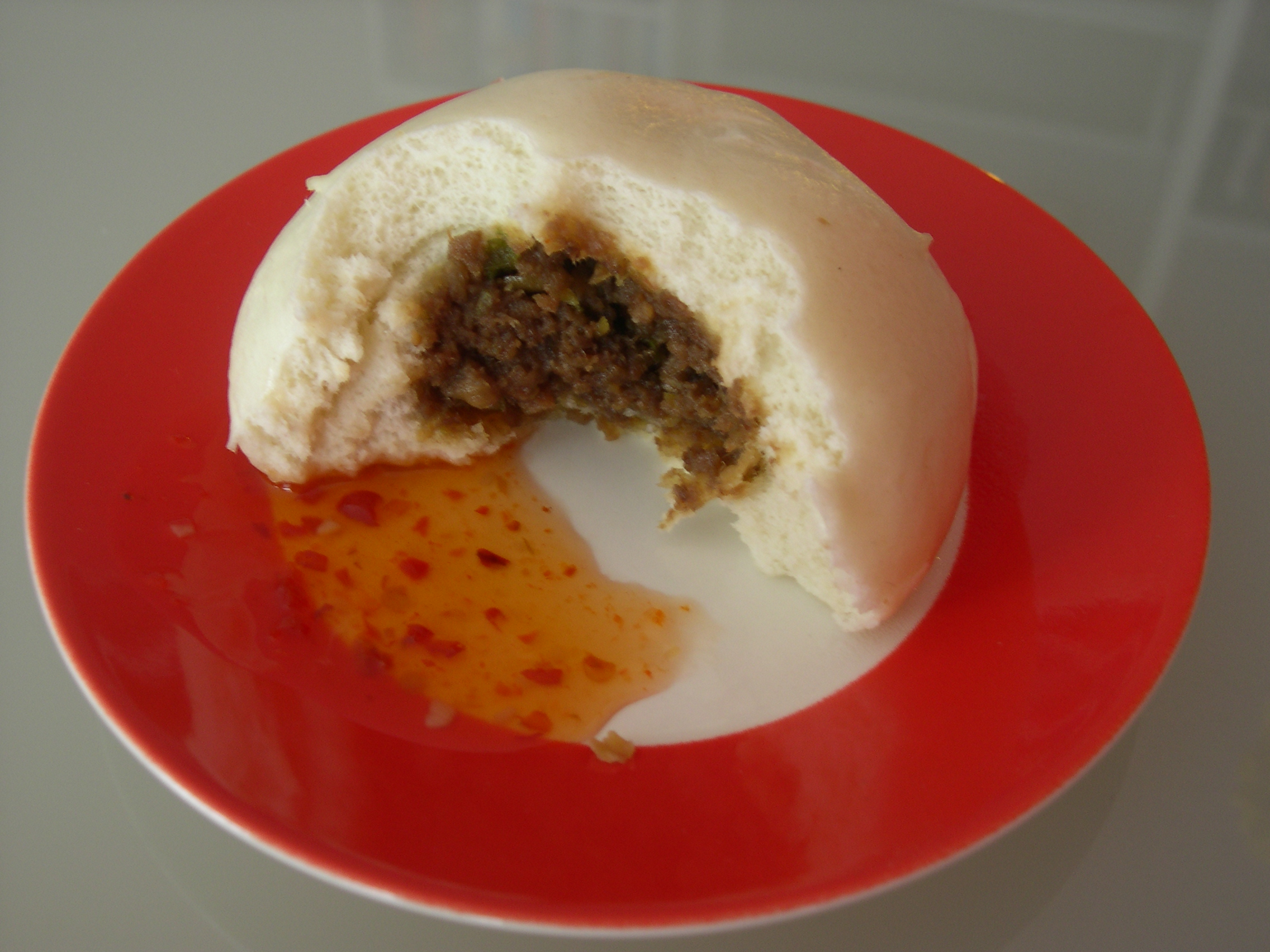
Broken-open bakpau showing minced meat filling, served with sweet chili sauce

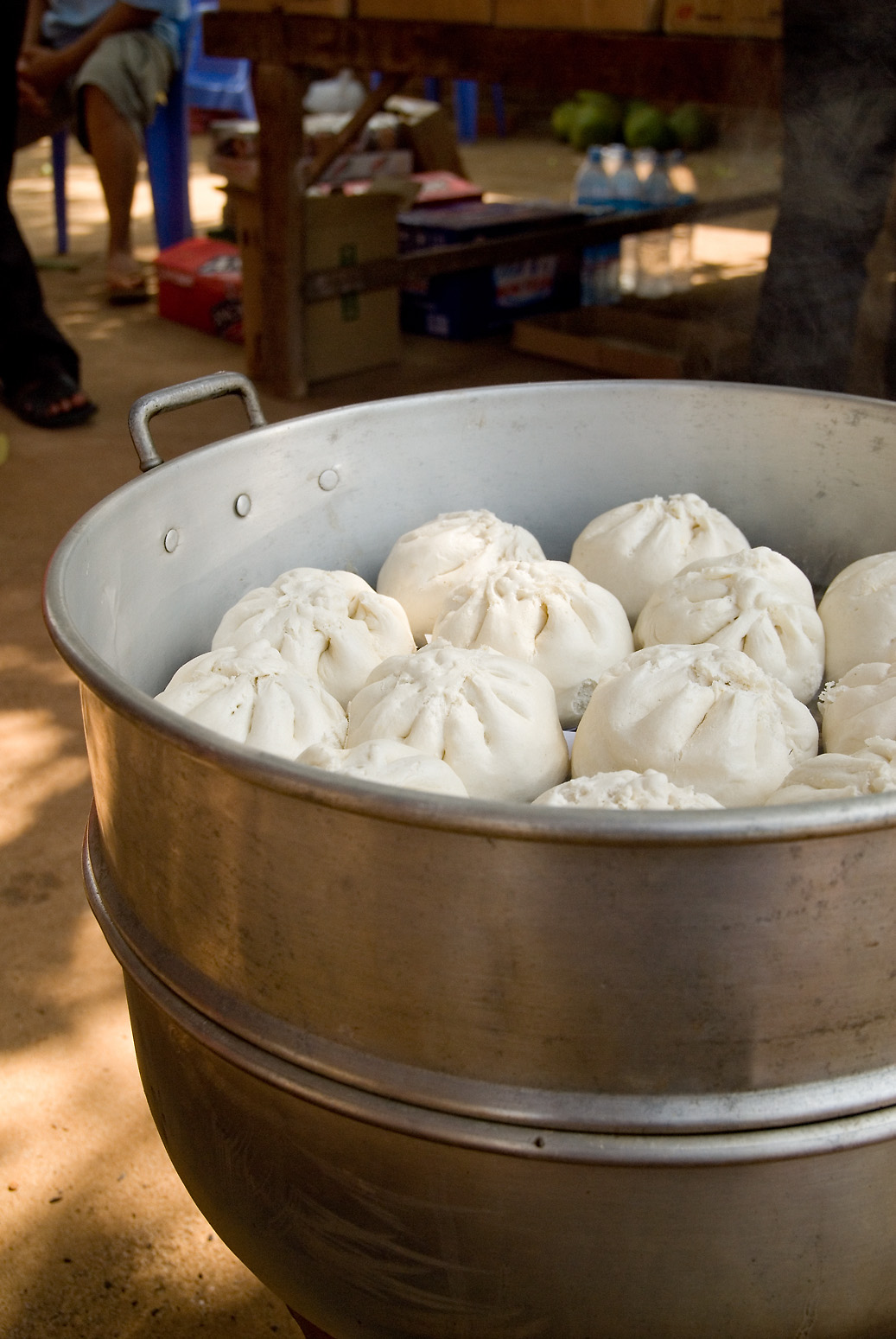
Cambodian Chinese num pao

In many Chinese cultures, these buns are a popular food, and widely available. While they can be eaten at any meal, baozi are often eaten for breakfast. They are also popular as a portable snack or meal.

The dish has also become commonplace throughout various regions of Northeast Asia with cultural and ethnic relationships, as well as Southeast Asia and outside Asia due to longstanding Chinese immigration.

- In Buryatia and Mongolia, variants of the recipe, often with beef or lamb, are known as buuz and buuza.
- In Malaysia, given the long history of the Chinese diaspora in Malaysia before the British colonial times, the Malays have adopted these buns (called pau in Malay) as their own with halal fillings particularly with curry (potato, chicken, or beef) similar to curry puffs; some variants have a quail egg in the middle, in addition. Other variations include sweet fillings of coconut jam (kaya) or red bean paste. These pau can be found sold in stalls by the roadside, at night markets, highway rest stops, and pasar Ramadan (Ramadan food bazaars).
- In Indonesia, the dish has also been adopted into Indonesian cuisine through the integration of Chinese culture. It has been adopted through the Hokkien language name of bakpau or bakpao. In addition to meat fillings, local variants include: chocolate, sweet potato, and marmalade fillings. Bakpau is found in Indonesia as a take away food sold by cart street hawkers. Bakpau in Indonesia is usually sold in dabao size (lit.: "big pau"), around 10 cm in diameter. To accommodate the dietary restrictions of Indonesia's Muslim majority, the original pork filling has been replaced with minced beef, diced chicken, or even sweet mung bean paste and red bean paste. Pau with non-meat fillings are still called bakpau by Indonesians, despite the lack of meat. It is usually served with sweet chili sauce.
- In the Netherlands, due to the influence from Indonesia, supermarkets typically stock what the Dutch refer to as bapao—or occasionally, bakpao. It is easy to find frozen bapao or bakpao—or, in larger supermarkets, refrigerated versions—wrapped in plastic and ready to be heated in the microwave. The most common filling is chicken, although pork, beef, and vegetarian variants are also widely available. This food is classified as a quick snack or a fast-food item. Freshly baked versions of this steamed bun do not constitute a staple food in the Netherlands, except within the country's resident Chinese community.
- In the Philippines, the local version of baozi called siopao was brought by Chinese immigrants (Sangleys) prior to Spanish colonialism. Varieties of Filipino siopao fillings include barbecued pork, meatballs, flaked tuna, and sometimes chocolate and cheese.
- In Thailand, a similar bun is called salapao (ซาลาเปา).
- In Japan, baozi is very popular and known as chūkaman (中華まん, '"Chinese steamed bun"'). Nikuman (肉まん; derived from 肉饅頭, nikumanjū) is the Japanese name for Chinese baozi with meat fillings. Chūkaman are steamed and often sold as street food. During festivals, they are frequently sold and eaten. From approximately August or September, throughout the winter months, and until roughly early April, chūkaman are available in convenience stores, where they are kept warm.
- In Korea, there are two varieties of dumplings similar to baozi. One variety, a longtime staple at Korean-style Chinese restaurants, is known simply as jjinmandu, or "steamed mandu", which is typically savory and comes with meat, vegetable, and noodle fillings. Another variation is a warm snack food consisting of a completely round bun usually filled with smooth, sweetened red bean paste but also commonly sold stuffed with vegetables and meat, pizza toppings, pumpkin, or buldak. This is known as jjinppang (steamed bread or bun) or hoppang (a convenience-food version of the former).
- In Cambodia, num pao (Khmer: នំប៉ាវ), is a popular street food.
- In Vietnam, Bánh bao is the Vietnamese version of the Cantonese tai bao that was brought over by Chinese immigrants. It is usually filled with pork, mushrooms, hard-boiled eggs, and sausage.
- In Myanmar, pauk-si (ပေါက်စီ) is a popular snack available in almost every traditional tea shop.
- In Mauritius, many dishes are influenced by Sino-Mauritians; this includes baozi, simply referred to as "pao" (sometimes written as "pow" or "paw"). They are typically filled with Chinese sausage, poultry, black mushroom, and soy egg, among others.
- In Trinidad and Tobago it is known as pow and is a popular street food.

== See also ==
- List of buns
- List of steamed foods
- Manapua
- Bao (film)
