= Hoppang =

South Korean steamed bread

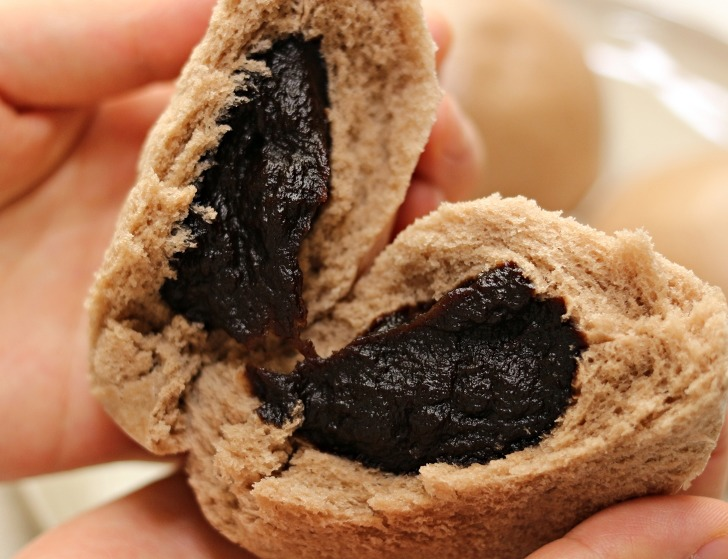
- Type: Jjinppang
- Place of origin: South Korea
- Serving temperature: Hot
- Main ingredients: Wheat flour, red bean paste
- Ingredients generally used: butter, salt, sugar
- Food energy (per 108 g serving): 200 kcal (840 kJ)

Korean name
- Hangul: 호빵
- RR: hoppang
- MR: hoppang
- IPA: [ho.p͈aŋ]

Hoppang (Korean: 호빵; lit. hot bread) is a warm snack that is sold throughout South Korea. It is a convenience food version of jjinppang (steamed bread) and is typically filled with smooth, sweetened red bean paste.

== History ==
The hoppang was invented by Heo Chang-seong, founder of Samlip Foods. In 1969, during a visit to Japan, he saw steamed buns known as chūkaman, a Japanese variant of the Chinese baozi, being sold on the street and was inspired. He had been searching for a product to boost sales during the bakery industry's slow winter season. After experimenting with recipes, the hoppang was introduced to the Korean market in 1971.

== Etymology ==
Hoppang was a brand name for the ready-to-eat jjinppang developed by Samlip in 1970, which combined the onomatopoeia ho, ho (the sound for blowing on hot steamed bun) and ppang, the Korean word for bread. Also it has meaning of 'The whole family eats together and smiles; Ho ho'. The brand name soon became the generic name for convenience jjinppang.

== Varieties ==
Typical hoppang is filled with sweetened red bean paste, but it is also commonly sold stuffed with vegetables and meat, pizza toppings, pumpkin, or buldak.

Steamer- or microwave-ready hoppang is often packaged in multiples at supermarkets and grocery stores, while many convenience stores sell hoppang throughout the winter months in cylindrical heating cabinets designed to steam and keep them warm.

== Gallery ==
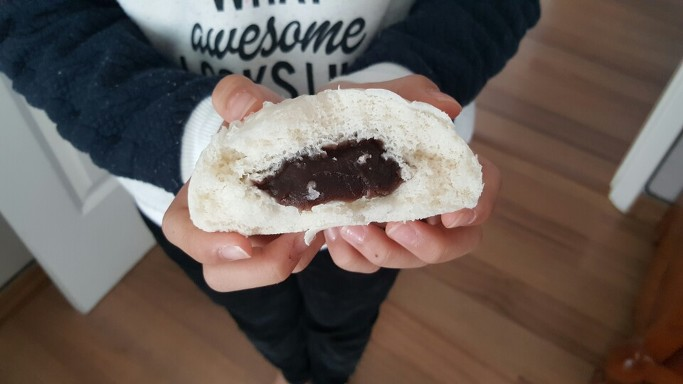
Hoppang filled with red bean paste

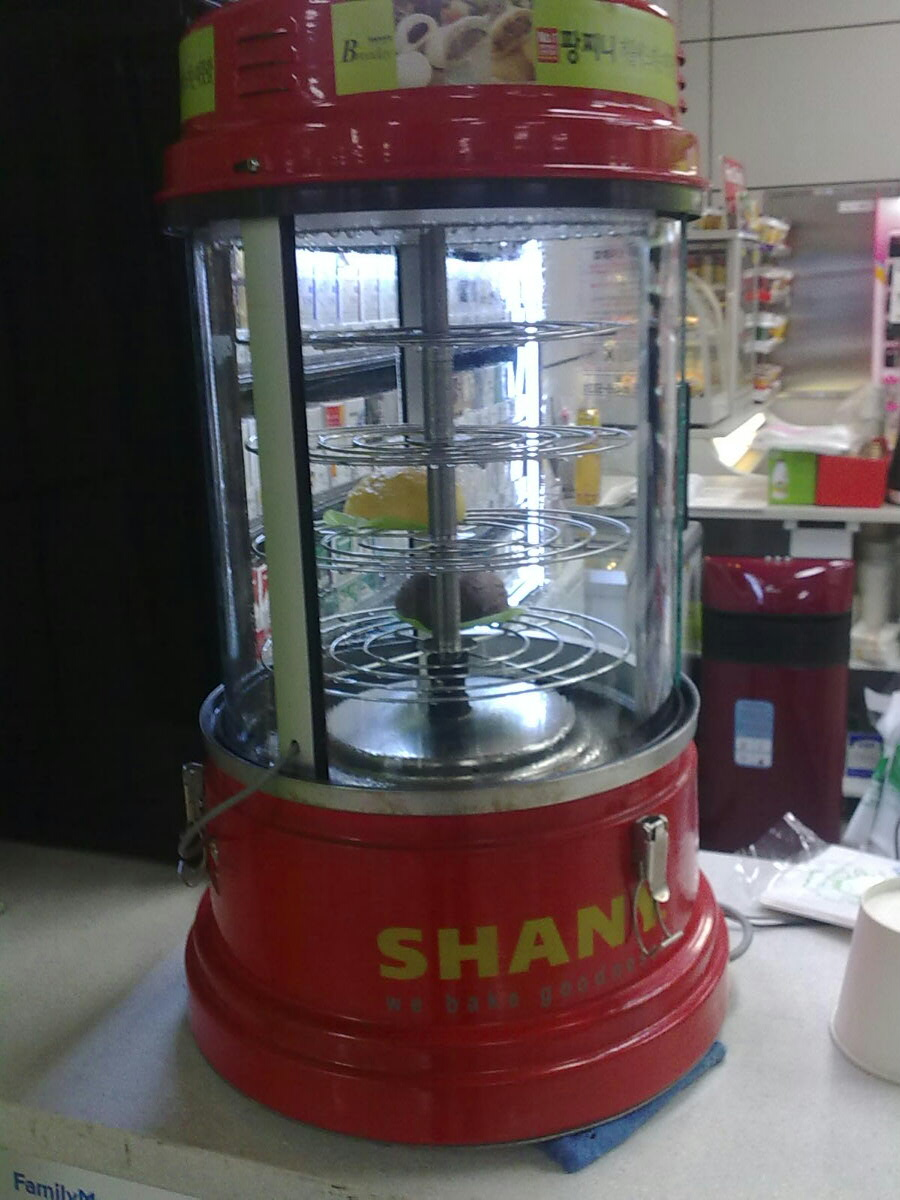
Hoppang machine

== See also ==
- Bungeo-ppang
- Hotteok
- List of buns
- List of Korean desserts
- List of steamed foods
- List of stuffed dishes
