= Bánh bao =

Chinese steamed bun

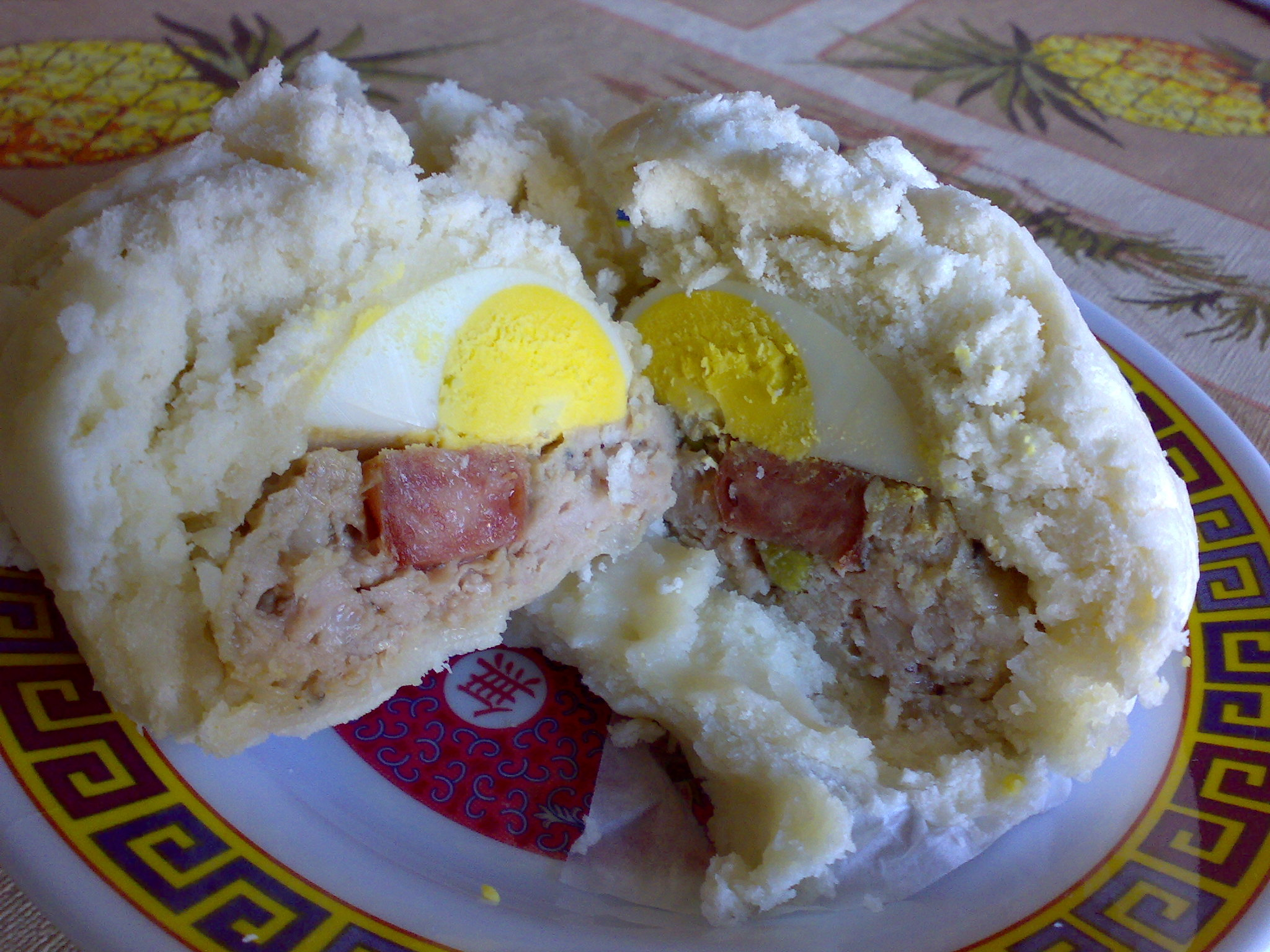
- A banh bao cut in half, displaying its contents.
- Place of origin: China
- Region or state: East Asia
- Main ingredients: Ground pork or chicken, Chinese sausage, portion of a hard-boiled egg, onions, mushrooms

- Bánh bao
- Vietnamese alphabet: Bánh bao
- Hán-Nôm: 餅包

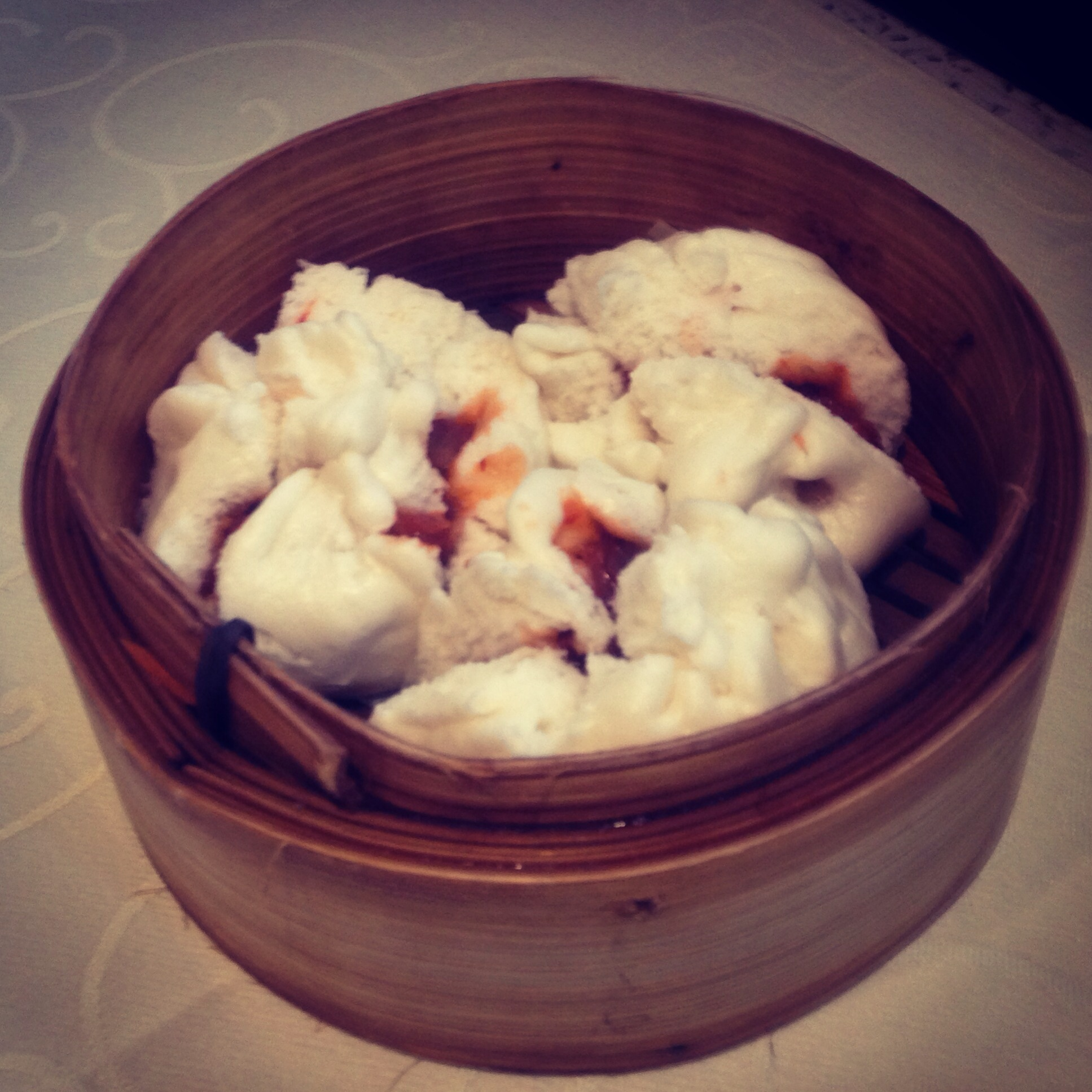
Bánh bao xá xíu

Bánh bao (literally "dumplings") is a Chinese bun based on the Cantonese tai pao, or da bao (large bun), which was introduced to Vietnam by Chinese immigrants. It is a ball-shaped bun containing pork or chicken meat, onions, eggs, mushrooms and vegetables. It often has Chinese sausage and a portion of a hard-boiled egg inside. They are filled with savory fillings, the most common being seasoned ground pork and quail egg. A vegetarian version also exists, containing a mix of mushrooms, tofu, glass noodles, and vegetables like carrots or jicama. Banh bao is a popular street food and is typically eaten as breakfast or a snack.

== See also ==
- Baozi
- List of buns
- List of steamed foods
- List of stuffed dishes
