= List of Chinese desserts =

Chinese desserts are sweet foods and dishes that are served with tea, along with meals, or at the end of meals in Chinese cuisine. The desserts encompass a wide variety of ingredients commonly used in East Asian cuisines such as powdered or whole glutinous rice, sweet bean pastes, and agar. Due to the many Chinese cultures and the long history of China, there are a great variety of desserts of many forms.

== Chinese desserts ==
=== A ===
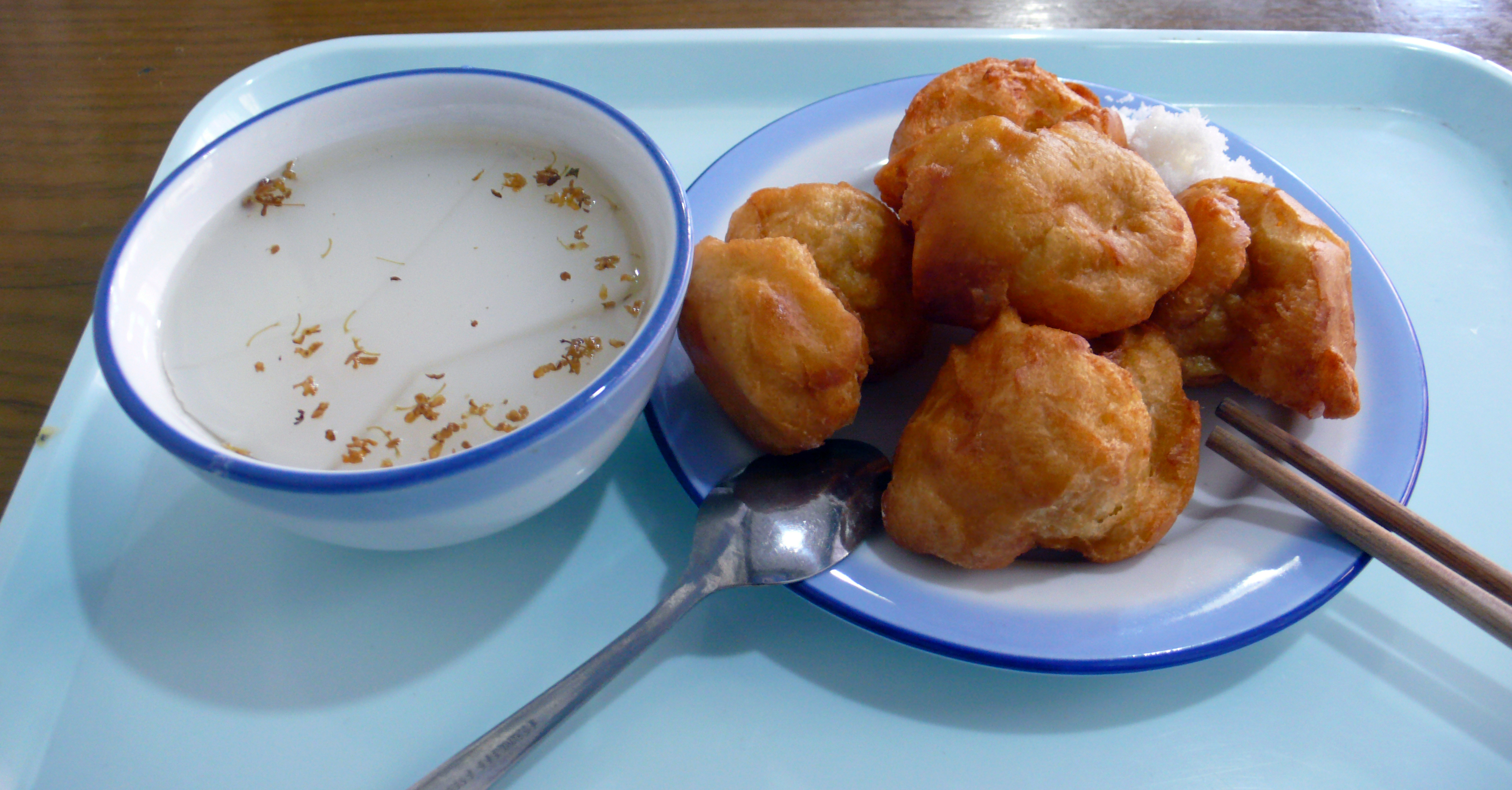
Peking-style xingren doufu (left) with sprinkled dried osmanthus flower in a restaurant in Beijing, China. Peking-style cream fried dough (奶油炸糕) on the right.

- Xingren doufu 杏仁豆腐 -- a curdled dessert often translated as "almond tofu", despite actually being made from apricot kernel milk.
- Aiwowo 艾窝窝 -- small, round glutinous rice dumplings filled with sugar and various nuts.

=== B ===
- Banana roll 香蕉糕 -- nugget-sized glutinous rice cakes with the fragrance of banana oil
- Black sesame roll 芝麻卷
- Black sesame soup 黑芝麻糊 -- sweet, creamy soup made from powdered black sesame, usually served hot
- Bingfen 冰粉 -- clear jellies made from the seeds of Nicandra physalodes, usually served cold with brown sugar syrup and other toppings

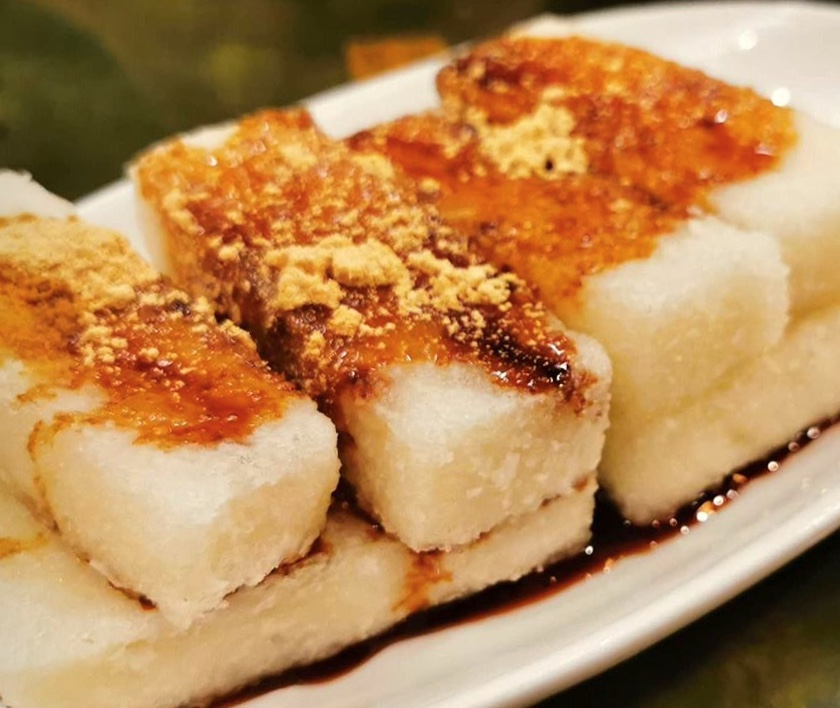
Sichuanese deep-fried ciba served with brown sugar syrup and roasted soybean flour.

=== C ===
- Chao hong guo 炒红果 -- whole hawthorn fruits braised in sugar.
- Ching bo leung 清补凉 -- cold, coconut-based tongsui with various toppings, common in (sub-)tropical provinces (e.g. Hainan, Guangxi)
- Chongyang cake 重阳糕 -- rice cakes consumed on Chongyang Day, an autumn holiday with traditions of paying respects to elders and ancestors
- Ciba 糍粑 -- rice cakes made by mashing steamed glutinous rice common in southwestern China, with many variations
- Coconut bar 椰汁糕 -- cold curds of coconut milk
- Crystal cake 水晶饼 -- baked, flaky pastries with fillings primarily made from sugar and lard

=== D ===
- Douhua 豆花 -- sweet bean curd
- Dragon's beard candy 龙须糖
- Double skin milk 双皮奶 -- steamed milk pudding.

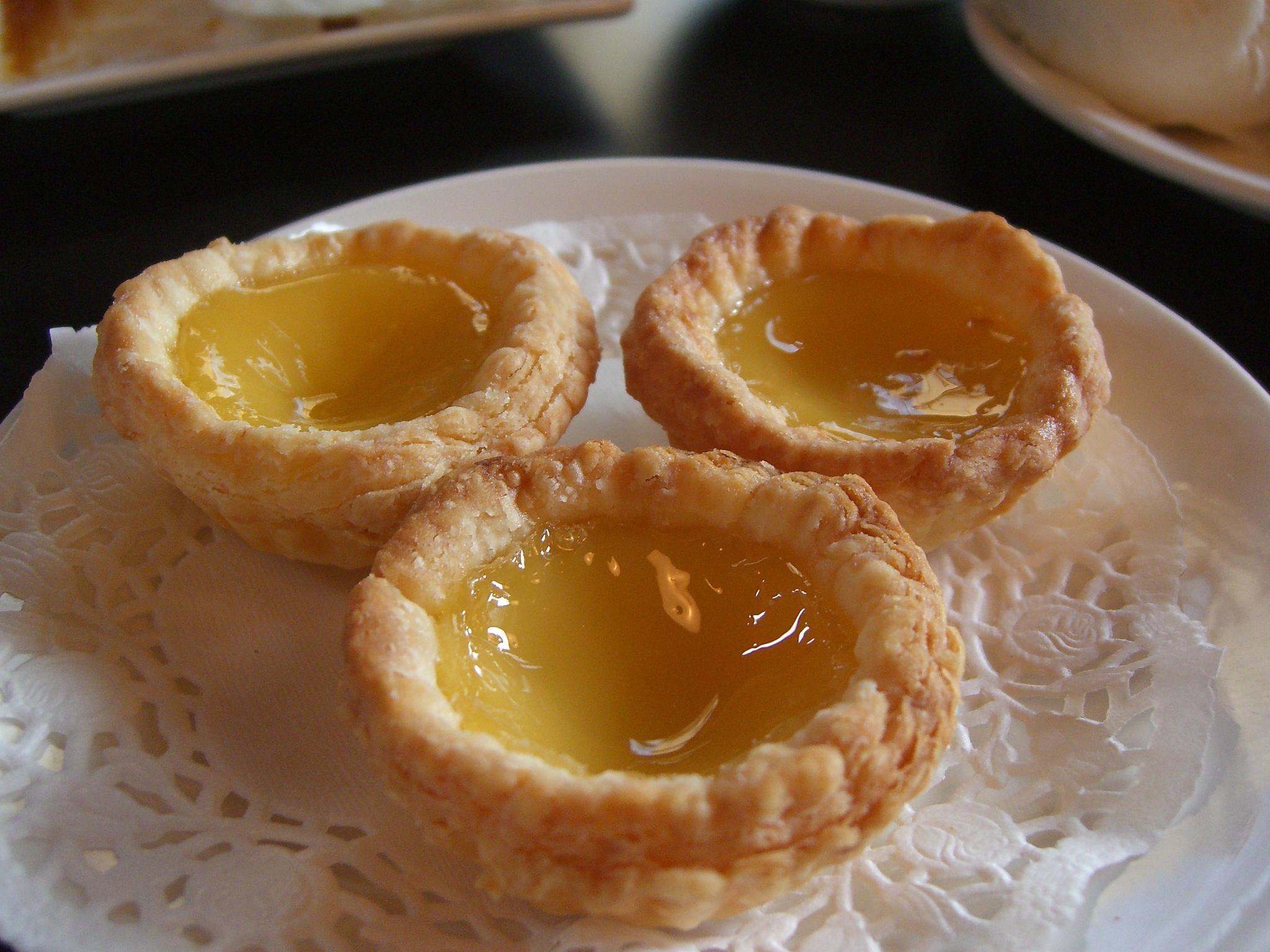
Canton-style egg custard tart served in a dim sum restaurant.

=== E ===
- Ear-hole fried cake 耳朵眼炸糕 -- fried millet rice cakes with red bean paste fillings; named after the shallow alley (hutong) it originated in.
- Egg custard tart 蛋挞--is a popular pastry consisting of an outer pastry crust filled with egg custard and baked
- Egg tong sui 蛋花糖水 -- sweet egg drop soup.
- Egg Waffles 鸡蛋仔 -- hand-held hot cakes with egg-shaped surface impressions

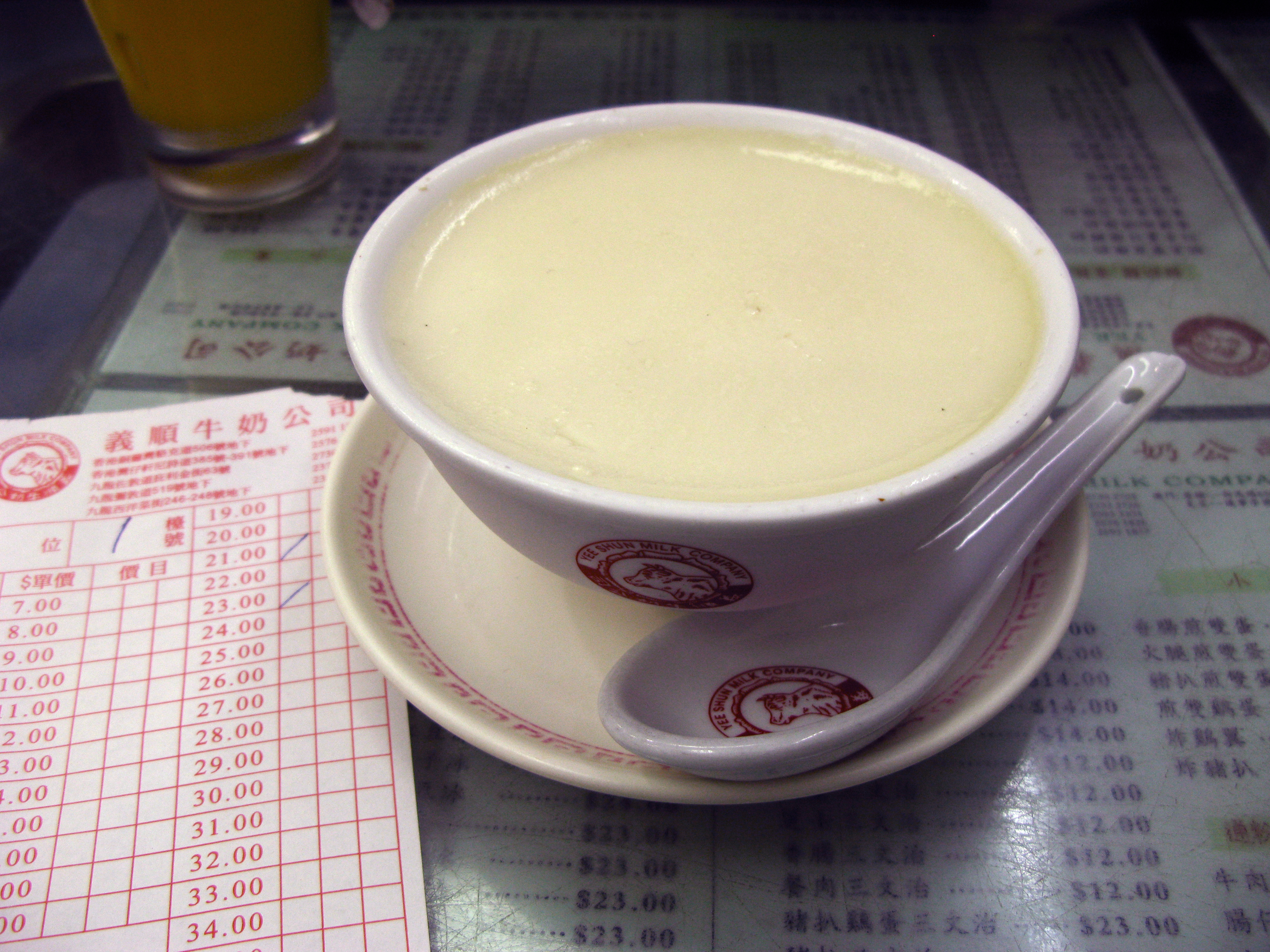
A bowl of ginger milk curd in a Cantonese restaurant in Hong Kong.

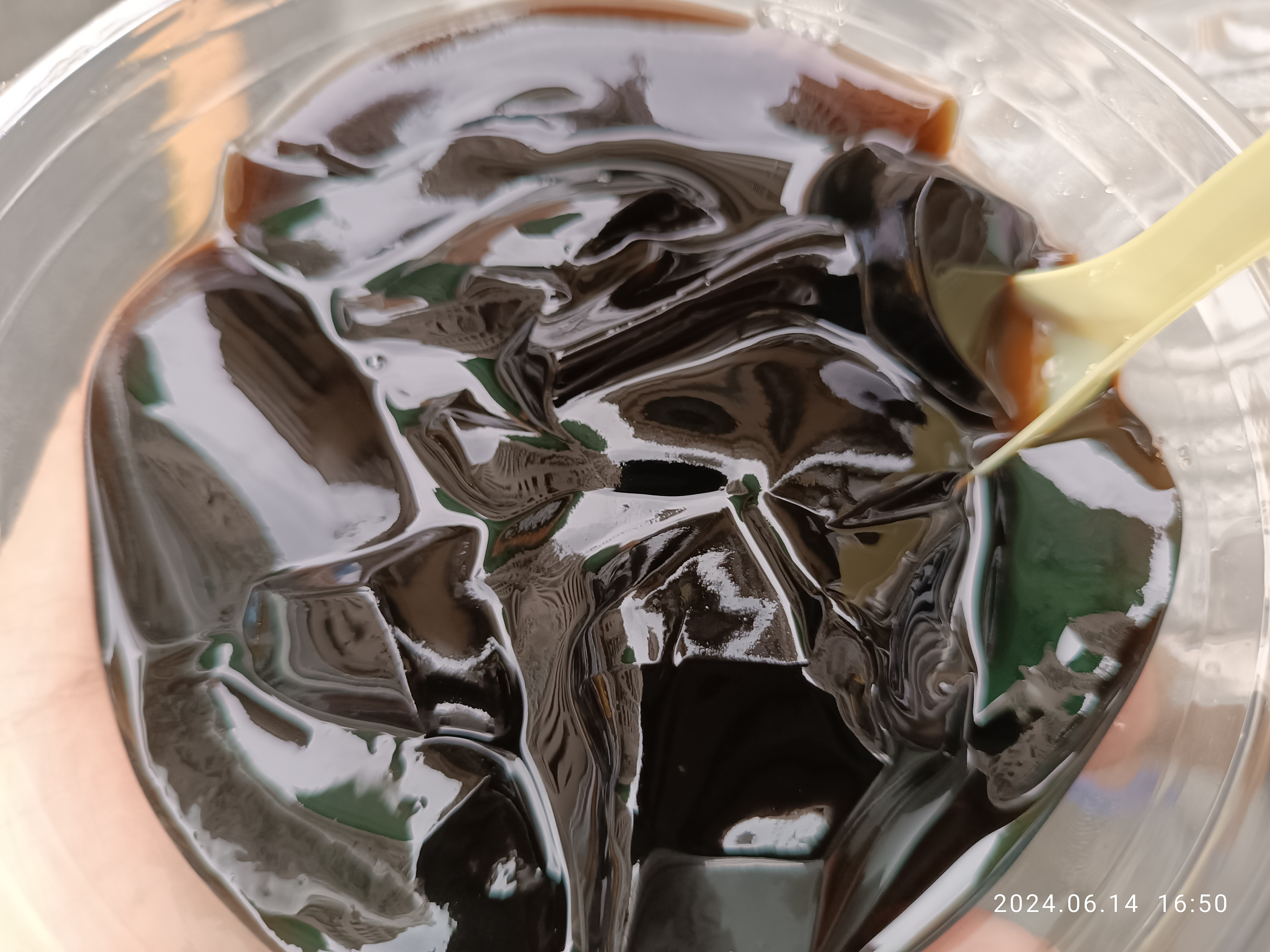
Grass jellies are prepared by boiling Chinese menosa, an herb in the mint family.

=== F ===
- Fried ice cream 炸冰淇淋 -- quickly deep-fried breaded scoops of ice cream with warm, crispy shells around the still-cold ice cream
- Fried milk 炸鲜奶--fried milk is a dessert made by coating solidified fresh milk paste with batter or breadcrumbs and then deep-frying it.

=== G ===
- Ginger milk curd 姜撞奶 - a Cantonese steamed dessert; ginger juice is used to curdle the sweetened milk
- Grass jelly 仙草
- Guilinggao 龟苓膏 -- herbal jellies that traditionally contains turtle shell, served either hot or cold

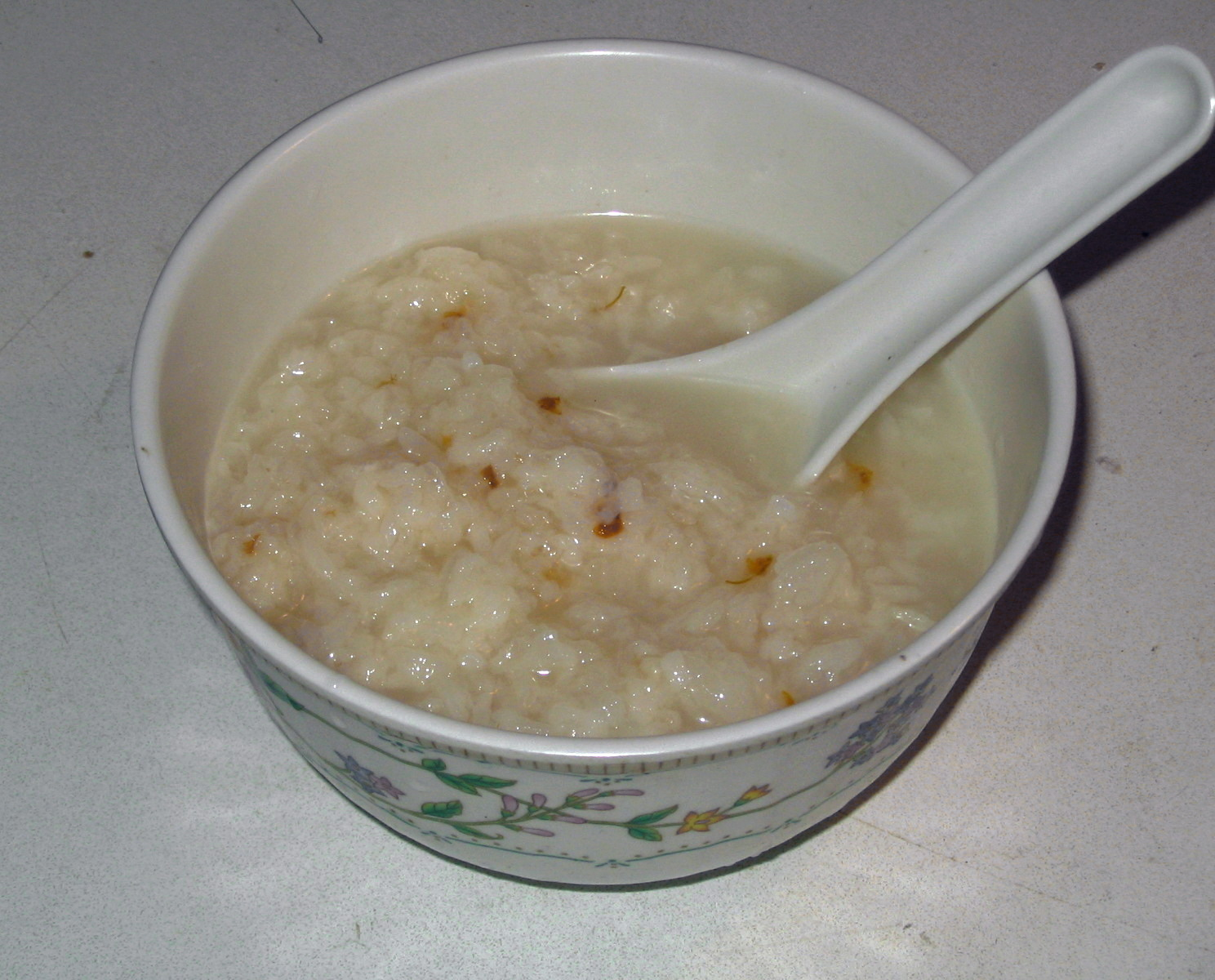
A bowl of jiuniang with osmanthus flowers sprinkled on top.

=== H ===
- Hasma 雪蛤
- Hup toh soh 核桃酥 -- chinese walnut cookies

=== J ===
- Jiuniang 酒酿 -- fermented sweet rice that is slightly alcoholic; can be eaten on its own or used as a ingredient of other desserts (e.g. egg tong sui, soup of tangyuan)
- JingBaJian 京八件 -- a series of eight Chinese desserts originated in the imperial kitchen of the Qing dynasty
- Jian dui / sesame balls 煎堆 -- fried glutinous rice balls with sweet fillings, covered with sesame seed

=== K ===
- Kai kou xiao 开口笑 -- crunchy deep-fried dough nuggets

=== L ===
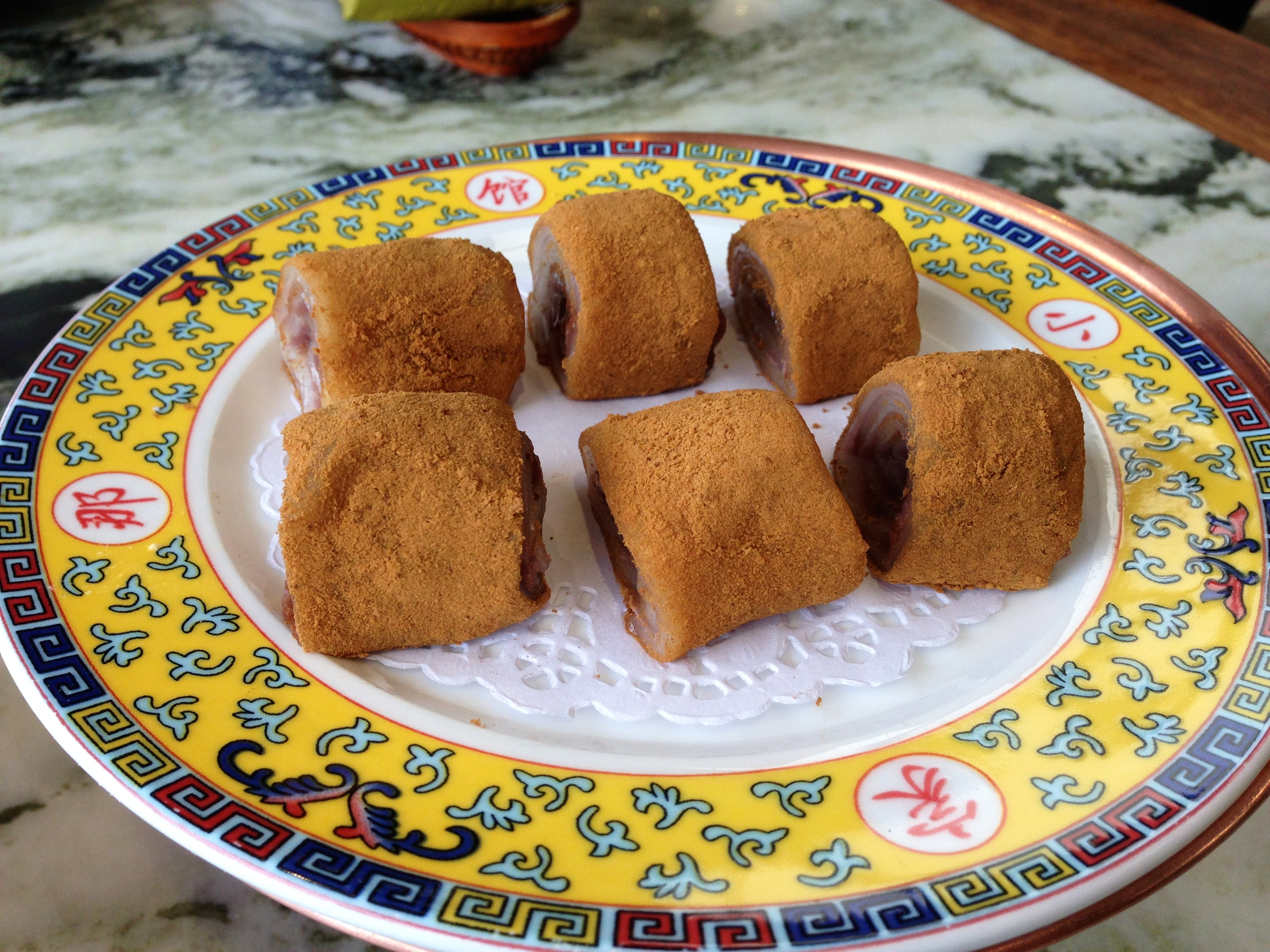
Lüdagun served on a plate in a restaurant in Beijing

- Liang gao 凉糕 -- glutinous rice cakes served cold, sometimes with various sweet toppings
- Liang xia 凉虾 -- tiny rice jellies in sweet soup, visually resembling tiny shrimps, common as a street food in southwestern China
- Ligao Tang 梨膏糖--a hard candy made primarily from pear juice or pear syrup, combined with sugar and various Chinese herbs. It has the medicinal effect of moisturizing the lungs and relieving cough.
- Lotus seed bun 莲蓉包 -- a steamed bao filled with sweet lotus seed paste
- Lüdagun 驴打滚 -- a traditional Manchu treat, essentially glutinous rice rolls with red bean paste fillings, covered in roasted soybean flour； name literally translates to "rolling donkey".
- Lüdou gao 绿豆糕-- a traditional Chinese chilled dessert made from ground mung beans, often consumed during the Dragon Boat Festival.

==== M ====
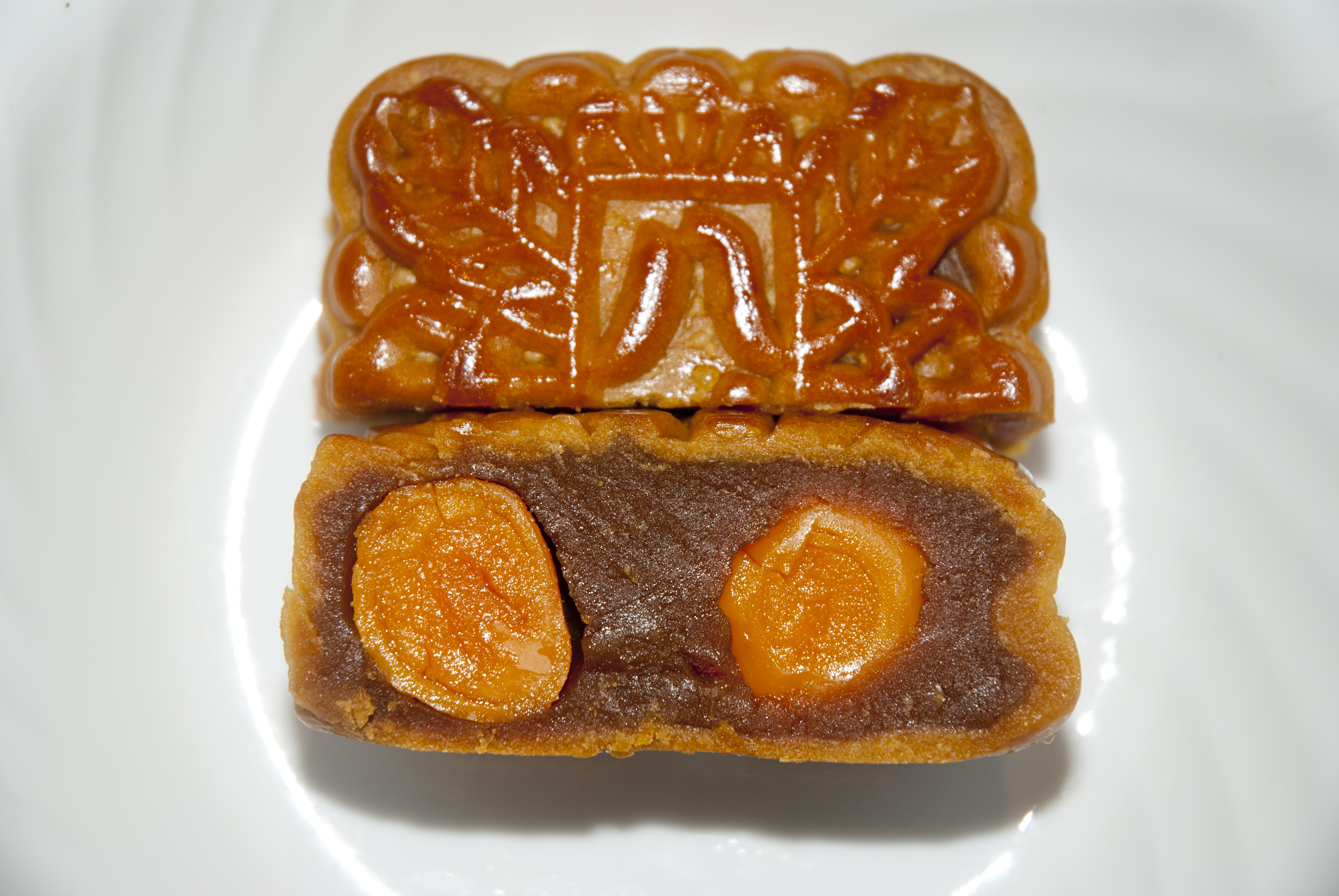
A traditional Cantonese mooncake with lotus seed paste and salted egg yolk fillings

- Mahua 麻花 -- braided fried dough
- Mango pomelo sago 杨枝甘露 -- a mango-puree-based tongsui with sago, pomelo pulp, and coconut milk
- Mango pudding 芒果布丁--a dessert made primarily from mango pulp, milk, sugar, and a coagulant.
- Malay sponge cake 马拉糕--a soft pastry made from flour, eggs, lard or butter, fermented and then steamed, originating in Guangdong and a common dim sum in Cantonese teahouses.
- Mi san dao 蜜三刀 -- syrup-infused fried dough, characterized by the three cuts on each nugget
- Mooncake 月饼 -- a class of pastries with various fillings consumed on Mid-Autumn Festival.

=== N ===
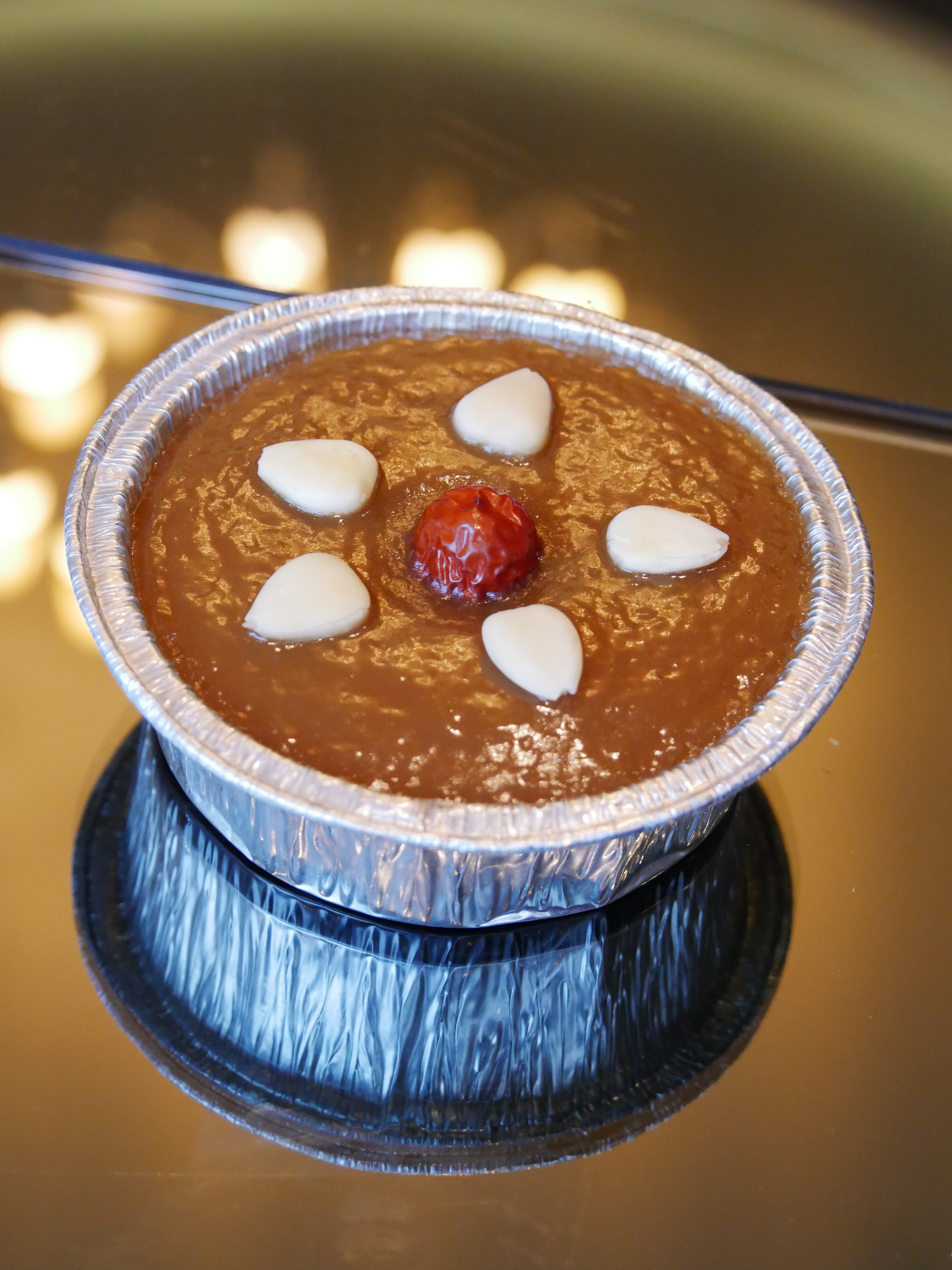
Steamed Cantonese brown sugar nian gao, traditionally consumed during Chinese New Year.

- suan nai 酸奶 -- yogurt-like milk curd with soft tofu-like texture, traditionally fermented with glutinous rice wine.
- Nai wong bao 奶黄包 -- Cantonese steamed custard buns.
- Nian dou bao 粘豆包 -- north-eastern style steamed dumplings with glutinous skin and very subtly sweet red bean paste fillings, commonly dipped in granulated sugar before eaten
- Nian gao 年糕 -- a class of glutinous rice cakes.
- Nuomici 糯米糍 -- glutinous rice flour dumplings with sweet fillings, similar to daifuku in Japan but commonly covered with coconut flakes.

=== O ===
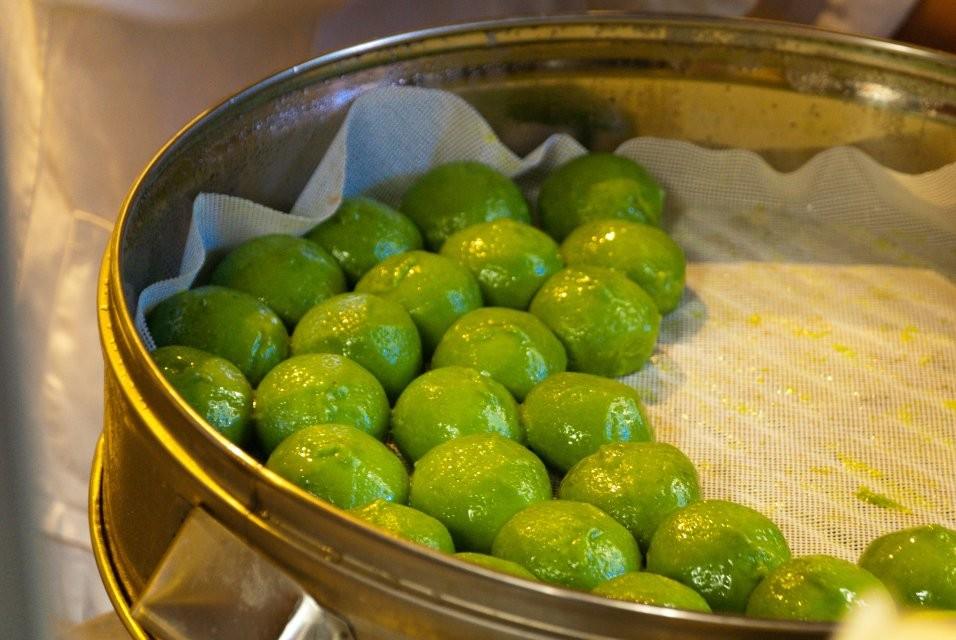
Qingtuan steamed in batch.

- Osmanthus cake 桂花糕 -- glutinous rice cakes with osmanthus-infused syrup.

=== P ===
- Put chai ko 钵仔糕 -- steamed rice cakes in small bowls
- Pineapple bun 菠萝包 -- a no-filling bun characterized by a crispy, cookie-like top, visually resembling pineapple
- Pineapple cake 凤梨酥--a traditional Taiwanese sweet pastry containing a rich, jammy pineapple filling encased in a crumbly, buttery crust.

=== Q ===
- Qingtuan 青团 -- a class of steamed glutinous rice flour dumpling, traditionally consumed around Qingming Festival each spring in south-eastern China. The skin is rendered green by the juice of spring-season herbs (traditionally Chinese mugwort).

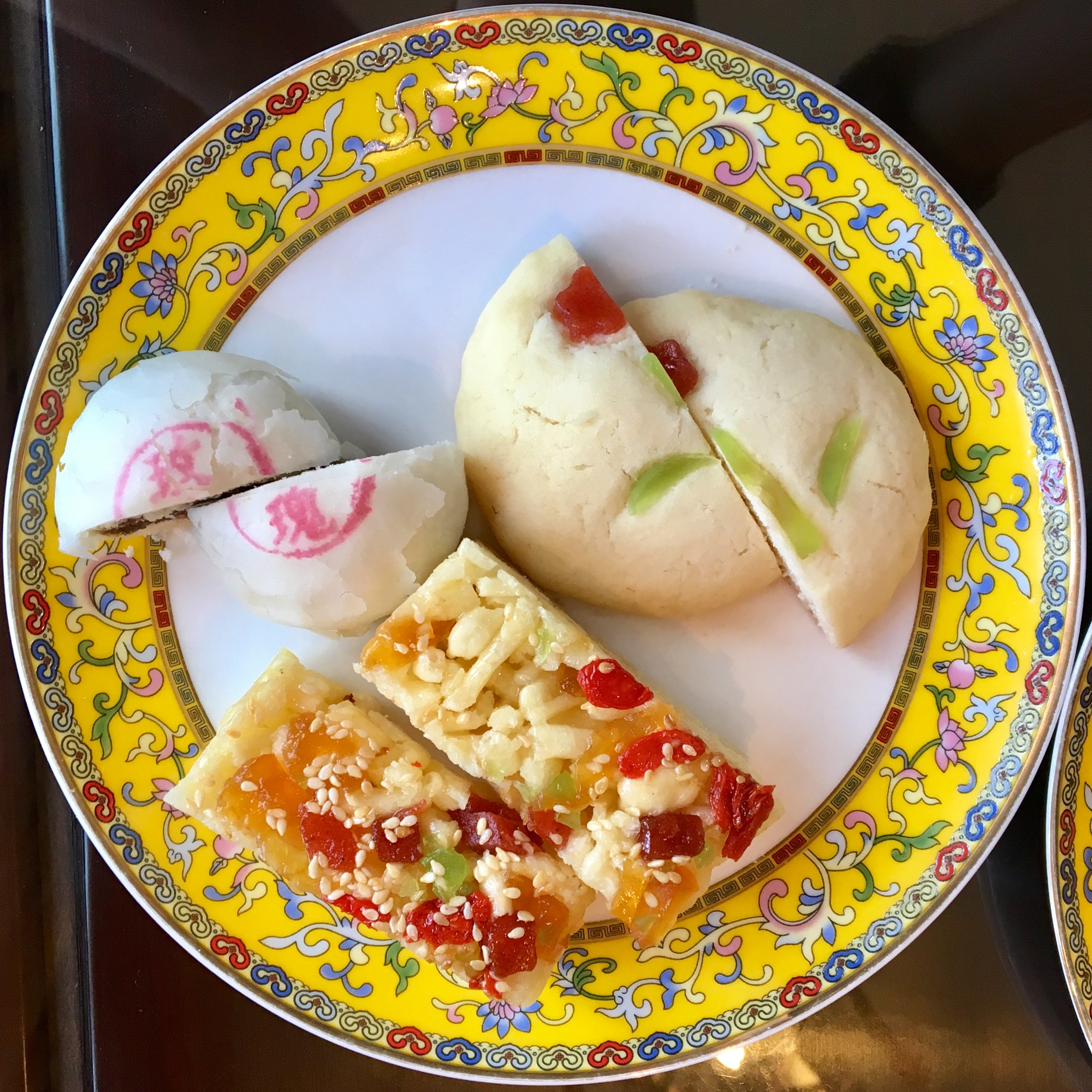
Traditional Manchu sachima (below, two pieces) and rose cake (Xianhua bing) (upper left, split).

=== R ===
- Red bean cake 红豆糕--a traditional Chinese pastry made primarily from red beans, it has a soft and chewy texture and a sweet and fragrant taste.
- Red bean soup 紅豆湯--a traditional sweet soup made primarily from red beans.
- Red tortoise cake 紅龜粿 -- red-colored glutinous rice cakes, shaped in moulds with tortoise shell carvings
- Ba bao fan 八宝饭 -- glutinous rice steamed with eight kinds of toppings, including various candied fruits and legumes ("eight treasures")
- Red bean bun 豆沙包--a type of steamed bun made by wrapping red bean paste filling in fermented dough and steaming.

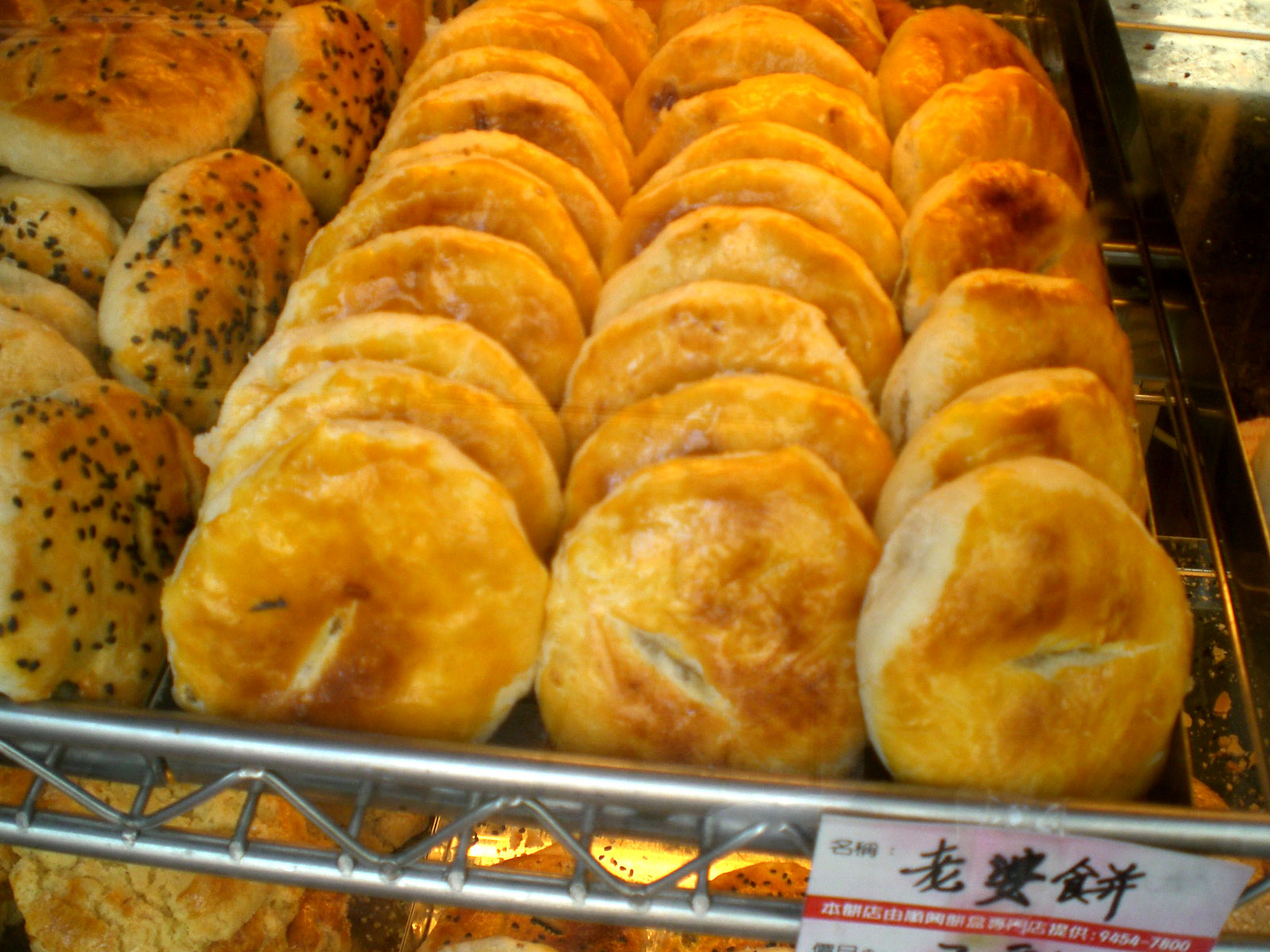
Sweetheart cake / "wife cake" sold in a Cantonese bakery in Hong Kong.

=== S ===
- Sachima 萨其马/沙琪玛 -- Manchurian dough fritter heavily infused with syrup.
- Sago pudding 西米布甸
- Sai mai lou 西米捞 -- a cold tongsui with sago as the main ingredient, typically with a coconut-milk-based sweet soup and various sweet toppings.
- Shanzhagao 山楂糕 -- tangy cubes of curd made from hawthorns puree.
- Shuijing bao 水晶包 -- steamed buns with sweet fillings and clear-colored wheat starch wrappings
- Song gao (Shanghai style) 松糕 -- spongy rice flour cakes, typically with red beans
- Sugar painting 糖画--folk handicraft food made by drawing various patterns on a flat surface using melted sugar syrup as raw material.
- Sweet potato soup 番薯糖水 -- a tongsui with sweet potatoes as the main ingredient
- Sweetheart cake 老婆饼 -- a Cantonese pastry with flaky skin, commonly filled with winter melon paste mixed with glutinous rice flour and sugar; variations of filling also common

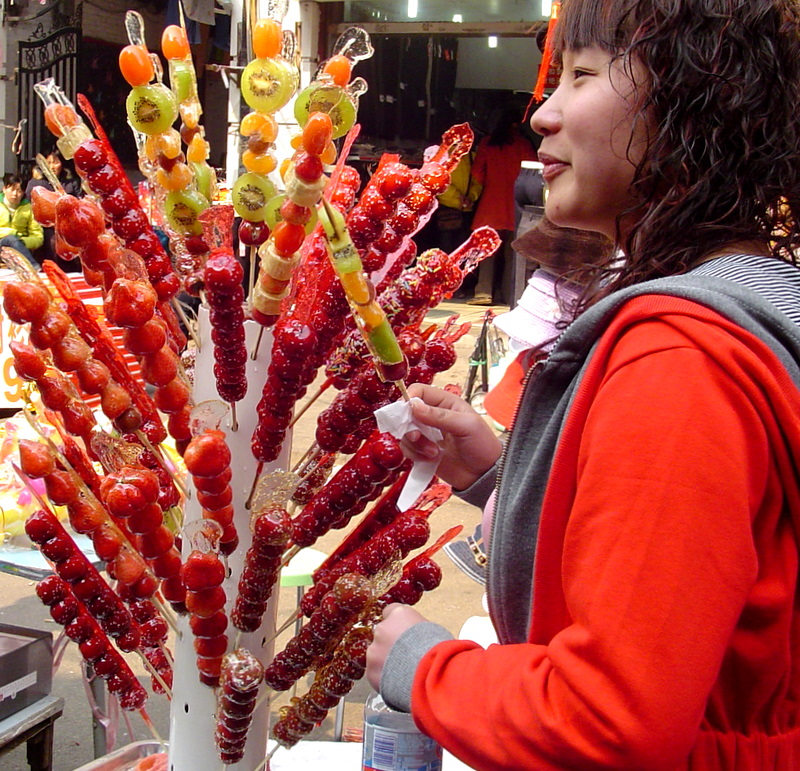
A large batch of tanghulu made with various fruits sold along the street in Shanghai.

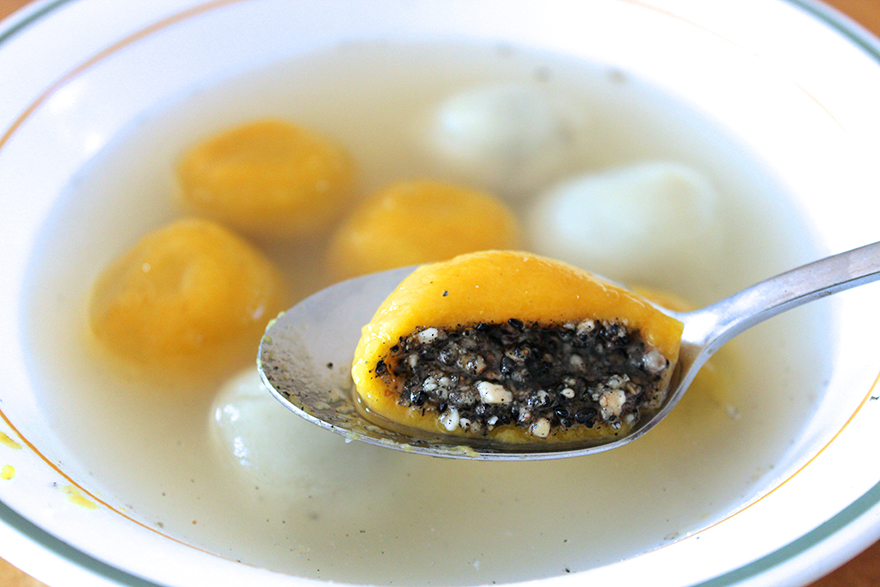
A bowl of tangyuan with black sesame filling. Yellow ones have skins made with pumpkin.

=== T ===
- Tanghulu 糖葫芦 -- a skewer of fresh fruits (traditionally hawthorns) coated with melted sugar and chilled, originated in northern China
- Tang ou 糖藕 -- steamed lotus roots filled with glutinous rice, chilled and served in osmanthus syrup
- Tang sanjiao 糖三角 -- steamed triangular buns (bao) with hot, melted brown sugar fillings
- Tangyuan 汤圆 -- soup-based boiled glutinous rice balls; common sweet fillings include black sesame and red bean paste
- Taro purée 芋泥
- Taro pastry 芋头酥--a type of baked pastry with taro paste filling and a flaky pastry outer layer.
- Taro cake 芋头糕-- a savory pastry made primarily from taro, combined with glutinous rice flour, preserved meat, and other ingredients, and then steamed.
- Tiaotou gao 条头糕 -- Shanghainese glutinous rice cake rolls with red bean paste fillings.
- Tong bat lat 糖不甩 -- Cantonese glutinous rice balls with crushed peanuts, sesame, and brown sugar
- Tong sui 糖水 -- a class of soup/liquid-based desserts that are served either cold or hot

=== W ===
- Wan dou huang 豌豆黄 -- cubes of starchy, subtly sweet curd made from dried yellow peas
- Water chestnut cake 马蹄糕 -- a sweet, flat-cube-shaped dim sum primarily made from flour and chunks of Chinese water chestnut.
- White sugar sponge cake 白糖糕 -- a Cantonese spongy, subtly sweet rice cake

=== X ===
- Xi gua lao 西瓜酪 -- thickened watermelon juice
- Xianhua bing 鲜花饼 -- baked flaky pastries with candied rose petal fillings
- Xingren cha 杏仁茶 -- a thickened starchy sweet soup with almond-like fragrance and various sweet toppings (Peking style) or a sweet beverage made from apricot kernel milk (Cantonese style)
- Xuemian dousha 雪绵豆沙 -- red bean paste wrapped in whipped egg whites and deep-fried

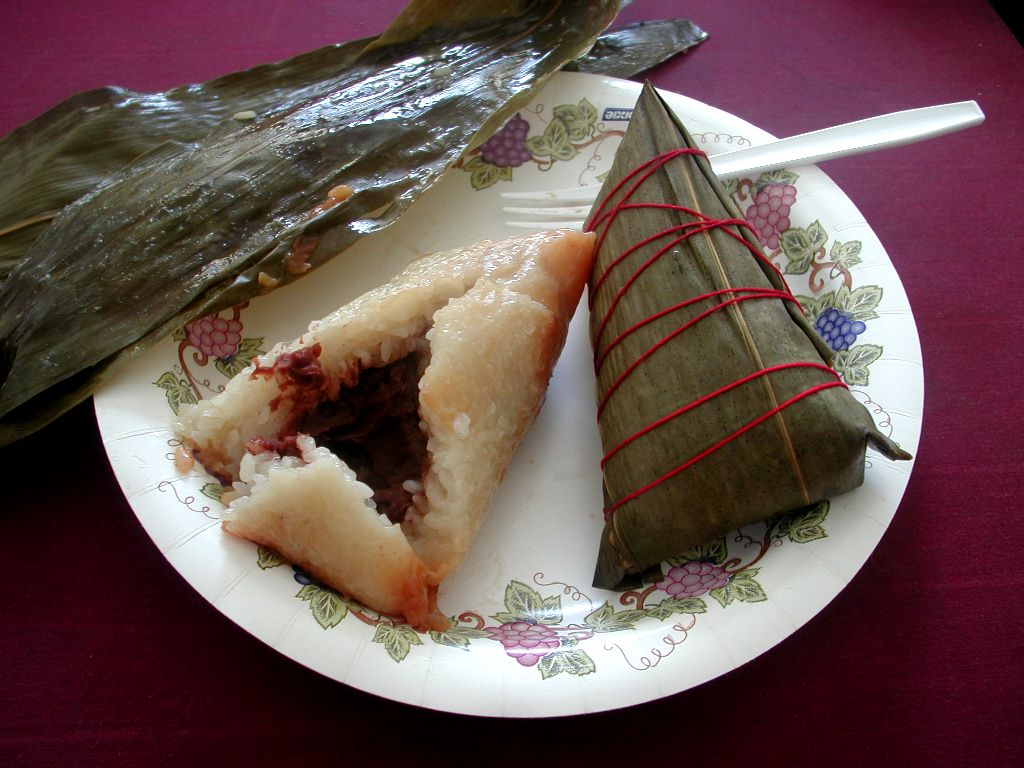
Wrapped (right) and unwrapped (left) zongzi with sweet red bean paste filling; wrappings are large-leaved bamboo leaves.

=== Y ===
- Yenx seinp 乳扇 -- a Bai treat with variants being a dessert; dairy sheets made by drying milk

=== Z ===
- Zhu er ba 猪儿粑 -- Sichuanese steamed rice dumplings with fillings, wrapped in leaves of banana, shell ginger, or palm grass.
- Zigong yanwosi 自贡燕窝丝 - "Zigong bird's nest cake" - a steamed bun made of shredded dough, from Zigong (Sichuan). Similar to the huajuan. Created in Zigong in 1965.
- Zongzi 粽子 -- a class of steamed glutinous rice treat wrapped in leaves (commonly of large-leaved bamboo), usually in a conical shape and traditionally consumed on Dragon Boat Festival

== See also ==
- Chinese bakery products
- Cuisine
- List of desserts
- List of Chinese dishes
- List of Chinese sauces
- List of Chinese soups
- List of grass jelly plants
- List of restaurants in China
