= Crystal cake =

Chinese dessert

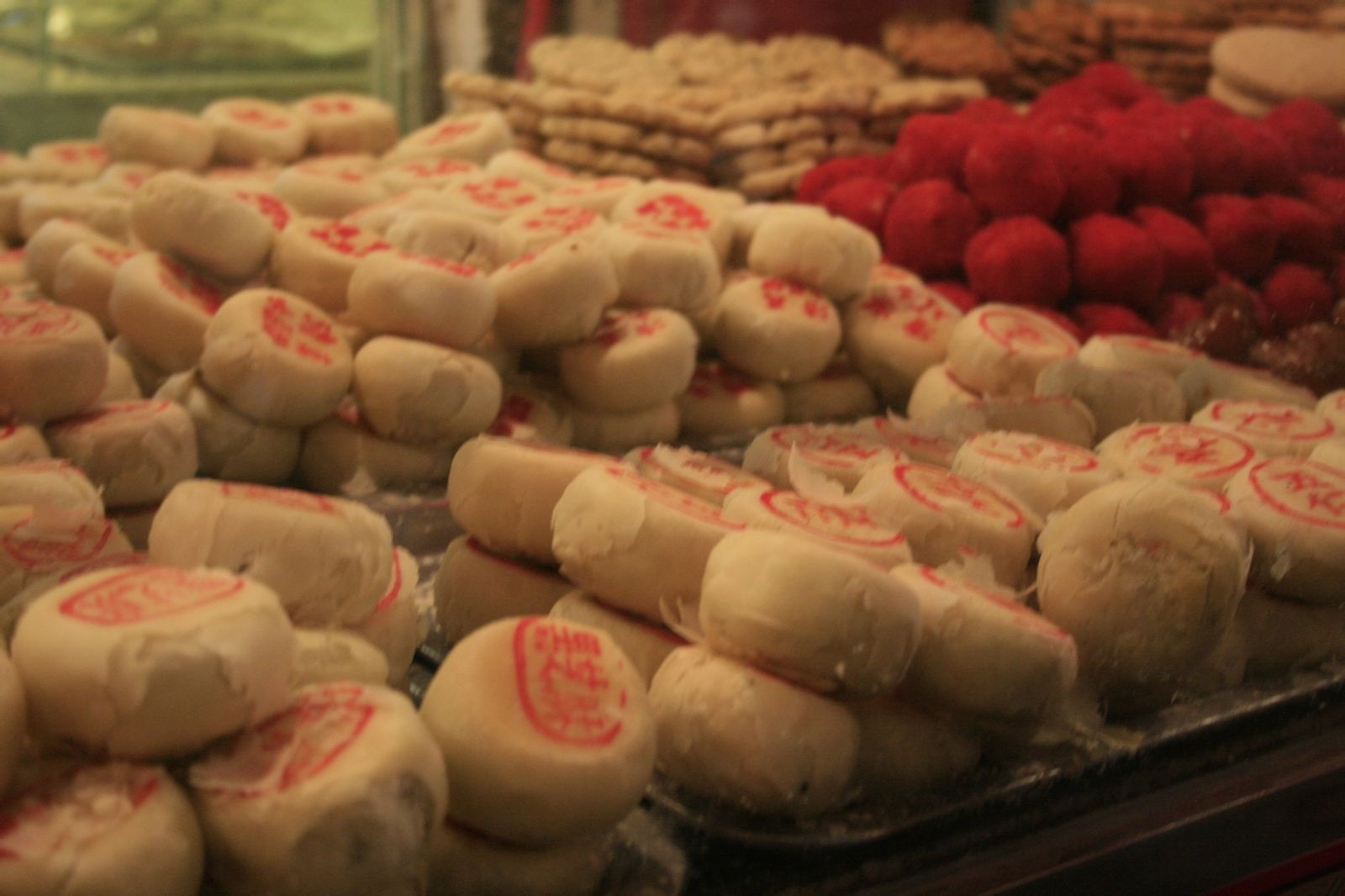
A stand of crystal cakes

Crystal cake (Chinese: 水晶餠; pinyin: Shuǐjīng bǐng) is one of the traditional desserts in Weinan city of eastern Shaanxi, China. It has more than 800 years of history and was first invented in Xiagui during the Song dynasty, eventually spreading throughout the region. It gets its name from its filling, which is glittery and translucent, like a crystal.

The crust is made of wheat flour, starch, and oil; the filling is a mixture of granulated sugar, lard, and pounded rock candy, candied fruits and nuts. In Xi'an, the pastry dough is made with refined wheat flour and rendered pork fat, while the filling is flavored with rose and candied tangerine peel.

In southern China, small pastries with a translucent crust made with wheat starch as a main component, and filled with sweet bean paste, are also called "crystal cake."

== See also ==
- Chinese bakery products
- Chinese desserts
- List of desserts
- Mooncake
- Suncake (disambiguation)
