= Miaohui =

Chinese religious gathering

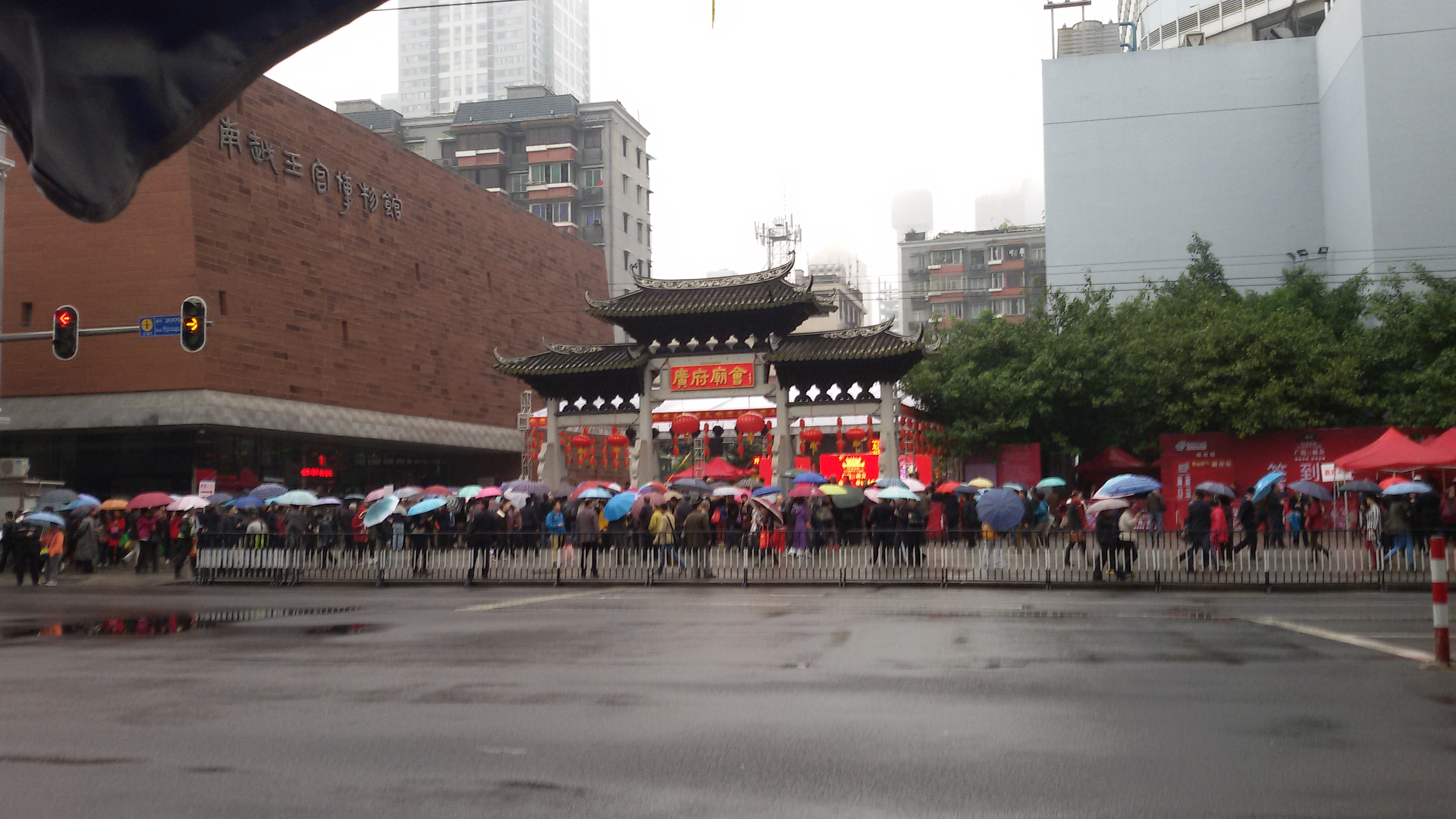
Temple gathering at the Chenghuangshen Temple of Guangzhou, Guangdong.

Miaohui (simplified Chinese: 庙会; traditional Chinese: 廟會; lit. 'temple gatherings'; trans. "temple fairs"), also called yíngshén sàihuì (迎神赛会; 迎神賽會; "collective rituals to greet the gods") (Note: They are also called jié chǎng (节场; "outside festivals"). Other names, used in north China, are: xianghui (香会; "incense gatherings"); saishe (赛社; "communal ritual bodies"); saihui (赛会; "communal ritual gatherings").), are Chinese religious gatherings held by Miao shrines for the worship of the Chinese gods and immortals. Large-scale miaohui are usually held around the time of the Chinese New Year, or in specific temples at the birthday of the god enshrined in the temple itself. Since the development of society with importation of different cultures, the characteristic of miaohui for each dynasty also vary from time to time. For instance, in the Han dynasty, as Buddhism and Taoism has gradually formed, temple fair became a way to attract more newcomers to their community by adding performances. Activities usually include rituals celebrated in the temple, opera on a stage facing the temple, processions of the gods' images on carts throughout villages and cities, performance of musical and ritual troupes (of Taoists, sects and Confucian ritualists), blessing of offerings brought to the temple by families, and various economic activities. Besides, various foods and snacks selling in the miaohui also an attractive part for people, especially for children to join in.

Geography and local customs lead to great differences in the nature of festivals dedicated to the gods. In northern China, miaohui are usually week-long, with ceremonies held in large temples, and attended by tens of thousands of people; while in southern China, they are a much more local practice, organized by village temples or clusters of temples of different villages. In worldwide, not only China has miaohui but also other places such as Malaysia has such temple fair with similar forms and activities.

== Gallery ==
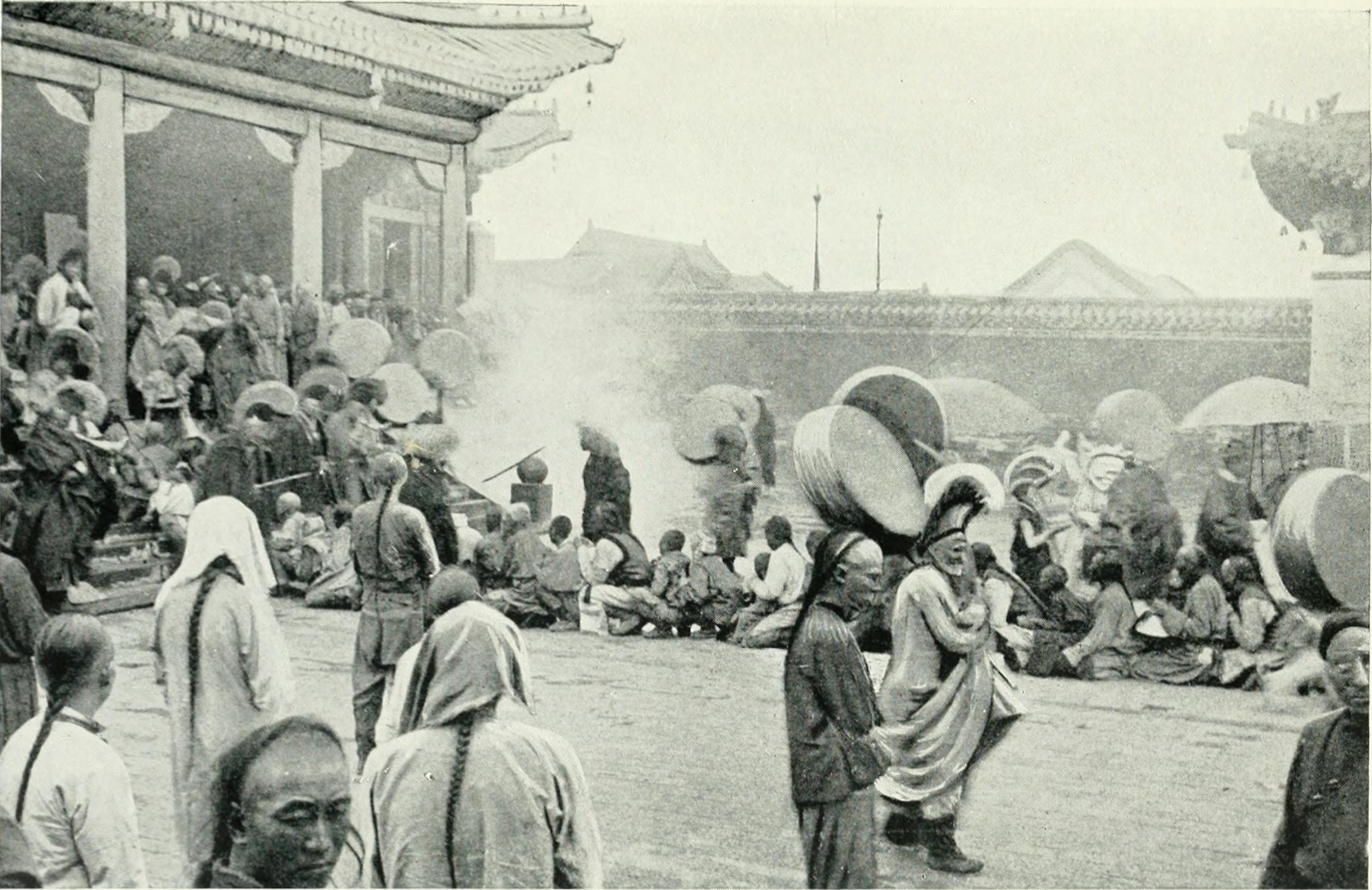
Fair in 1918

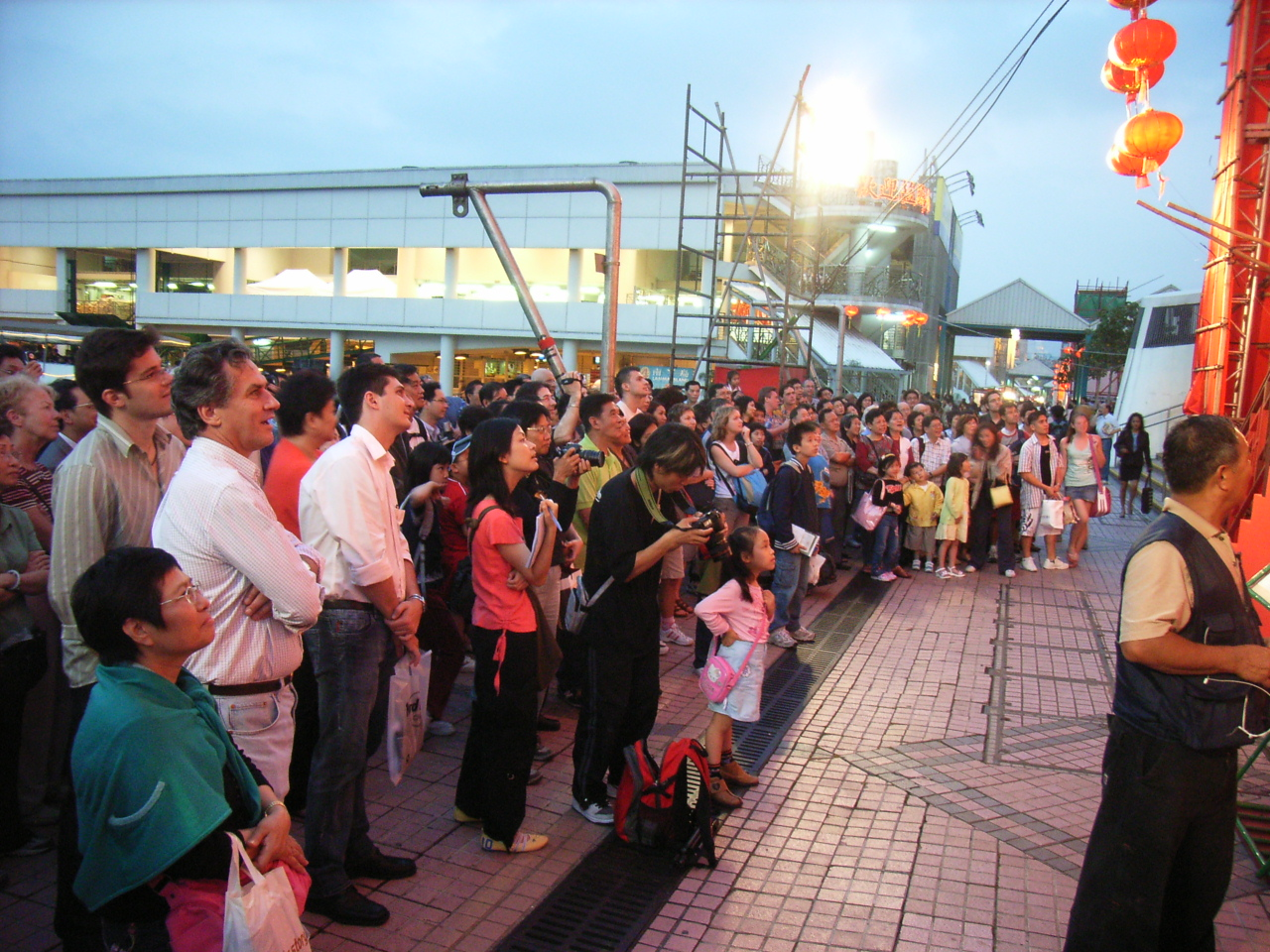
People at a temple fair in Hong Kong

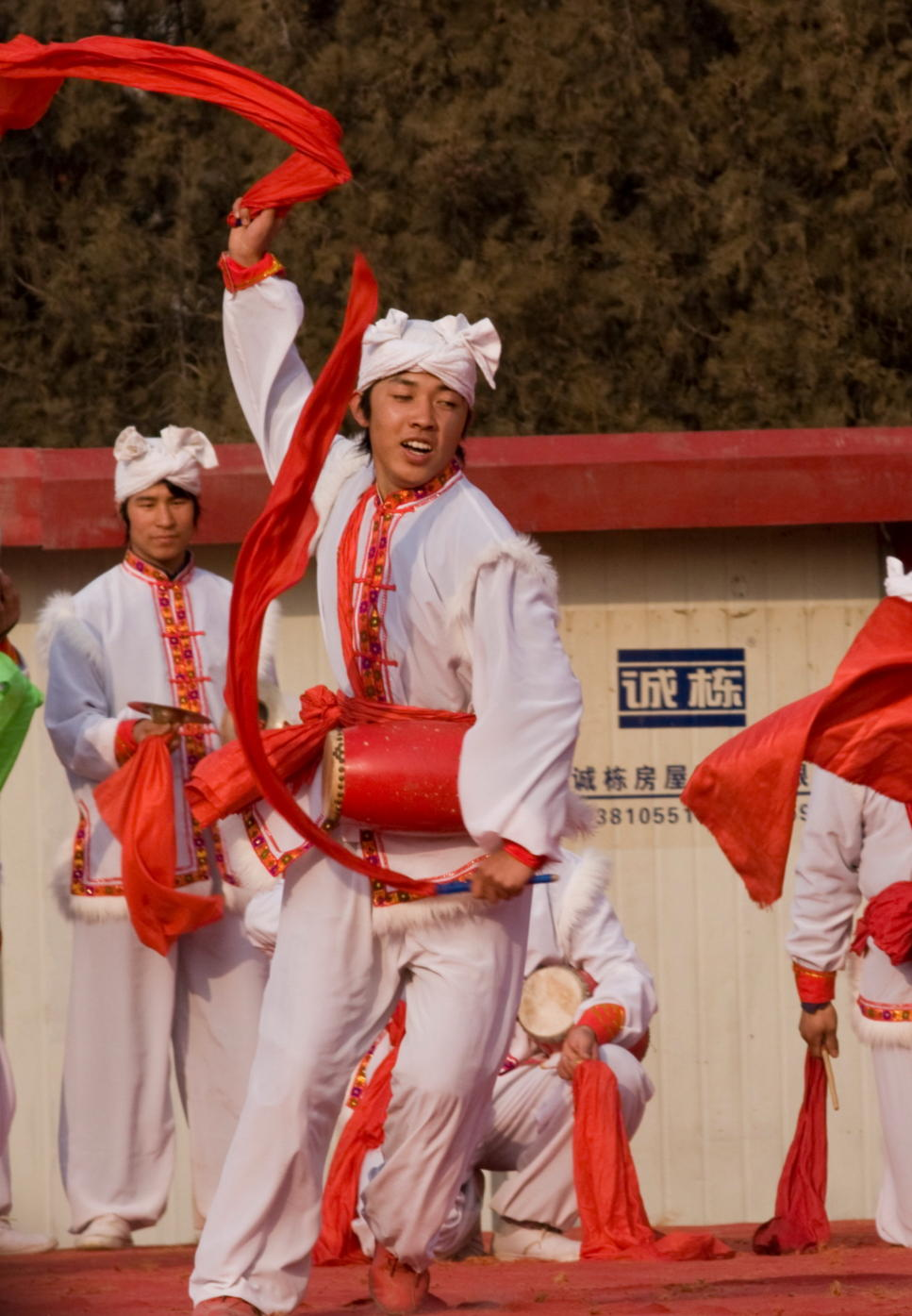
Performers for the temple fair at the Temple of Earth in Beijing

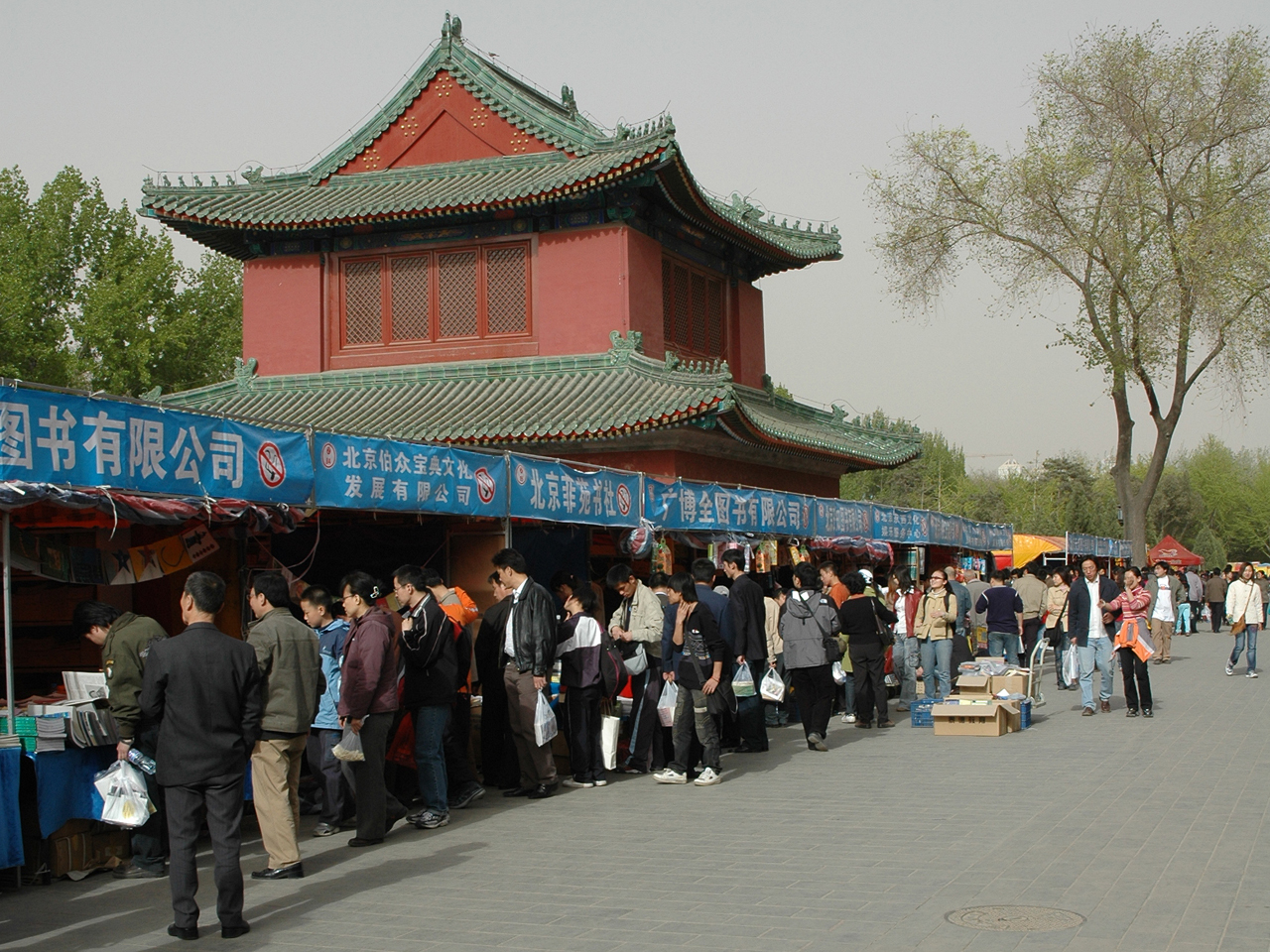
People at a temple fair to buy books

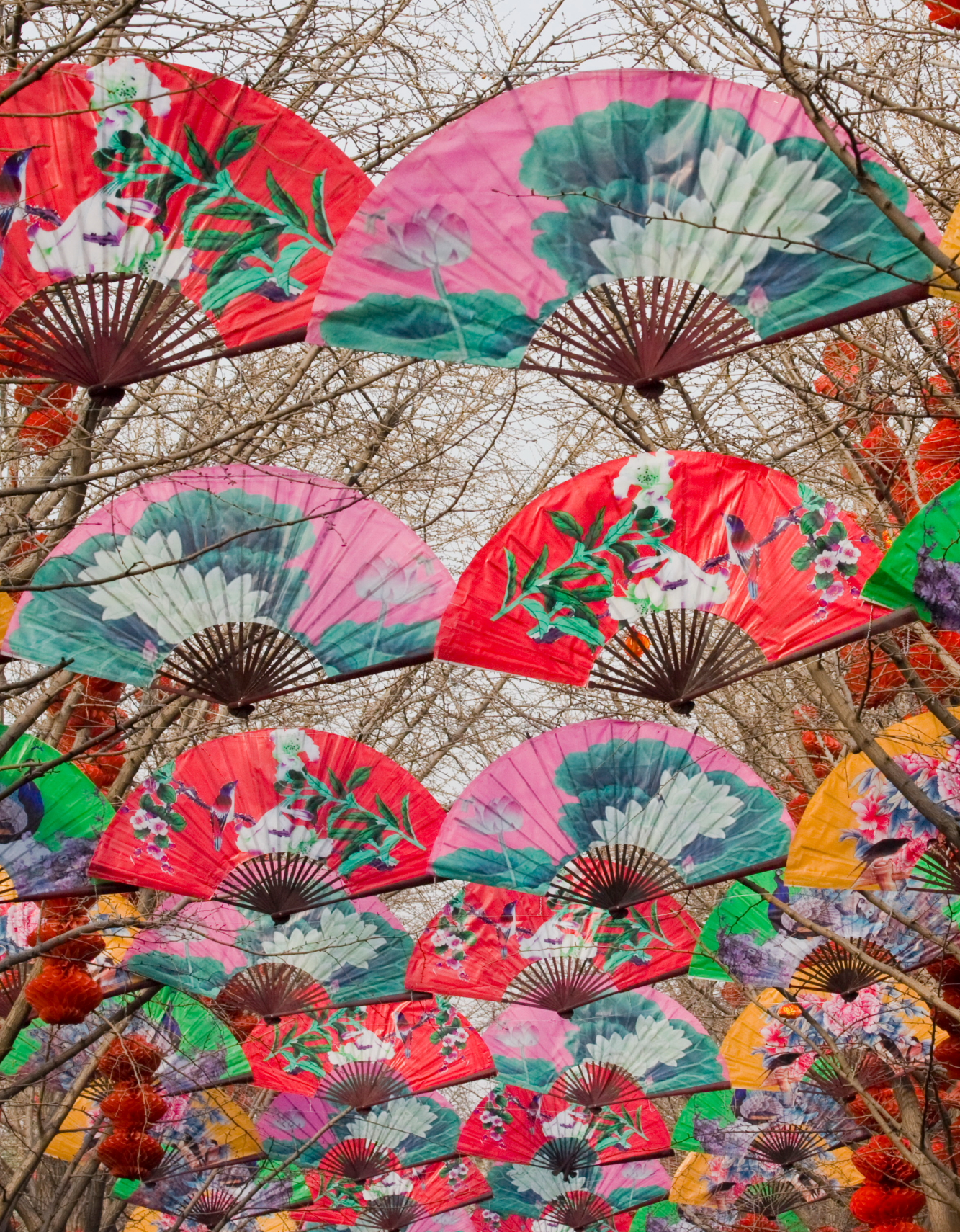
Typical decorations for a temple fair

== Date ==
In the ancient time, the dates of temple fair were various that some would be held on the first day of the lunar new year, some temples hold the temple fair every month at the fixed date. For example, during the end of the Qing dynasty, LongFu temple had a temple fair on the first, second, ninth, and tenth day every month. The ancestor tended to schedule the temple fair as well as the "birth date" of gods during the period that farmers were not busy after harvesting, such as between spring and summer, or at the beginning of the year, or the end of the year. This is because making a celebration at that time is not only for ensuring people have leisure time to pray for gods, but also convenient for farmers and people to do the trades with each other. However, recently, along the society the date is comparatively fixed to Spring festival and Lantern Festival.

== History ==
=== Ancient times ===
Ancestors started to hold the sacrificial rite nearby the temple in order to seek the blessing of gods. The main purpose of forming Miaohui at that time is to bring spiritual sustenance to people and benefit for social stability by exchanging mutual senses between gods and human beings. This is because people would treated god as their resident guardian and the god would protect them well if residents reciprocate by worshipping the god. Meanwhile, people would render the atmosphere by singing and dancing. Thus, at that period, Miaohui was called "Shexi".

=== Han dynasty ===
During the Han dynasty, as while Buddhism has been transported to China, Taoism, a fundamental Chineses religious which emphasizes living in harmony with Dao, also gradually built and formed. Increasing number of people started to value and realize the importance of sacrificial rites and Miaohui. The phenomenon that appeared during the time of two religious co-existing was the competition between Buddhism and Taoism had been raised, which compete for the number of temples each religious had, the more temple they built, the more powerful they were. Thus, the increasing number of temples had been constructed, and meanwhile, more and more temple fairs had been held by each temple. Also, temple fairs would attract the masses to get more believers. Then, in its religious ceremony, the entertainment content of the audience has been added, such as dance, drama, parade, etc. In this way, not only believers would enjoy visiting temple fairs, but also many ordinary people, who were targeted as "candidates" for the religion, were willing to join for fun. Furthermore, in order to attract more people, Buddhism and Taoism even expand their influence by going out of the temple to hold the temple fair.

=== Tang dynasty ===
In the Tang dynasty, it was the openest period of China since different kinds of cultures, especially Hu people's culture, had swarmed into China massively. The purpose of Miaohui had gradually transformed from entirely sacrificing to entertainment. At the same time, Buddhist culture has an unprecedented great influence, and even becomes the most important factor in the ruling class' culture and political life, both in the South and the North. With the prevalence of Buddhism, the worship of Buddhism has become the mainstream of folk beliefs, and Buddhism has infiltrated into the temple fair, making the temple fair culture shows with more religious characteristics. Besides, in the Tang dynasties, with the rapid economic development, the Central Plains was in the leading position in the country and had a great economic and cultural prosperity. Taoist culture flourished more quickly after the emperor's advocacy. Thus, because of all these factors and developments temple fairs became prosperous.

=== Ming dynasty ===
In the Ming dynasty, the purpose of Miaohui changed dramatically, which more similar to the form of Miaohui nowadays. Promoting business development is the goal of Miaohui in this period of time. Fewer people came for sacrifice, and instead, most of the people were intended to entertain and buy and sell products, mostly were hand-made such as kites, clay figurine, and windmill. Besides, the scale of Miaohui had been expanded at that time, and then, Miaohui became more regulated and ruled by specific guilds. The norm at that period separated urban organized temple fair with countryside organized temple fair, even though the Hongwu Emperor (Emperor of Ming dynasty) did not make such rule. Since the most important and the most admired gods only in the urban temples located nearby the royal residences. Then, the orthodox and official sacrifice of the royal family only holds in the urban so that the urban had a higher hierarchy than the temple fair in the countryside.

== Activities ==
=== Sacrifice ceremony ===
Each temple may be dedicated to one or more gods. The most traditional and important activity to celebrate a god's birthday during Miaohui is putting statues of the god on floats and parading them around the temple. Another typical type of sacrificial ceremony is to pray for children. Women would take human or monkey-like figures made of clay to the temple to pray. Such emphasis on praying for children came from the importance of having a son to carry on the family name in feudal China.

=== Folk performance ===
It includes various categories such as Chinese opera, cross talk, and magic show. The purpose of actors for performance is to earn for their living. Since the limited budget and expense of holder of temple fairs, some places would play puppet-show, which is comparatively easy to perform with lower-paying, if a live opera is too expensive for them. During the performance, sitting around the actor, bands would play the music by using various orchestras with the common characteristic that is loud, such as drums, gongs, oboes. The opera is always flourished in China, and the themes changed along with the changing of viewers' tastes.

=== Market ===
Pedlar sells small toys and objects for children and adults, and most of the products are exclusive for Miaohui. From the historical record, in the Ming and Qing dynasty, the market and trade condition was better in the South than the North. Since the prior period of the Song dynasty, the commercial trade situation of the Southern temple fair was quite common, however, with the development of the commodity economy, the function of the temple fair was gradually weakened and replaced by general commodity market or shop. Besides, in the north, temple fairs in cities and towns are famous for their daily necessities, which are mixed with non-durable consumer goods and luxury goods; the village temple fair has more production and daily necessities and is more practical.

== Food ==
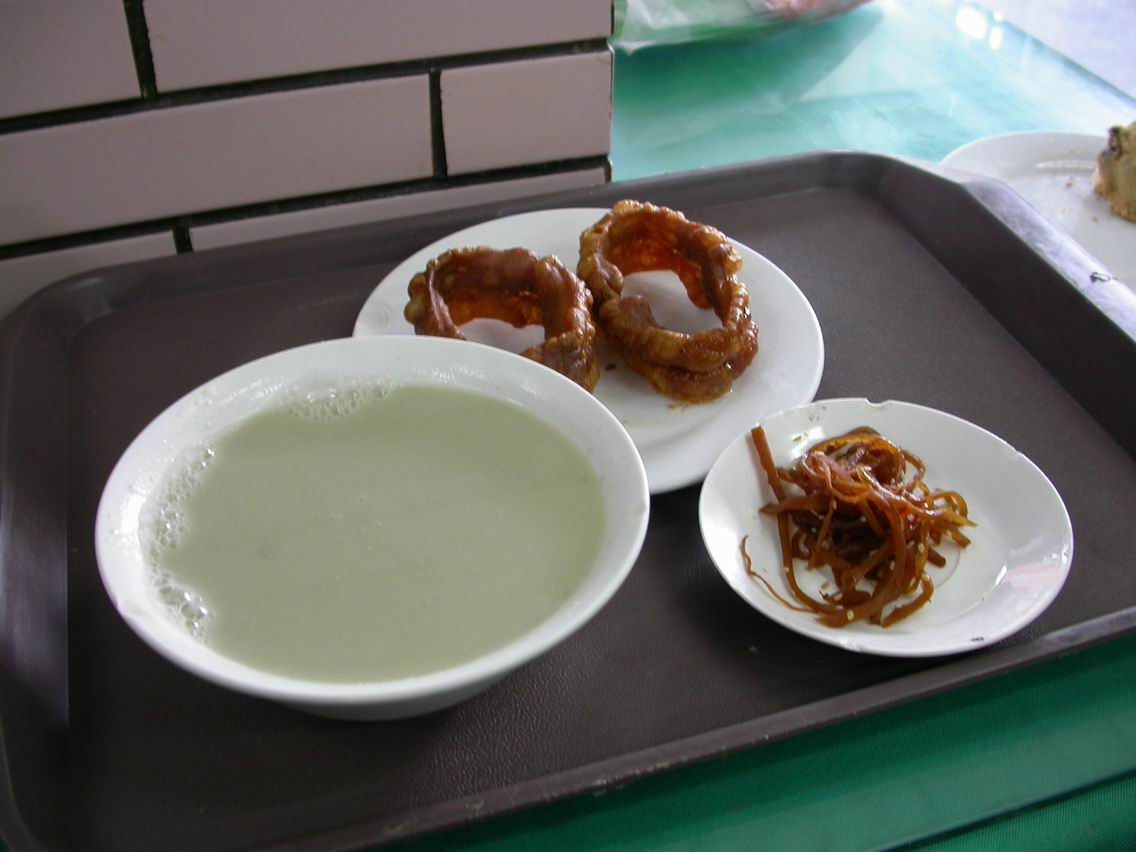
The left bowl is Douzhi

Most of the snacks on the temple fair are food sold on the streets in Beijing. They have local characteristics of Beijing and are suitable for the taste of Beijing people, forming a fixed set. From the late Qing dynasty to the modern day, there was little change. The main varieties are as follow:

=== Douzhi ===
Douzhi is a fermented drink made from ground beans.

=== Cha Tang ===
Cha Tang is a gruel of millet flour and sugar, which made by stirring fried broom corn millet, adding brown sugar, and rinsing with boiling water.

=== Lüdagun ===
Lüdagun is a kind of sticky cake. In the early years, it spread from the country to the city. The method is to steam the yellow sticky rice noodles, spread them out, sprinkle them with cooked bean noodles and brown sugar, then roll them up, like a screw.

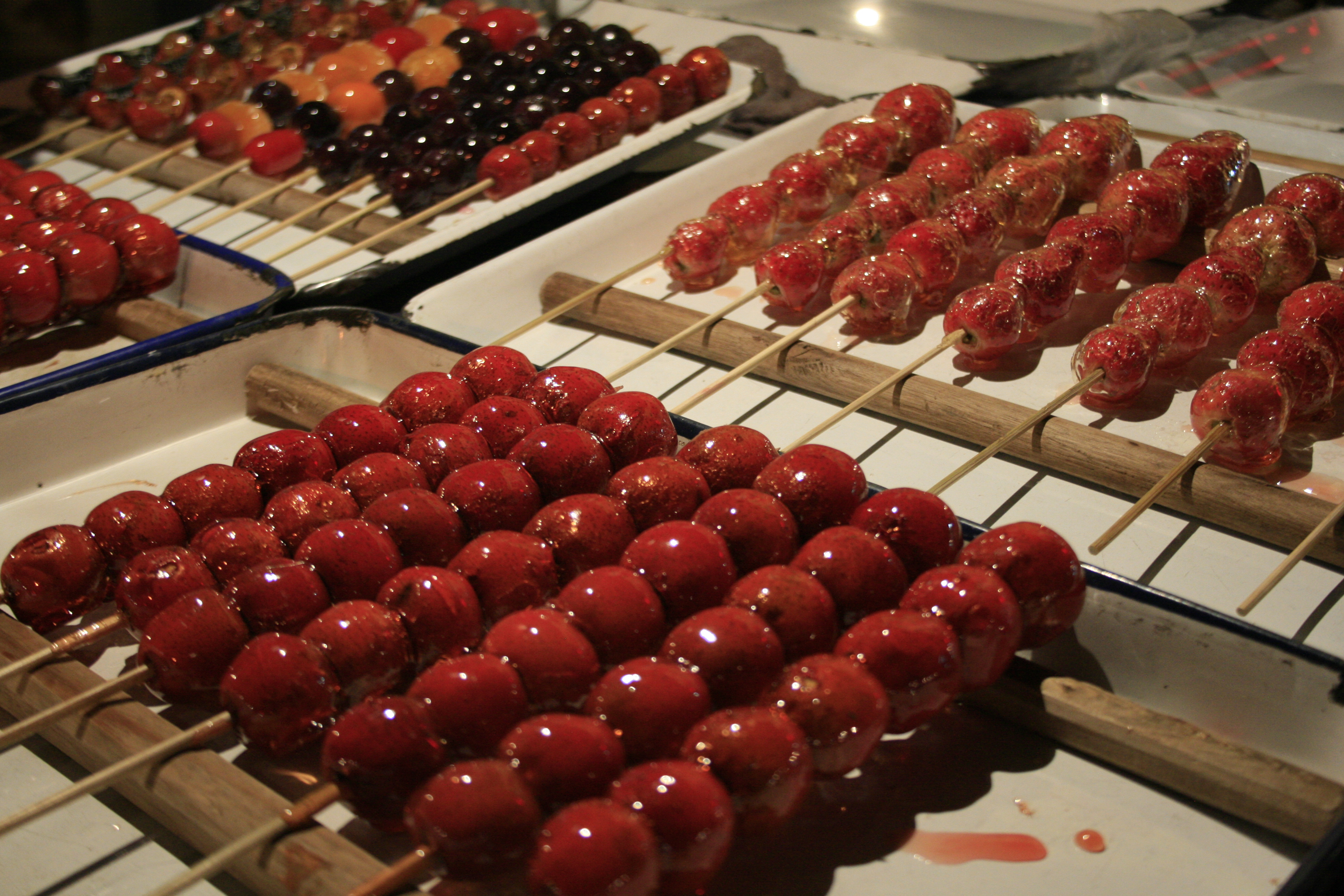
Bing Tang Hu Lu

=== Bing Tang Hu Lu (crispy sugar-coated fruits on a stick) ===
Bing Tang Hu Lu is made by stringing wild fruits with bamboo sticks and dipping them in maltose, which hardens rapidly in the wind. The typical snacks in winter in the north are usually made of hawthorn. They are thin and hard, sour and sweet, and ice.

=== Fried beanballs ===
There are two ways to eat fried beanballs. One is to cook it in soup with five flavors and sauce, and add some fried tofu, then adding vinegar, cilantro, and chili oil. The other way is to thicken the stewed meat with soup to make stewed beanballs. People could put some mashed garlic when they are eating.

== Outside Mainland China ==
=== Malaysia ===
The temple fair in Malaysia normally lasts three days. The form is kind of similar to the temple fair in China that has performances, arts, and sacrifices foods and goods to gods. However, the shows in there are more non-traditional and are local-talent variety show, which is largely come from Western models in TV and radio. Moreover, the temple art also changed from woody delicate ornament and prime colors to cement simple decor and pastel colors. In short, the elements in Malaysia temple fair are westernization that is away from Chinese traditional ideas of temple fair. Also, the changes might be caused by people in Malaysia shift their interest in temple fairs and religion from celebration to death and sickness. To be specific, the greatest Chinese festivals that Malaysia cherished the most is the funeral and curing rites. Thus, even though China's temple fair traditions influence Malaysian Chinese a lot, changes present that these tradition is gradually fading away and Malaysian Chinese fused the traditions with westernized ways.

=== Taiwan ===
Temple fairs in Taiwan are very prosperous. Temples of all sizes are held on the birthday of the gods and the day of Taoism. There are many praying activities on different scales throughout the year, such as surrounding the territory to temple pilgrimages. In the past, most folk performance in Taiwan was in the form of an array. The actors in the front of the roles were mostly children who sat in the fixed positions; actors in the back can move on the floats with the vehicles during the tour. Moreover, sports performance is the unique activity in the temple fair, such as the human pyramid, dragon and lion dance, Lift the statue on shoulders. The reason to have such performances and practices in the past is that people intended to deter other regions or tribes from maintaining regional security. Besides, the puppet theater is almost dead since the decreasing revenue caused by the changing tastes of audiences in modern society. Firework is the most attractive activity in Taiwan's Temple fair, while the main reason that draws people's attention to the pollution that temple fair might cause.

=== Hong Kong ===
The most famous temple fair in Hong Kong is the Tai Kok Tsui Temple Fair. Similar to the temple fair culture in China mainland, Hong Kong has many folk performances, including Shaolin martial arts and Taiji (a kind of traditional Chinese shadow boxing). Also, there are several stalls at the temple fair that selling wooden New Year pictures, sugar paintings, pyrography, clay sculptures, and kites, which are the cultural heritage of China.

== See also ==
- Matsuri, the Japanese equivalent

== Sources ==
- Cooper, Gene (2013). The Market and Temple Fairs of Rural China: Red Fire. Routledge. ISBN 978-1136250293.
- Davis, Edward L. (2009). Encyclopedia of Contemporary Chinese Culture. Taylor & Francis. ISBN 978-0415777162.
- Overmyer, Daniel (2009). Local Religion in North China in the Twentieth Century: The Structure and Organization of Community Rituals and Beliefs. Brill. ISBN 978-9047429364.
