= Apricot kernel =

Toxic seed of the apricot

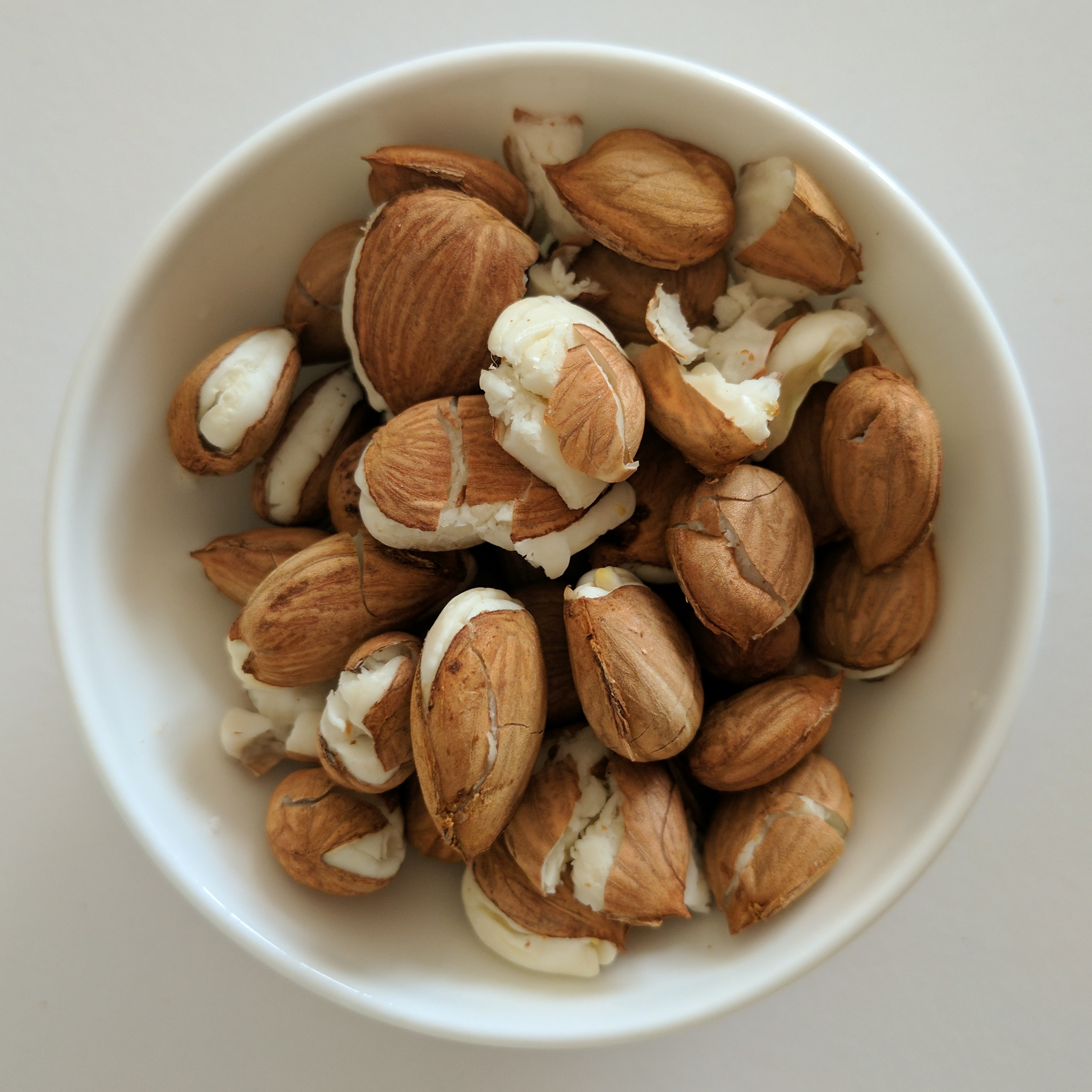
Apricot kernels

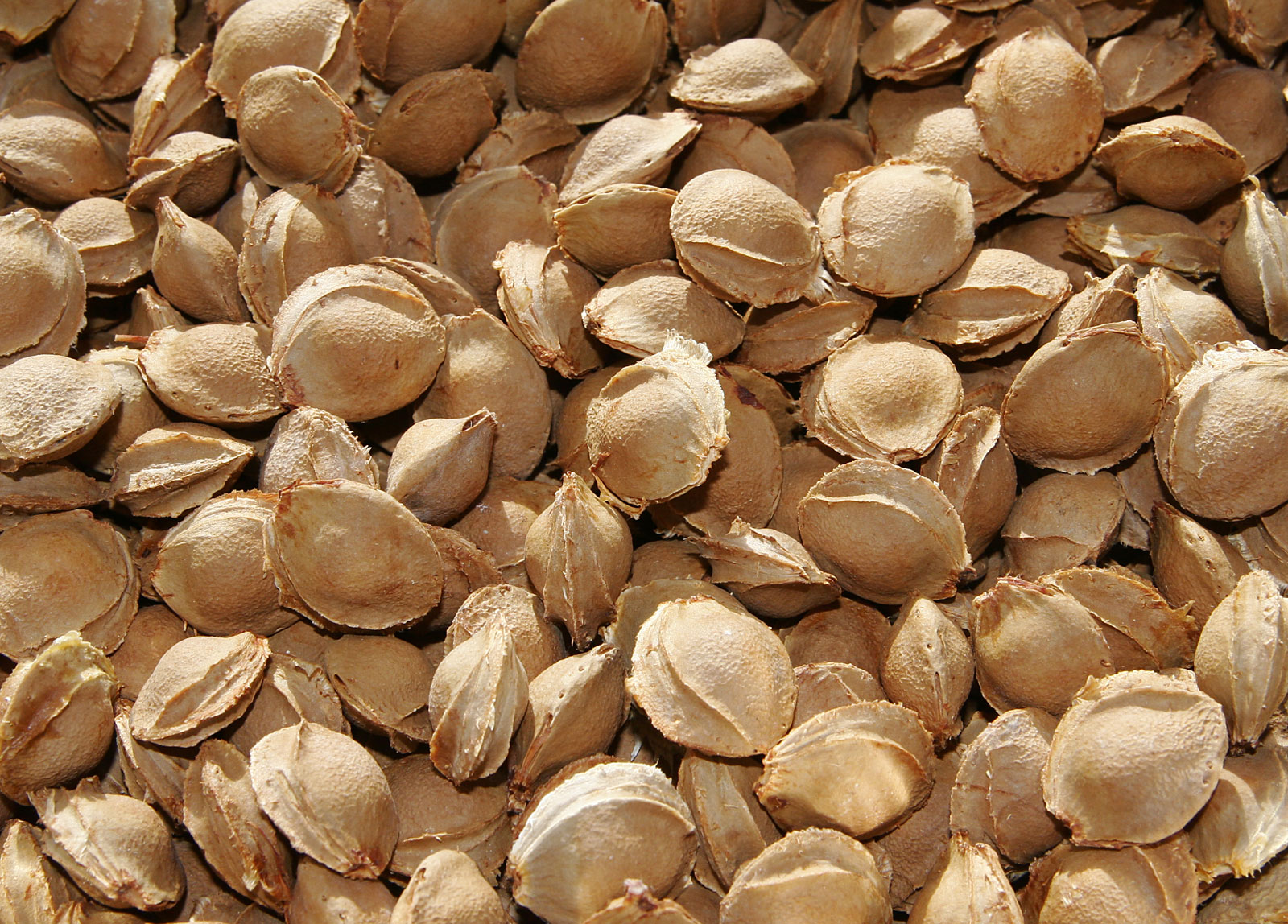
Apricot stones (kernels are inside)

An apricot kernel is the apricot seed located within the fruit endocarp, which forms a hard shell around the seed called the pyrena (stone or pit).

The kernel contains amygdalin, a poisonous compound, in concentrations that vary between cultivars. Together with the related synthetic compound laetrile, amygdalin has been marketed as an alternative cancer treatment. However, studies have found the compounds to be ineffective for treating cancer.

== Use ==
The kernel is an economically significant byproduct of fruit processing and the extracted oil and resulting press cake have value. Apricot kernel oil gives Disaronno and some other types of amaretto their almond-like flavor. They are also used in Amaretti di Saronno.

In Mandarin Chinese, the term xìngrén (杏仁) can refer to either apricot kernels or almonds. Two varieties of apricot kernels are used in Chinese cuisines; a more bitter northern variety and a sweeter southern one. In Cantonese cuisine the two are often mixed, while in Taiwanese cuisine, the southern variety is often mixed with peanuts.

Sweet apricot kernel milk or powdered sweet apricot kernels are used as a main ingredient in annin tofu or "almond tofu", a custard-like dessert dish from China and Japan that does not necessarily contain almonds or soy. Almonds or almond milk is often used as an alternative to apricot kernels in the recipe.

They contain amygdalin, which is also known as laetrile. Amygdalin is made up of three components: glucose, benzaldehyde, and cyanide. The amygdalin found in apricot seeds has been marketed as an alternative cancer treatment; however, studies have shown it to be ineffective in treating cancer. Cancer Council Australia have commented that "eating apricot kernels in large amounts is not only ineffective for treating cancer, but could also be very dangerous".

== Potential toxicity ==
Apricot kernels can cause potentially fatal cyanide poisoning when consumed. Symptoms include nausea, fever, headaches, insomnia, increased thirst, lethargy, nervousness, various aches and pains in joints and muscles, and a drop in blood pressure.

In 2016, the European Food Safety Authority reported that eating three small bitter apricot kernels or half of a large bitter kernel would exceed safe consumption levels of amygdalin and potentially cause cyanide poisoning. The Food Safety Authority of Ireland advises against eating either bitter or sweet varieties of apricot kernel due to the risk of cyanide poisoning and advises consumption be limited to one to two kernels a day for an adult. They also advise against consuming bitter almond for the same reasons.

In 1993, the New York State Department of Agriculture and Markets tested the cyanide content of two 220 gram (8 oz) packages of bitter apricot kernels imported from Pakistan that were being sold in health-food stores as a snack. The results showed that each package, if consumed entirely, contained at least double the minimum lethal dosage of cyanide for an adult human; the product was removed from stores. There was one reported case in the medical literature of cyanide toxicity from apricot kernels from 1979 to 1998 in the United States, a non-fatal poisoning by purchased apricot kernels.
