= Chinese desserts =

Sweet dishes in Chinese cuisine

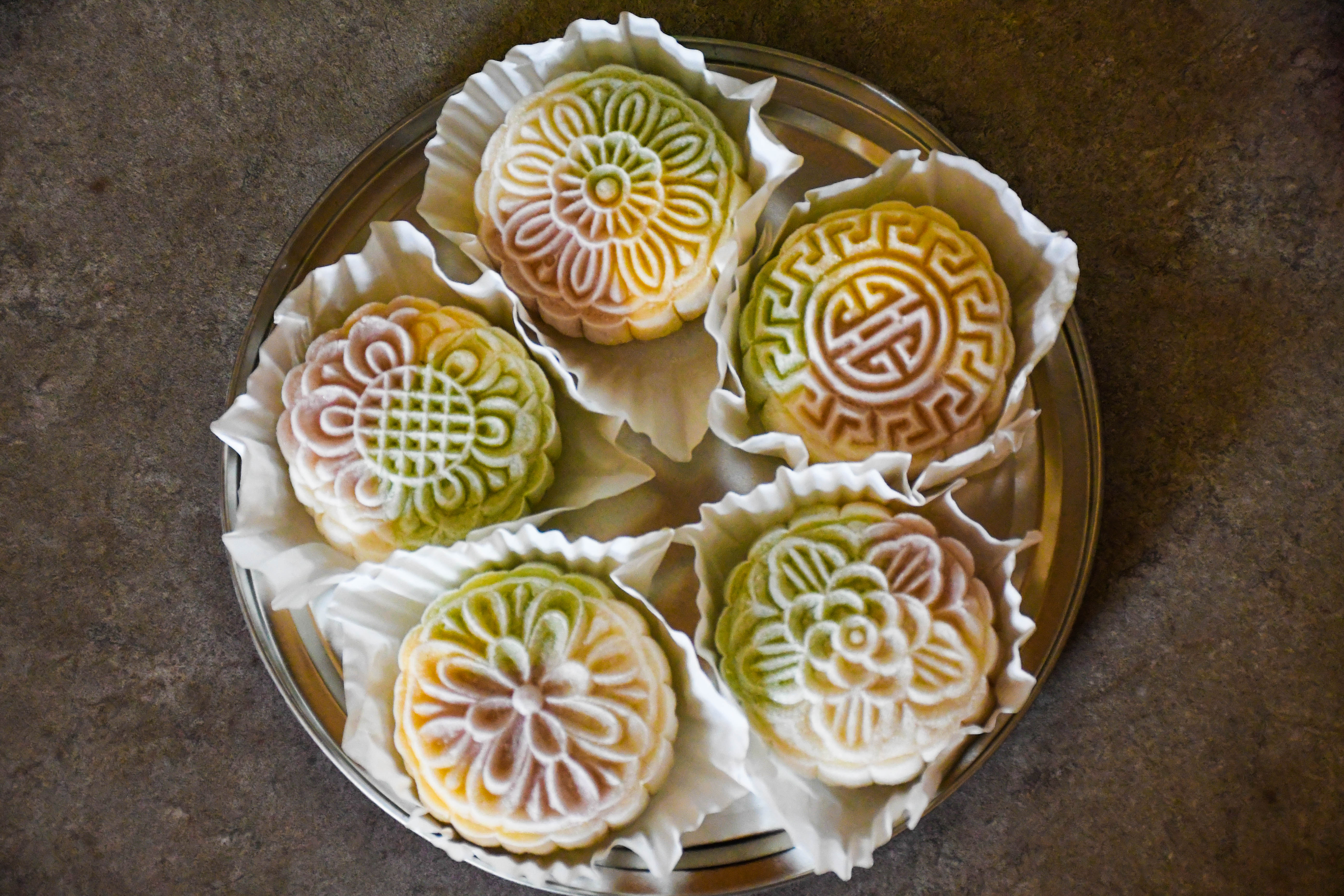
- Type: Confectionery
- Place of origin: China
- Associated cuisine: Chinese cuisine

Chinese desserts (simplified Chinese: 中式甜点; traditional Chinese: 中式甜點; pinyin: Zhōngshì tiándiǎn) are sweet foods and dishes that are served with tea, along with meals or at the end of meals in Chinese cuisine. The desserts encompass a wide variety of ingredients commonly used in East Asian cuisines such as powdered or whole glutinous rice, sweet bean pastes, and agar. Due to the many Chinese cultures and the long history of China, there are a great variety of desserts of many forms.

== Categories ==
The numerous desserts found in China can be roughly divided into several categories. For a list of more specific types of desserts, see List of Chinese desserts.

=== Bing ===
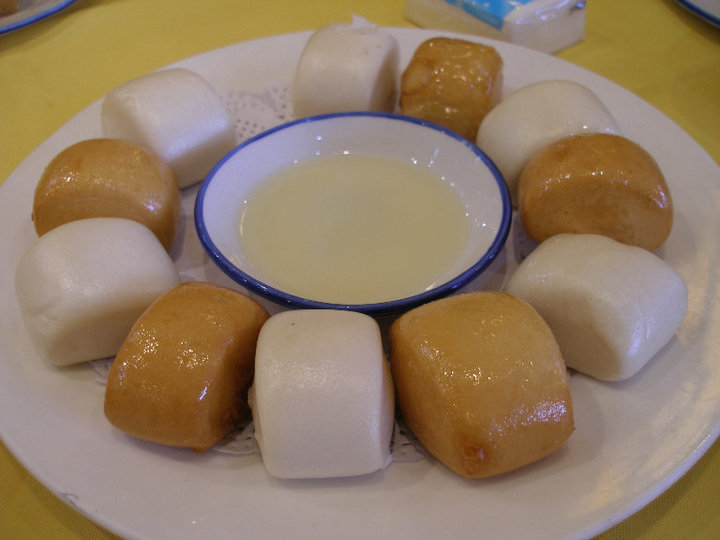
Steamed and deep fried Mantou, often served with sweetened condensed milk as a dessert

Bing (饼; 餅; bǐng) are baked wheat flour based confections. These are either similar to the short-pastry crust of western cuisine or flaky puff pastry, the latter of which is often known as su (酥; 酥; sū). The preferred fat used for bing is usually lard. Common bing types include moon cake, sun cake (Beijing and Taiwan varieties) and wife cake.

=== Candies ===
Chinese candies and sweets, called táng (糖; 糖; p=táng), are usually made with cane sugar, malt sugar, and honey. These sweets often consists of nuts or fruits that are mixed into syrup whole or in pastes to flavour or give the candies their textures. Dragon's beard candy and White Rabbit Creamy Candy are some examples of this category.

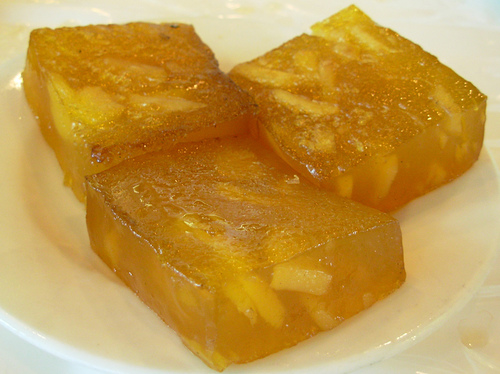
Panfried water chestnut cake (马蹄糕; 馬蹄糕; mǎtí gāo), a type of Chinese gao dessert

=== Guo ===
Gao or guo (糕; 糕; gāo or 粿; guǒ) are rice-based snacks that are typically steamed and may be made from glutinous or normal rice. In Fukien speaking Chinese populations, these are known as Kuei, which are based on the Fukien pronunciation of "粿". These rice-based snacks have a wide variety of textures and can be chewy, jelly-like, fluffy or rather firm and unlike bings very different from western pastries. Various types of gao include Nian gao, Bai Tang Gao, Tangyuan and Ang Ku Kueh.

=== Soups ===
Chinese dessert soups (汤; 湯; tāng or 糊; 糊; hú) typically consists of sweet and usually hot soups and custards. They are collectively known as tong sui in Cantonese. Some of these soups are made with restorative properties in mind, in concordance with traditional Chinese medicine. A commonly eaten dessert soup is douhua.

=== Jellies ===
Chinese jellies are known collectively in the language as jellies or ices (冻; 凍; dòng or 冰; bīng). Many jelly desserts are traditionally set with agar and are flavored with fruits, bean paste or flavoring, such as shing ren do fu, though gelatin based jellies are also common in contemporary desserts. Some Chinese jellies, such as the grass jelly and the aiyu jelly set by themselves.

=== Ices ===
Shaved ice desserts (刨冰; 刨冰; bào bīng) with sweet condiments and syrup is common eaten as a dessert in Chinese culture. Ice cream is also commonly available throughout China.

== See also ==
- Hangwa – Korean confections
- Wagashi – Japanese confections
- Chinese bakery products
- Huangqiao Sesame Cake
