= Taro purée =

Chinese dessert

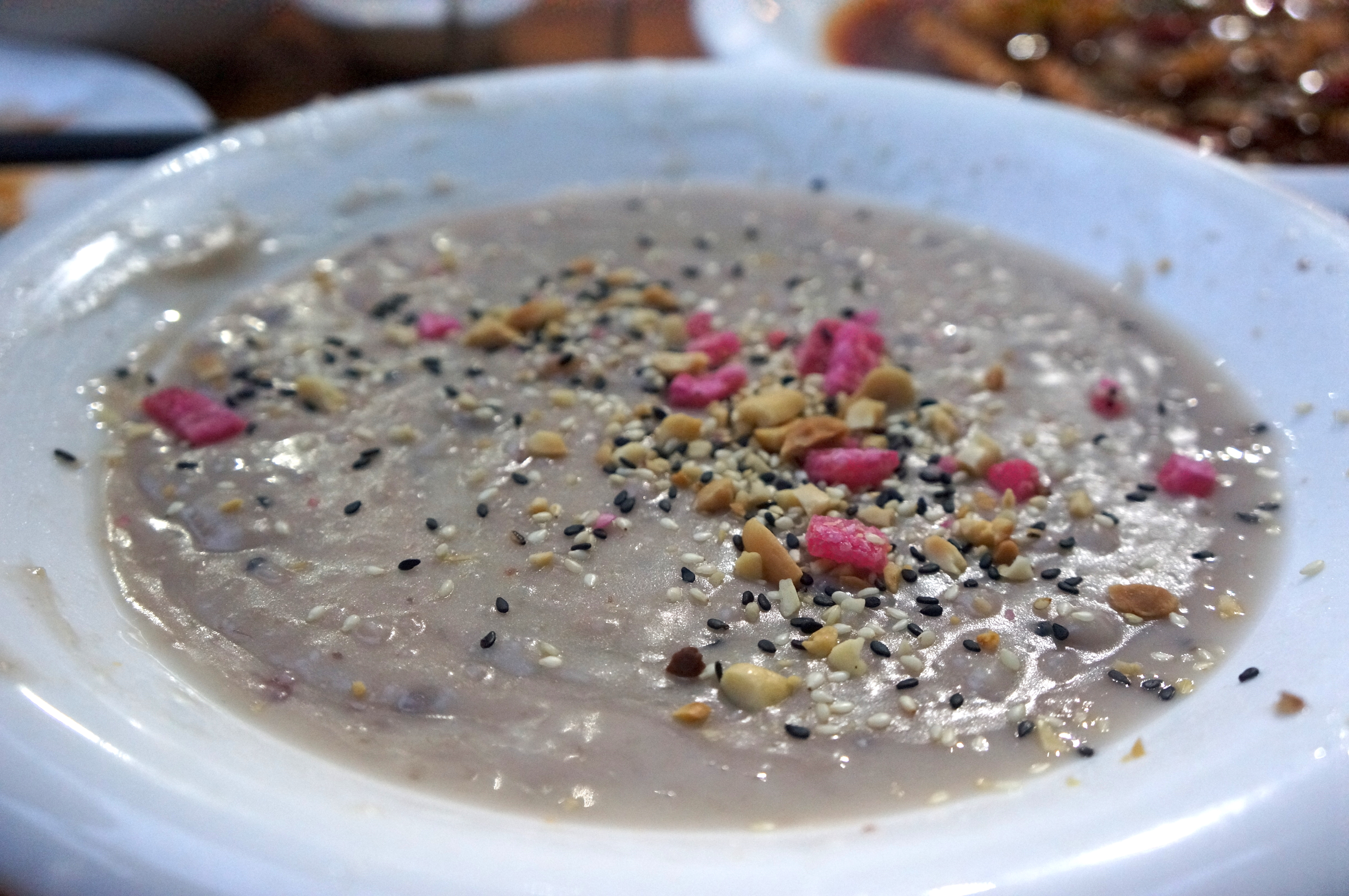
- A bowl of taro purée served in a flat plate, topped with roasted sesame seeds, melon seeds, and candied ginkgo.
- Alternative names: Taro mash, Taro paste
- Place of origin: China, Taiwan
- Region or state: Fujian Province, Republic of China
- Main ingredients: Taro, lard, sugar
- Similar dishes: Ube halaya

Taro purée, also known as taro mash or taro paste, (Chinese: 芋泥; pinyin: yùní; Pe̍h-ōe-jī: ō̍‑nî) is a traditional dessert in Fujianese cuisine and Teochew cuisine. Made from puréed taro and lard and served on a flat plate, the dessert is normally topped with toasted sesame seeds, and occasionally with candied ginkgo, red dates, or melon seeds.

== See also ==
- List of Chinese desserts
- Poi (food)
