= JingBaJian =

China's Old day

- Type: Confectionery
- Place of origin: China
- Main ingredients: Cake: oil, flour, water Filling: dates, plum, raisin, rose, red bean paste, sugar, banana, salt and pepper

JingBaJian (Chinese: 京八件; pinyin: jīng bā jiàn) is a series of eight Chinese desserts created by the Qing Imperial kitchen. It is an improvement on traditional imperial pastry called the 'big eight'. Each dessert holds a different meaning: happiness, success, long life, luck, wealth, education, excess and fertility.

JingBaJian (the eight-set Beijing style pastry) is a traditional Chinese cake. "Jing" refers to Beijing and BaJian means eight pieces. It was originally made in the Imperial kitchen. With time, this dessert became popular among the public. Each cake contains a different type of stuffing baked into unique shapes. The ingredients include dates, plums, raisins, rose, red bean, sugar, banana, pepper and salt. JingBaJian evolved considerably, incorporating new ingredients such as mung bean and Liao flowers.
