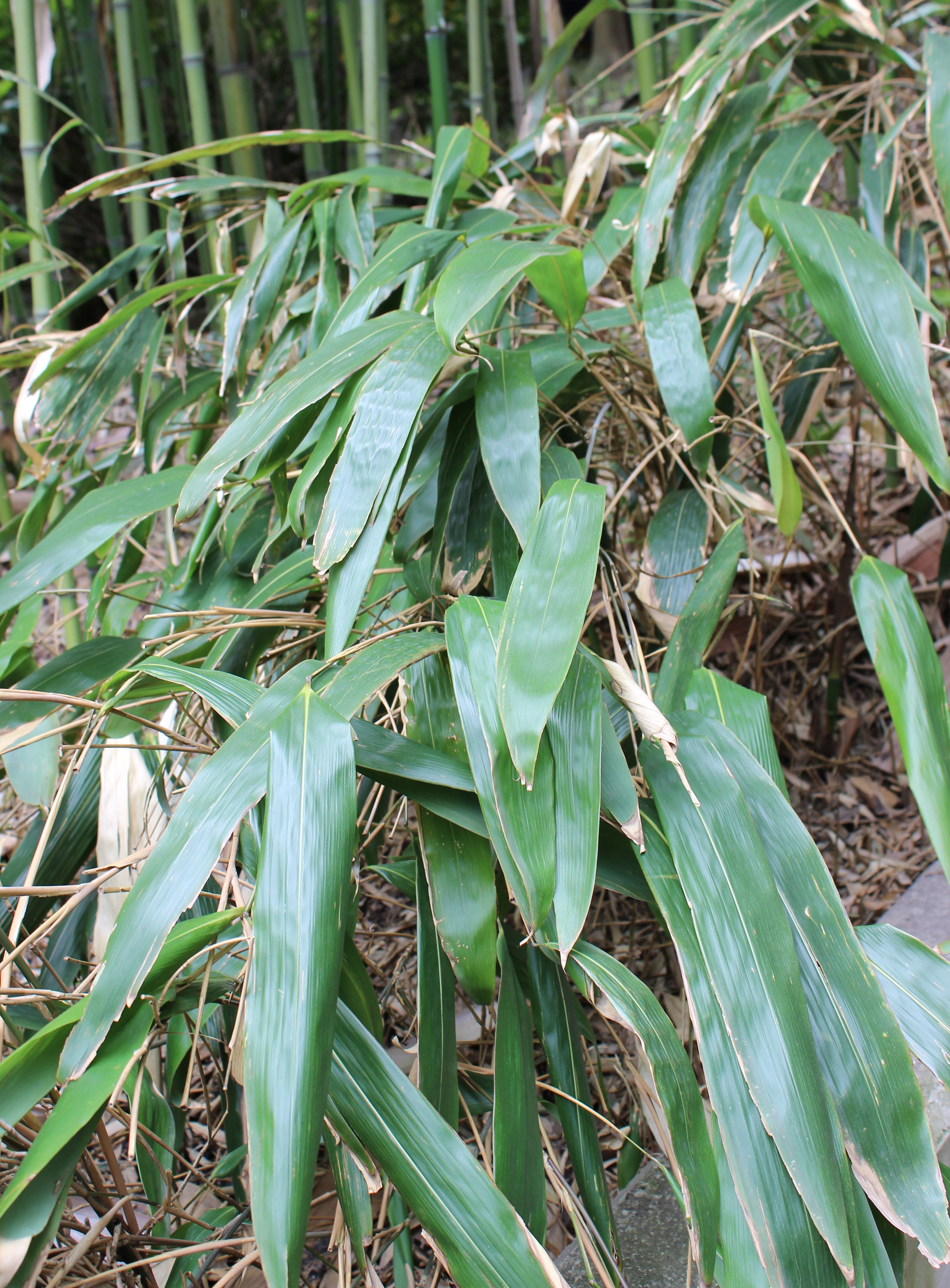

Scientific classification
- Kingdom: Plantae
- Clade: Tracheophytes
- Clade: Angiosperms
- Clade: Monocots
- Clade: Commelinids
- Order: Poales
- Family: Poaceae
- Genus: Indocalamus
- Species: I. tessellatus

Binomial name
- Indocalamus tessellatus (Munro) Keng f.

Synonyms
- Arundinaria ragamowskii; Bambusa tessellata; Sasa tessellata; Sasamorpha tessellata

= Indocalamus tessellatus =

Species of grass

Indocalamus tessellatus, the large-leaved bamboo, is a species of flowering plant in the grass family Poaceae, native to China. A medium-sized, hardy evergreen bamboo growing to 2 m (6.6 ft), it forms a clump of broad leaves 60 cm (24 in) long and up to 10 cm (3.9 in) wide – the broadest of any bamboo – which cause the slender cane to bend under their weight. Though hardy down to −15 °C (5 °F) and able to survive conditions in most of the UK, it prefers a sheltered site in semi-shade with moist, rich soil. Given the best conditions possible, it will eventually form large thickets or groves, but can be kept in a large container. In cultivation in the UK it has gained the Royal Horticultural Society's Award of Garden Merit.
