= Almond tofu =

East Asian jellied dessert made from almonds

Almond Tofu
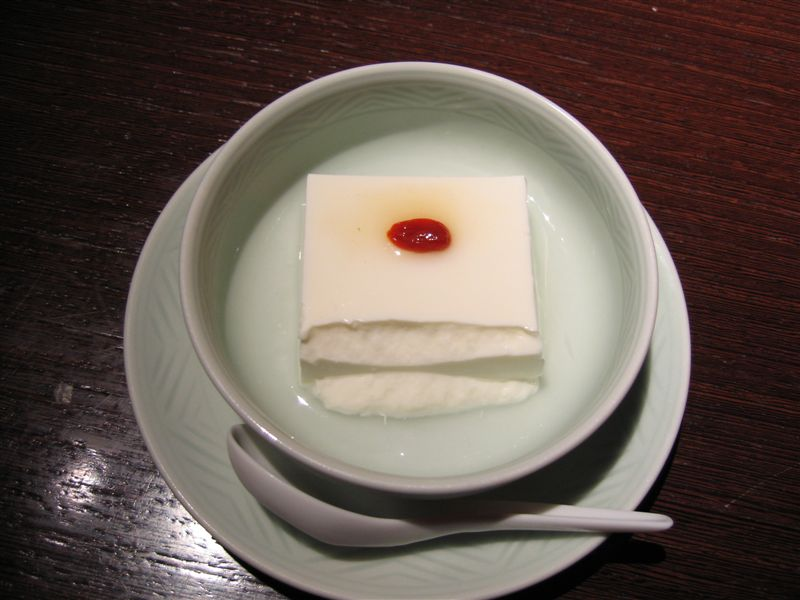
- A bowl of almond tofu
- Alternative names: almond tofu, almond jelly, almond float
- Type: Pudding
- Main ingredients: Apricot kernel milk, water, gelling agent (usually agar)

Almond tofu

Chinese name
- Chinese: 杏仁豆腐
- Jyutping: hang6 jan4 dau6 fu6
- Hanyu Pinyin: xìngrén dòufǔ
- Literal meaning: apricot kernel tofu
Transcriptions
Standard Mandarin
- Hanyu Pinyin: xìngrén dòufǔ
Wu
- Romanization: ghan nyin deu vu
Yue: Cantonese
- Jyutping: hang6 jan4 dau6 fu6
Southern Min
- Hokkien POJ: hēng-jîn-tāu-hū hēng-lîn-tāu-hū

Japanese name
- Kanji: 杏仁豆腐
- Kana: あんにんどうふ
Transcriptions
- Romanization: annindōfu

Almond tofu (Chinese and Japanese: 杏仁豆腐; pinyin: xìngrén dòufǔ; Cantonese Jyutping: hang6 jan4 dau6 fu6; rōmaji: annindōfu) is a soft, jellied dessert made of apricot kernel milk, agar, and sugar popular throughout East Asia.

The name "tofu" here refers to "tofu-like solid"; soy beans, which are the main ingredient of tofu, are not used, nor coagulated as soybeans would be to make tofu. This naming convention is also seen in other East Asian dishes, such as Chinese yúdòufu (魚豆腐) and Japanese gomadōfu (胡麻豆腐). Apricot kernel milk is often confused with almond milk, as apricot kernels themselves are often confused with almonds.

== Preparation ==
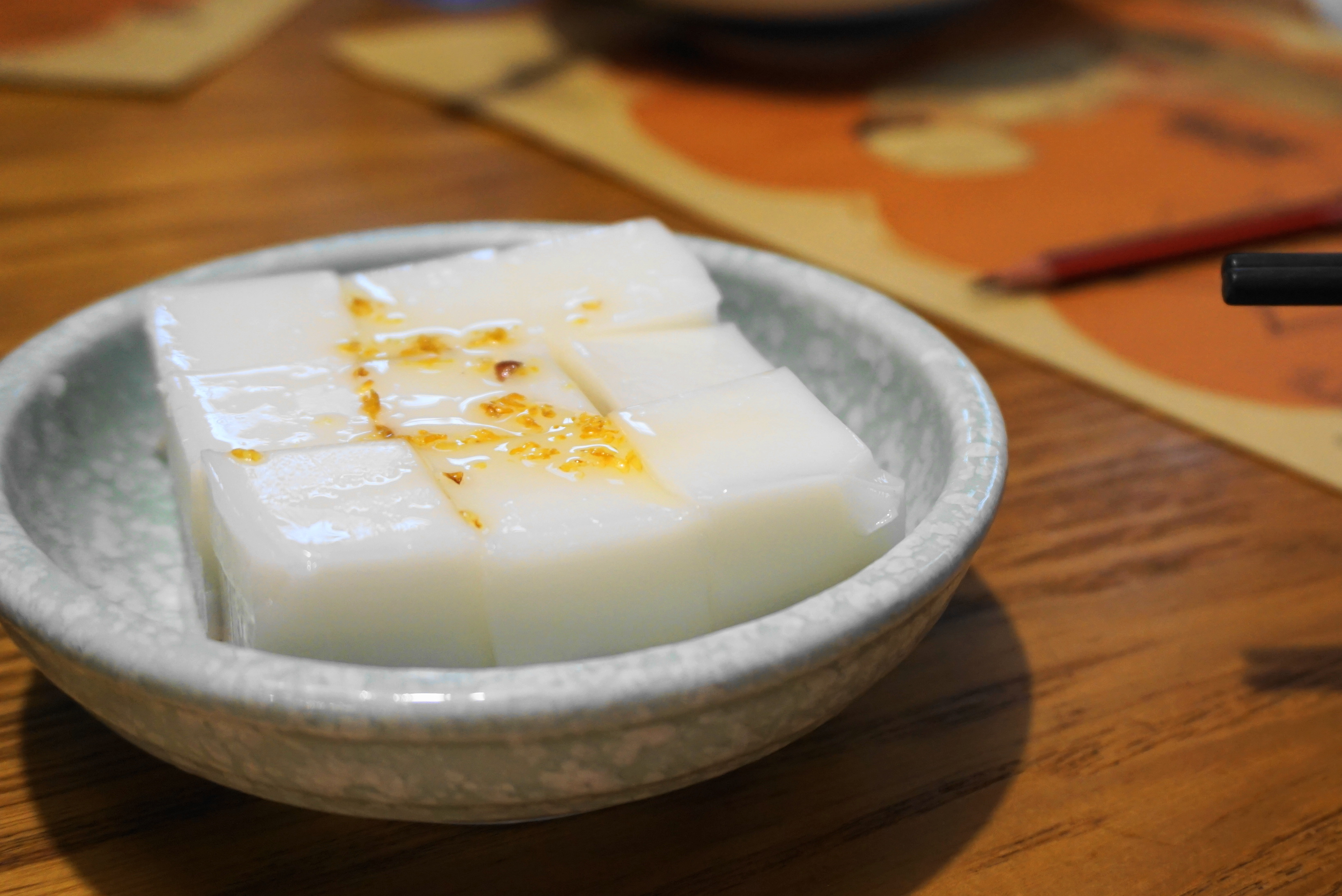
Annin tofu with Osmanthus-honey dressing.

In the traditional recipe, the primary flavoring agent is apricot kernels, soaked and ground with water. The mixture is strained, sweetened, and heated with a gelling agent (usually agar). When chilled, the apricot kernel milk mixture solidifies into the consistency of a soft gelatin dessert.

Although the agar-based recipe is vegan, there are numerous nontraditional recipes that are not. Most are based on dairy products and a small amount of flavored extract. Gelatin is also a common substitute for agar. Annin jelly can be made from scratch or using instant mix. There is an instant soy-based powder with a coagulating agent, which dissolves in hot water and solidifies upon cooling.

In Taiwanese cuisine, the dish uses the sweeter southern variety of apricot kernels which are mixed with peanuts. In Taipei, the dessert originated as a food stall dish, but is now also served in banquets halls and hotel restaurants. In Hawaii where it is commonly known as "almond float", it was introduced by Chinese immigrants starting in the 1850s, it is now usually made with gelatin and almond extract and typically mixed with canned fruit cocktail and canned lychee.

== See also ==
- Crème caramel
- List of Chinese desserts
- List of desserts
