= Suncake =

Suncake may refer to:

- Suncake (Taiwan), a popular Taiwanese dessert originally from the city of Taichung in Taiwan
- Suncake (Beijing), a dessert in Beijing cuisine
