= Lüdagun =

Traditional Chinese snack food

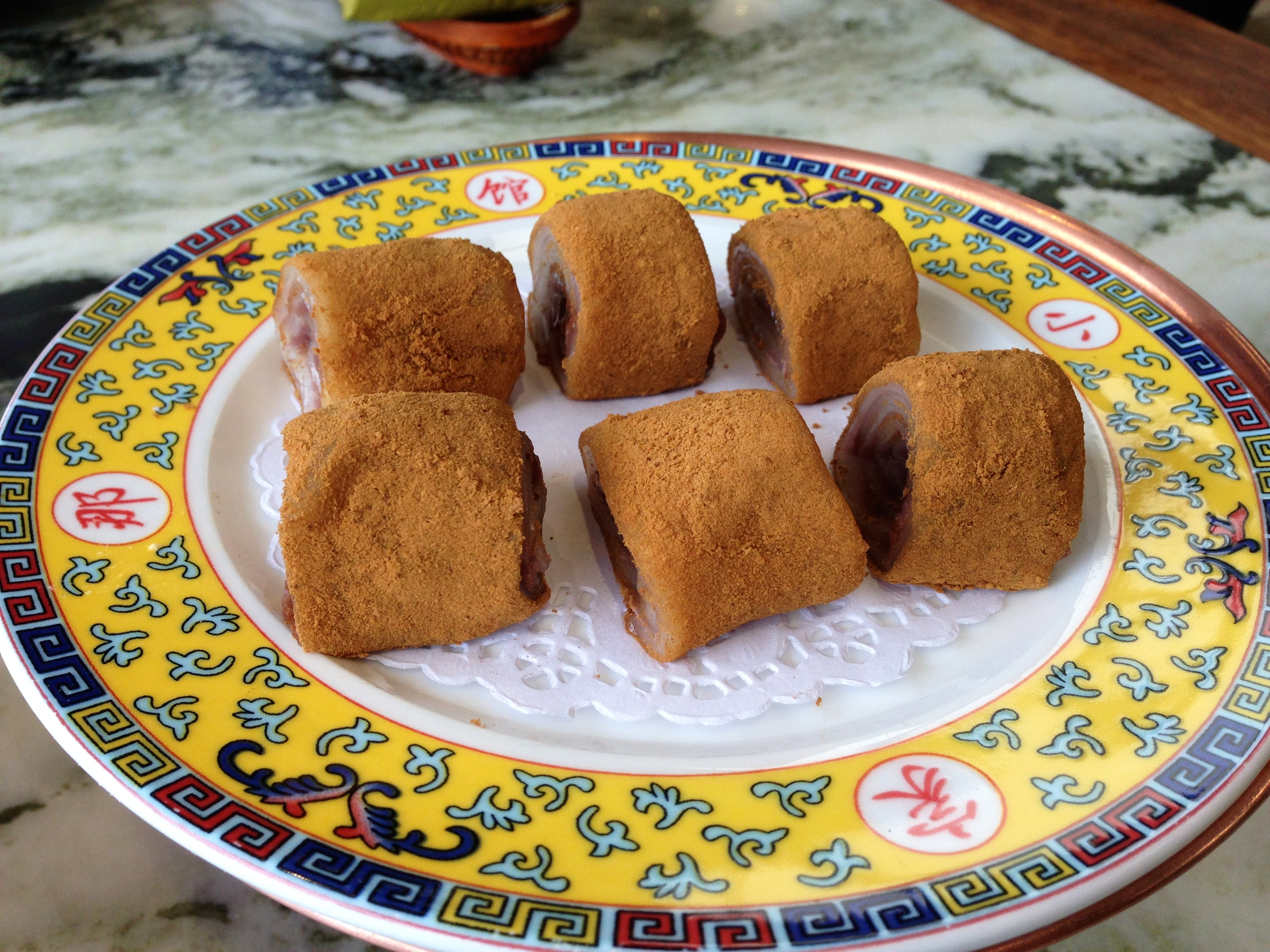
- Lüdagun
- Alternative names: Lyu Da Gun, Lvdagun, Doumiangao, fried chop rice cake
- Type: Pastry
- Place of origin: China
- Region or state: Manchuria, Beijing
- Main ingredients: Sticky rice, red bean paste, soybean flour, brown sugar syrup

Lüdagun
- Traditional Chinese: 驢打滾
- Simplified Chinese: 驴打滚
- Literal meaning: Donkey rolling
Transcriptions
Standard Mandarin
- Hanyu Pinyin: Lǘ dǎ gǔn

Doumiangao
- Traditional Chinese: 豆麵糕
- Simplified Chinese: 豆面糕
- Literal meaning: Pastry in soybean flour
Transcriptions
Standard Mandarin
- Hanyu Pinyin: Dòu miàn gāo

Lüdagun (simplified Chinese: 驴打滚; traditional Chinese: 驢打滾; pinyin: lǘdǎgǔn; lit. 'rolling donkey') is a traditional Manchu snack in China. It originated in Manchuria and later became famous in Beijing. The yellow soybean flour sprinkled over the pastry makes it look like a donkey rolling on the loess, which gave rise to its Chinese name, "Lüdagun" (rolling donkey). In the Beijing dialect, erhua causes the name to be pronounced as 驴打滚儿; lǘdǎgǔnr.

== Origins ==
The origin of the lüdagun is recounted in a folk tale. The story goes that during the Qing Dynasty, Empress Dowager Cixi was tired of imperial food, so she asked the royal chef to cook something new. After some deliberation, the chef decided to make a dish using sticky rice and red bean paste. When the chef finished cooking, a young eunuch, named Lü (pronounced as "lyu", the same pronunciation as donkey in Chinese), carelessly dropped the dish into soya bean flour, but there was no time to re-make the dish. The chef had to serve it to Cixi. However, Cixi praised the taste and wondered what the name of the dish was. The chef had never thought about this question, but he named it as "Lüdagun" to credit eunuch Lu's carelessness.

== Ingredients ==
=== Modern Lüdagun ===
The main ingredients are sticky rice flour, red bean paste, and soybean flour. The exact recipe for making a lüdagun may vary depended on regions and eras, but the general steps for making a modern lüdagun are described as follows. The sticky rice flour is first mixed with warm water to a dough, then after being steamed, the sticky rice paste is shaped into a long strip covered with red bean paste on top, and then it is rolled up into a cylinder-shaped pastry. Finally the pastry is sprinkled with soybean flour, and it is ready to be served.

=== Traditional Lüdagun ===
Compared to a modern Lüdagun, the filling in a traditional Lüdagun is brown sugar syrup rather than red bean paste. The recipe of making a traditional Lüdagun and the scenario of selling a Lüdagun is documented by Zhang Jiangcai (simplified Chinese: 张江裁) in "Popular Food and Goods in Yanjing" (simplified Chinese:燕京民间食货史料) :

Simplified Chinese	Traditional Chinese	Pinyin	Translation
驴打滚，乃用黄米粘面蒸熟，裹以红糖水为馅，滚于炒豆面中，使成球形。燕市各大庙会集市时，多有售此者。兼亦有沿街叫卖，近年则少见矣。	驢打滾，乃用黃米粘面蒸熟，裹以紅糖水為餡，滾於炒豆麵中，使成球形。燕市各大廟會集市時，多有售此者。兼亦有沿街叫賣，近年則少見矣。	Lǘ dǎ gǔn, nǎi yòng huáng mǐ zhān miàn zhēng shú, guǒ yǐ hóng táng shuǐ wèi xiàn, gǔn yú chǎo dòu miàn zhōng, shǐ chéng qiú xíng. Yàn shì gè dà miào huì jí shì shí, duō yǒu shòu cǐ zhě. Jiān yì yǒu yán jiē jiào mài, jìn nián zé shǎo jiàn yǐ.	Lüdagun, is first made from steaming the millet flour to a dough, then filled with brown sugar syrup, and finally rolled in fried soya bean flour to a ball. People sell lüdagun in temple fairs or markets. People also sell ludagun on the street, but it is less commonly seen these days.

A similar recipe is also documented in a poem called "Lüdagun" in "The Custom of Peking" (simplified Chinese:北平民俗类征):

Simplified Chinese	Traditional Chinese	Pinyin	Translation
红糖水馅巧安排， 黄面成团豆里埋。 何事群呼驴打滚， 称名未免近诙谐。	紅糖水餡巧安排， 黃面成團豆裡埋。 何事群呼驢打滾， 稱名未免近詼諧。	Hóng táng shuǐ xiàn qiǎo ān pái, huáng miàn chéng tuán dòu lǐ mái. Hé shì qún hū ‘lǘ dǎ gǔn’, chēng míng wèi miǎn jìn huī xié.	Brown sugar syrup is made as filling, yellow dough is buried in soybean flour. It looks like a rolling donkey, this is rather too hilarious.
