= Herbal tea shop =

Store selling Chinese herbal tea

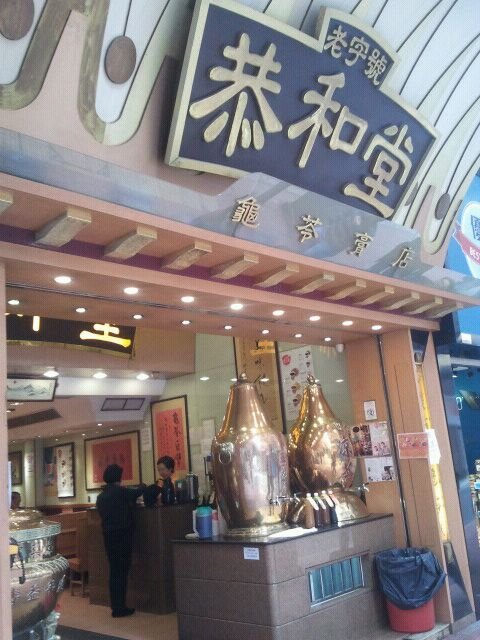
A Chinese herbal tea shop in Causeway Bay, Hong Kong

Herbal tea shops (Chinese: 涼茶舖) are stores that specialise in selling Chinese herbal tea. They are mostly found in southern Chinese cities.

== In Hong Kong ==
=== History ===
==== Before 1940s ====
Back in the 1930s, herbal tea shops were not popular. There were only a limited number of street vendors that sold herbal tea on the street.

==== 1940s to Early 1960s ====
In the 1940s, the popularity of herbal tea grew as the public realised the efficacy of herbal tea brought was higher. From then onwards, shops that only sold herbal tea opened in residential areas with a small floor area and gained in popularity in the whole of Hong Kong. Their primary source of customers was residents who lived nearby, and the owners or staff usually had an intimate relationship with their customers.

Until the late 1960s, herbal tea shops acted as a semi-public space where the public could go for entertainment. As there were jukeboxes in the shops, it was common for the public to spend their leisure time in the shop socializing with friends or simply enjoying the music and the atmosphere. Apart from this development, some of the shops opened near cinemas so they could attract cinema-goers with their snacks such as fish balls.

==== Late 1960s to 1970s ====
In the late 1960s, philosophical ideas like modernism and scientism were promoted in Hong Kong. This occurrence prompted the construction of a new metropolitan Hong Kong identity. Since the herbal tea shops were deemed as a symbol of traditional Chineseness, they were abandoned for the sake of establishing a city of modernity and internationality.

During the 1970s, the herbal tea shops gradually lost their role in social integration. As a result of the alleviated housing problems, the public's need for public space like herbal tea shops was reduced. Consequently, the number of herbal tea shops began to decrease significantly from the late 1960s to the 1970s.

==== Late 1980s to 1990s ====
A wave of nostalgic swept Hong Kong from the 1980s to 1990s due to the public's anticipation of the handover. During this period of time, many herbal tea shops opened to satisfy the demand. The shops acted as a bridge connecting Hong Kong people to their Hong Kong identity and helped them to cope with their identity crisis.

==== 2000s and onwards ====
===== Intangible Cultural Heritage =====
In 2006, the herbal tea shops regained their popularity after the inclusion of herbal tea formulas and shop brands in the Intangible Cultural Heritage list. According to UNESCO, Intangible Cultural Heritage is a counterpart of World Heritage that focuses on the intangible aspect of culture. Herbal tea meets the four requirements of traditional, contemporary, representative and community-based. The two selection criteria of the formulas are that they must have more than eighty years of history and be passed on continuously with strict protective measures. The formulas selected are then allowed to be called “herbal tea”. Nineteen herbal tea shop brands were also included in the list and some of them are located in Hong Kong.

===== Modernisation =====
Due to the change in public's taste and habits, herbal tea shops have to include other snacks and drinks in their menus to diversify their products. The modernized shops tend to sell products like desserts, snacks, fruit juice and so on. Many of their products incorporate Chinese medicinal ingredients with Western desserts or snacks, in hopes to modify their business model and cope with the rise of health-consciousness and the people's ever-changing eating habits.

== Special Feature ==
=== Containers to store herbal tea ===
==== Calabash ====
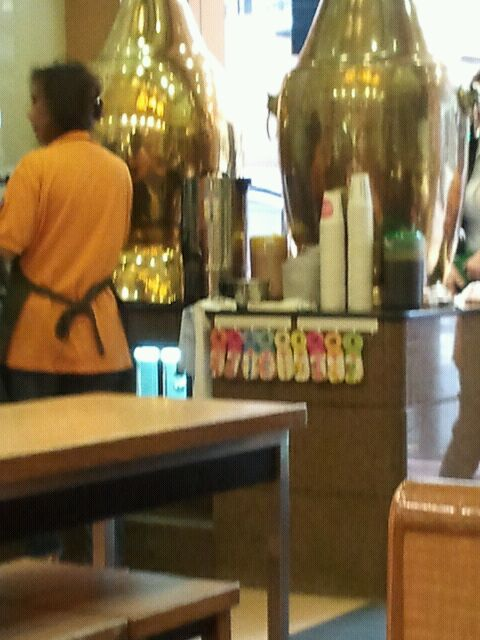
Golden gourds

Traditionally, Calabash, or Golden Gourds (Chinese: 金葫蘆), were regarded as symbol of herbal tea shops because calabash-shaped bottles are used to hold herbal tea. This symbol originated from a traditional Chinese story, in which the liquid in a calabash-shaped bottle cured sick people. In the 1940s, each herbal tea shop had two to three golden gourds with taps to store the herbal tea.

==== Thermo flasks and metal tanks ====
Later in the 1950s, the shops used thermo flasks and metal tanks to store and maintain the temperature of the herbal tea. To serve the customers, the staff would pour the herbal tea into porcelain bowls or cups.

=== Containers to make herbal tea ===
Prior to the 1970s, many shops would use a traditional clay pot to boil herbal tea. From the 1970s onwards, the shops began to use bigger copper tanks to boil herbal tea to increase the volume of herbal tea produced.

=== Setting ===
At the entrance of traditional herbal tea shops, there would be a table with various bowls of herbal teas placed on it. The bowls are covered with a glass-cover to prevent the herbal tea from cooling and also prevent impurities in the air from reaching the herbal tea. This setting enables customers to stand outside of the shop to drink herbal tea conveniently.

== Notable goods sold in the shops ==
=== Notable herbal tea sold ===
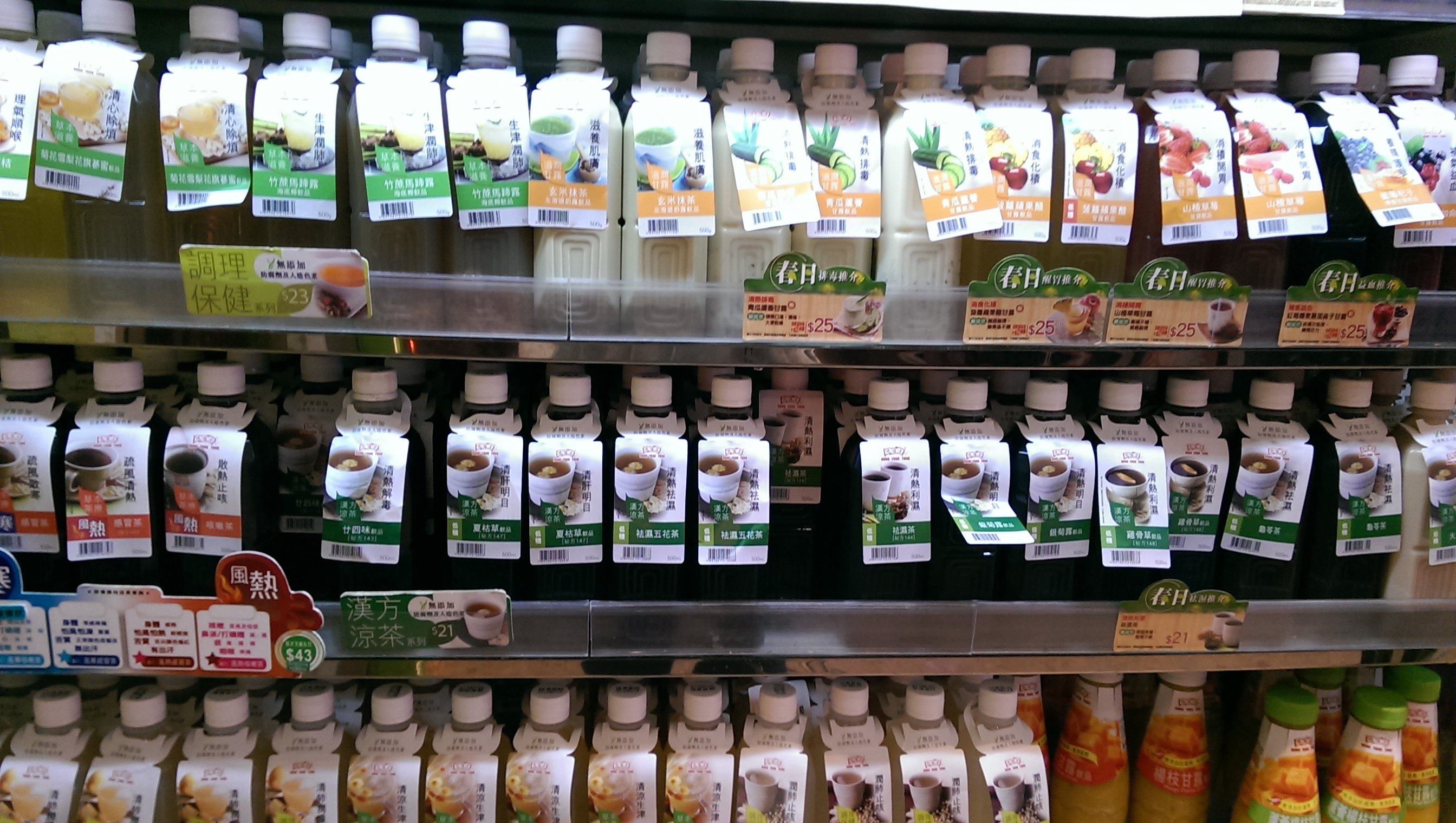
Various types of herbal tea

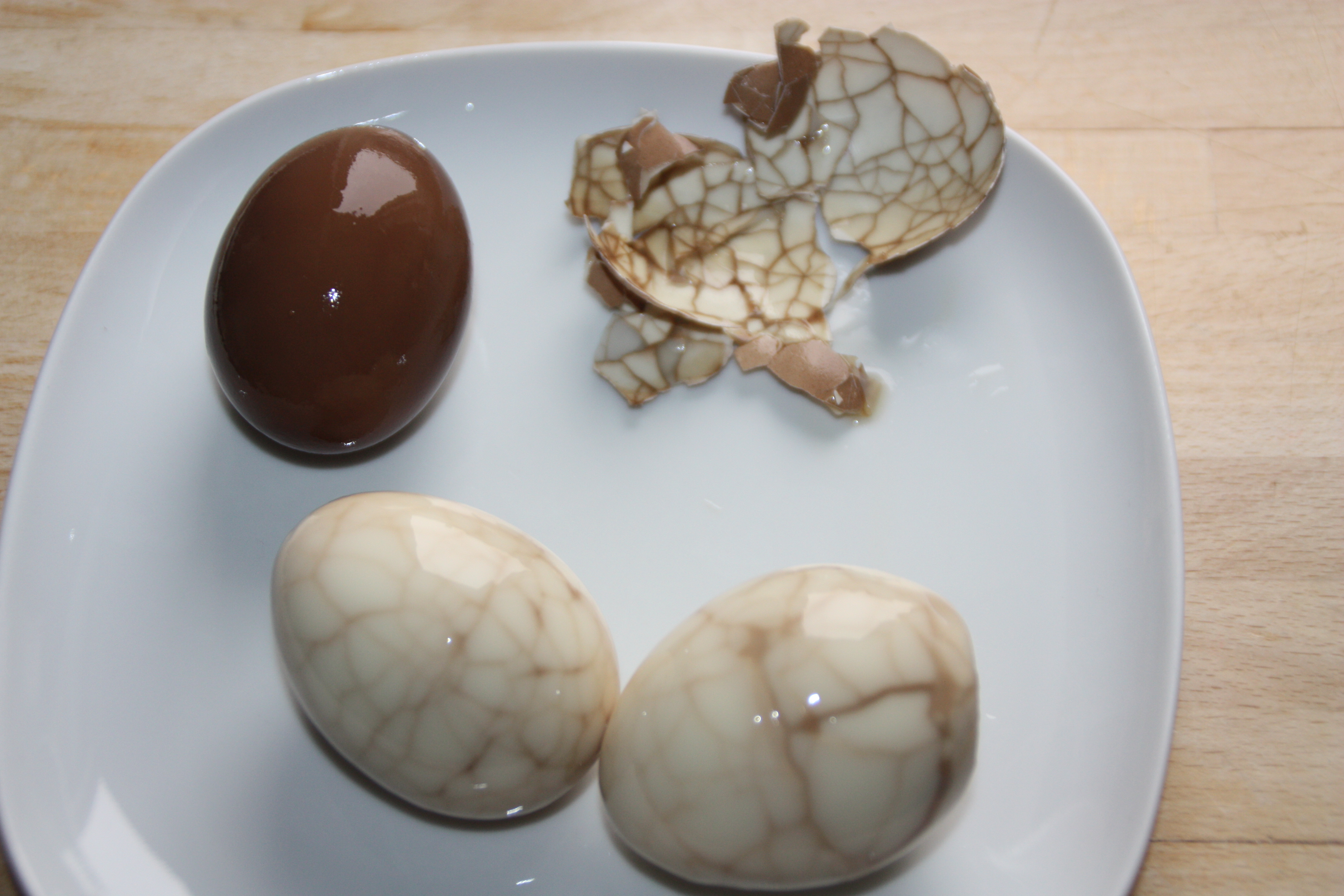
Tea eggs: unpeeled (bottom) and a peeled one with shell (top)

- Twenty-four flavors tea
- Canton love-pes vine tea / Canton abrus herb drink (Chinese: 雞骨草)
- Chrysanthemum tea (Chinese: 銀菊露/菊花茶)
- Dampness expelling tea (Chinese: 去濕荼)
- Five flowers tea (Chinese: 五花茶)
- Flu tea (Chinese: 感冒茶)
- Hemp seed tea (Chinese: 火麻仁)
- Self-heal spike tea (Chinese: 夏枯草)

=== Other drinks and snacks sold ===
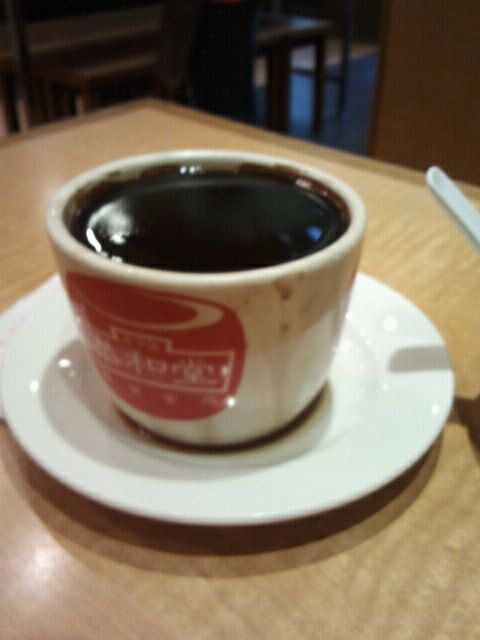
Tortoise jelly

- Plum soup
- Sugar cane and lalang grass rhizoma tea (Chinese: 竹蔗茅根水)
- Tea egg
- Tortoise jelly

== Notable shops ==
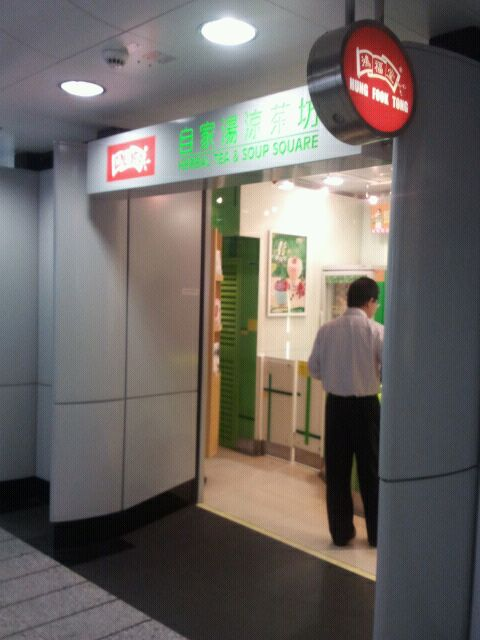
A modernized herbal tea shop called Hung Fook Tong

- Healthworks (Chinese: 健康工房)
- Hui Lau Shan Healthy Dessert (Chinese: 許留山)
- Hoi Tin Tong (Chinese: 海天堂)
- Hung Fook Tong (Chinese: 鴻福堂)
- Wong Lo Kat (Chinese: 王老吉)
- Yeung Wo Tong (Chinese: 養和堂)
- Kung Wo Tong (Chinese: 恭和堂)

== In popular culture ==
=== Television shows ===
==== TVB drama ====
- Steps (2007)
- Suspects in Love (2010)

=== Movies ===
- Young Dreams (Chinese: 涼茶‧馬尾‧飛機頭) (1982)
- Tricky Brains (1991)
- Echoes of the Rainbow (2010)
