= Egg drop soup =

Chinese soup

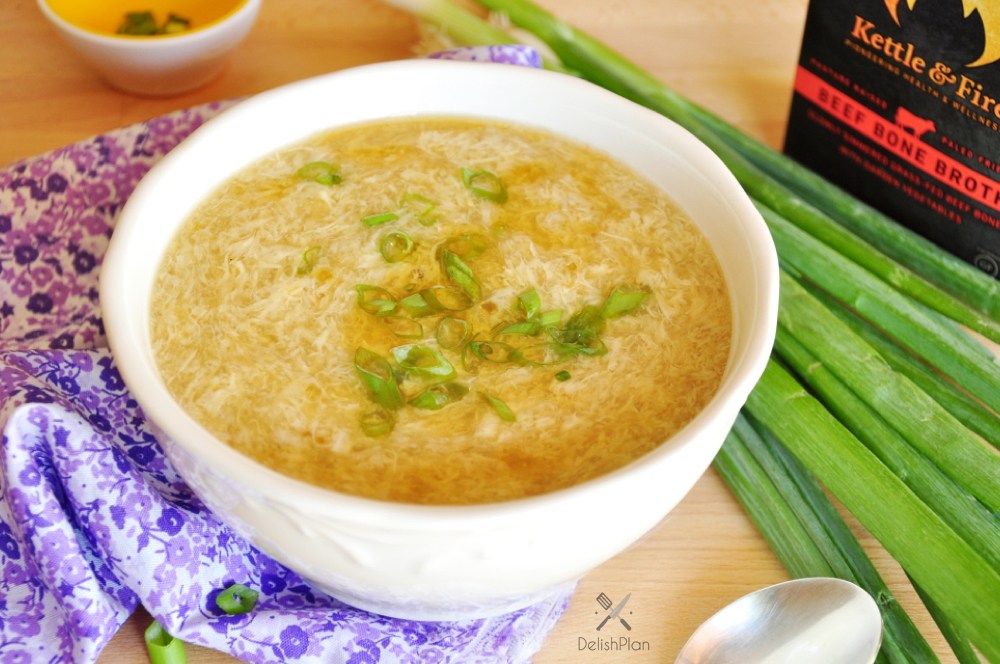
- Egg drop soup with scallions
- Type: Soup
- Place of origin: China
- Main ingredients: Eggs, chicken broth, condiments (black pepper or white pepper), scallions, tofu

Egg drop soup
- Traditional Chinese: 蛋花湯
- Literal meaning: egg flower soup
Transcriptions
Standard Mandarin
- Hanyu Pinyin: dànhuātāng
Yue: Cantonese
- Jyutping: daan2 faa1 tong1
Southern Min
- Hokkien POJ: tàn-hue-kenn, tàn-hue-kinn

Alternative Chinese name
- Traditional Chinese: 蛋花羹
Transcriptions
Standard Mandarin
- Hanyu Pinyin: dànhuāgēng
Yue: Cantonese
- Jyutping: daan2 faa1 gang1

Egg drop soup, also known as egg flower soup, (Chinese: 蛋花湯; pinyin: dànhuātāng) is a Chinese soup of wispy beaten eggs in chicken broth. Condiments such as black or white pepper, and finely chopped scallions and tofu, are commonly added to the soup. The soup is made by adding a thin stream of beaten eggs to the boiling broth in the final moments of cooking, creating thin, silken strands or flakes of cooked egg that float in the soup.

== Chinese cuisine ==
In Chinese cuisine, egg drop soups have a thinner consistency than most common Western variants. Depending on the region, they may be garnished with ingredients such as tofu, scallion, bean sprouts and corn.

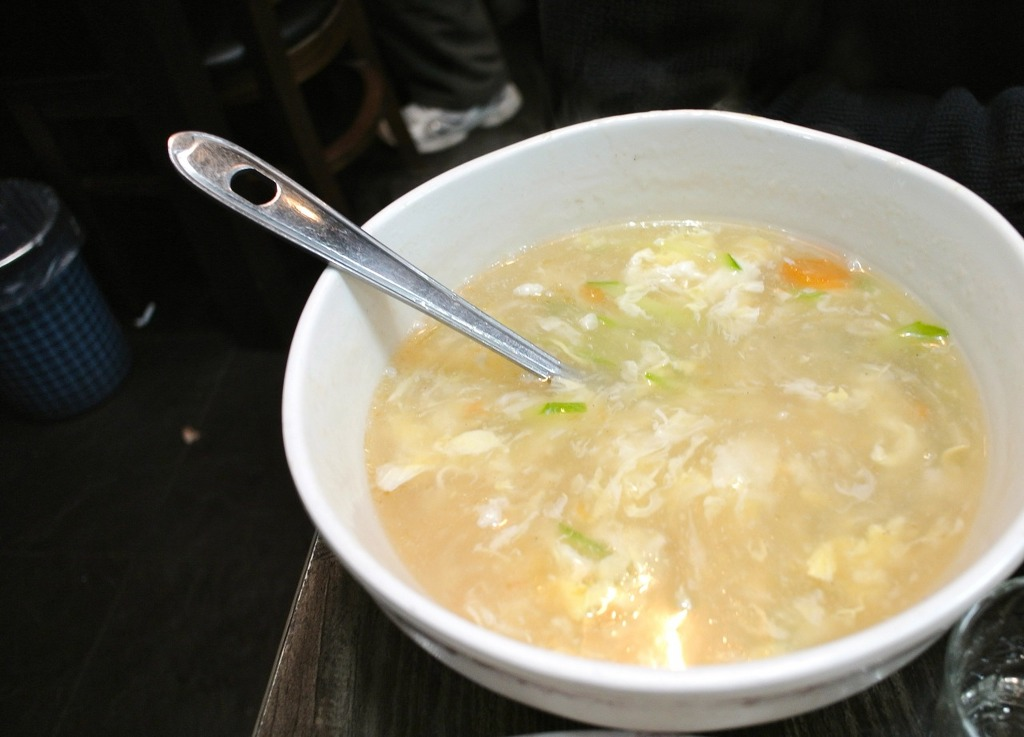

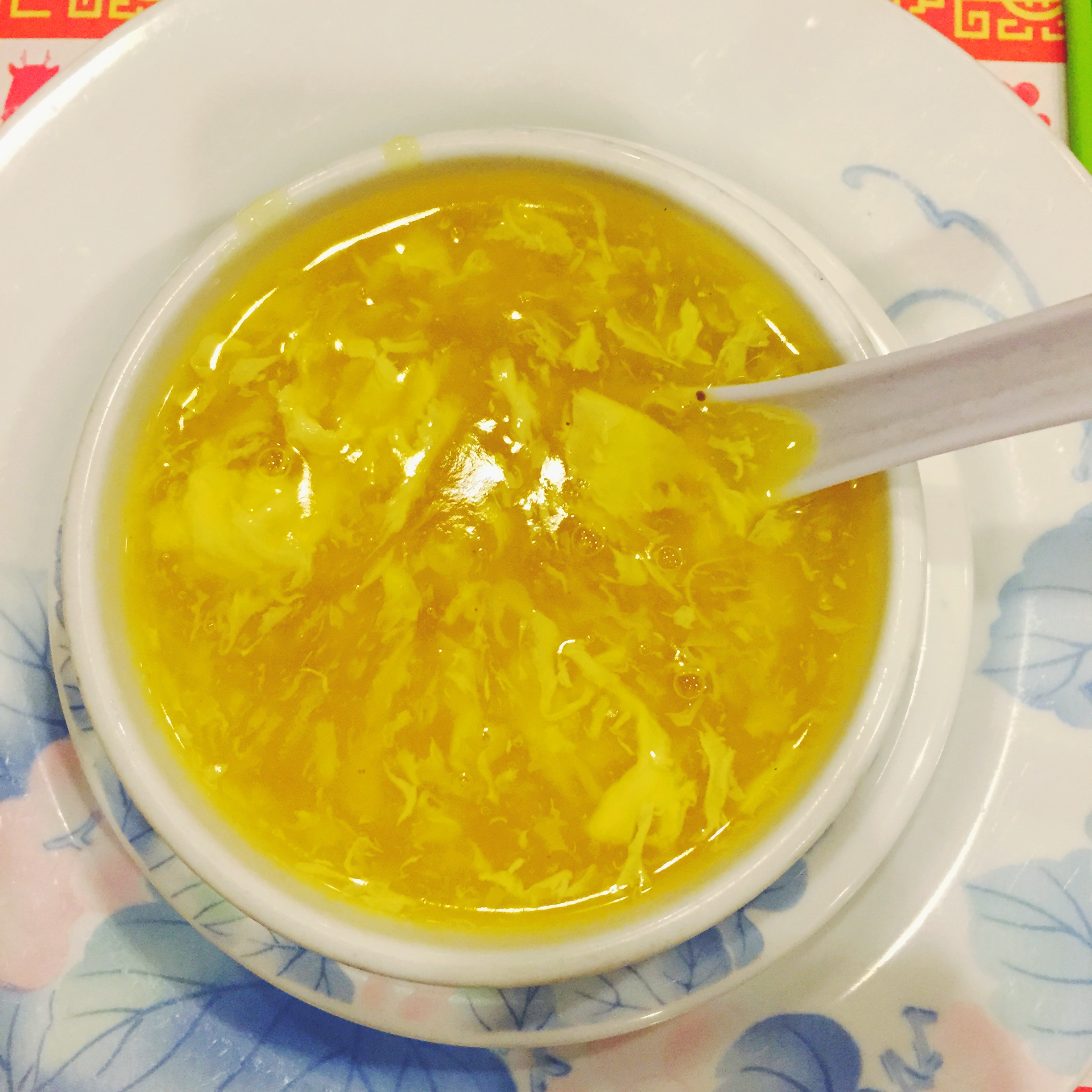

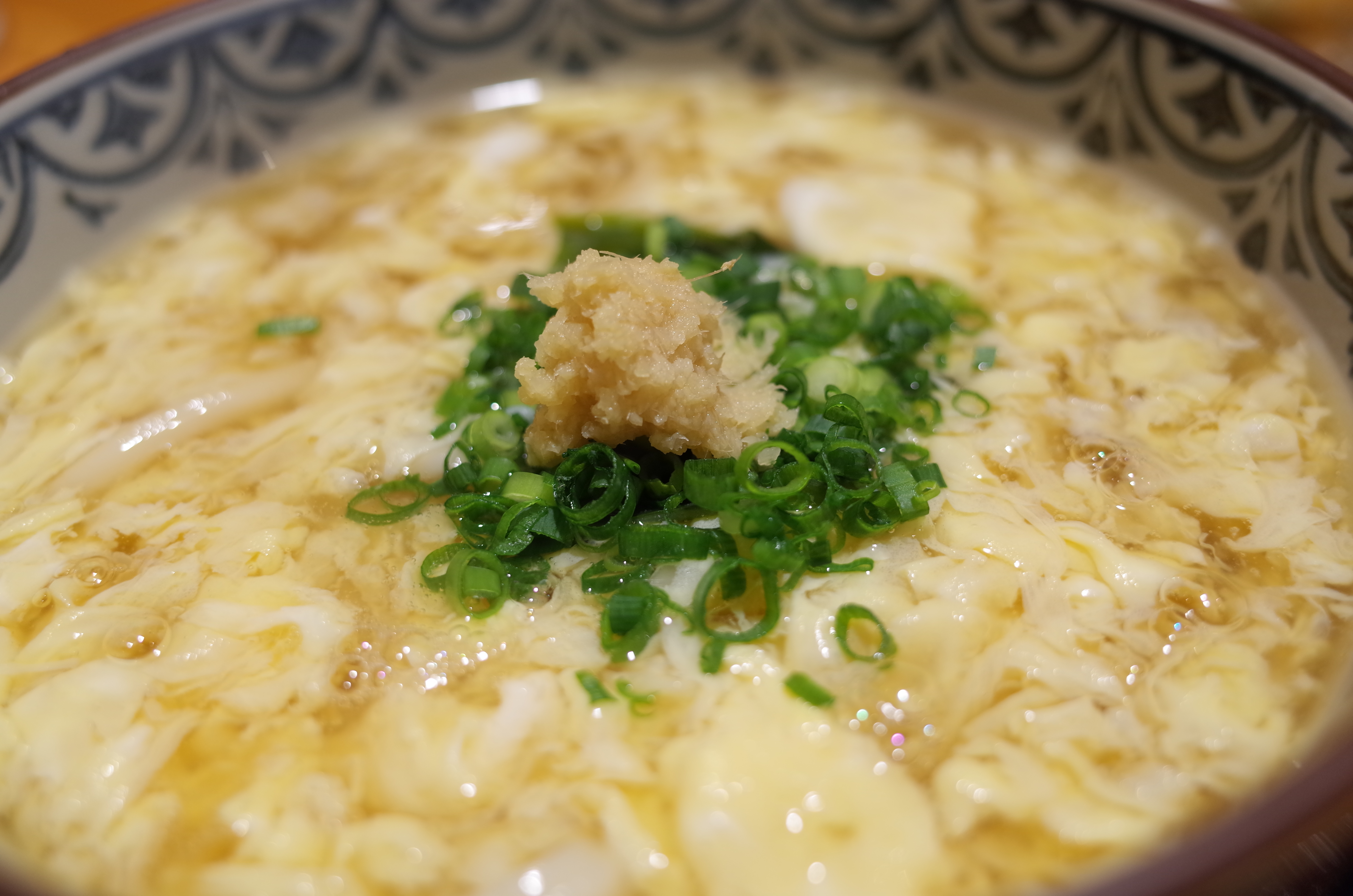

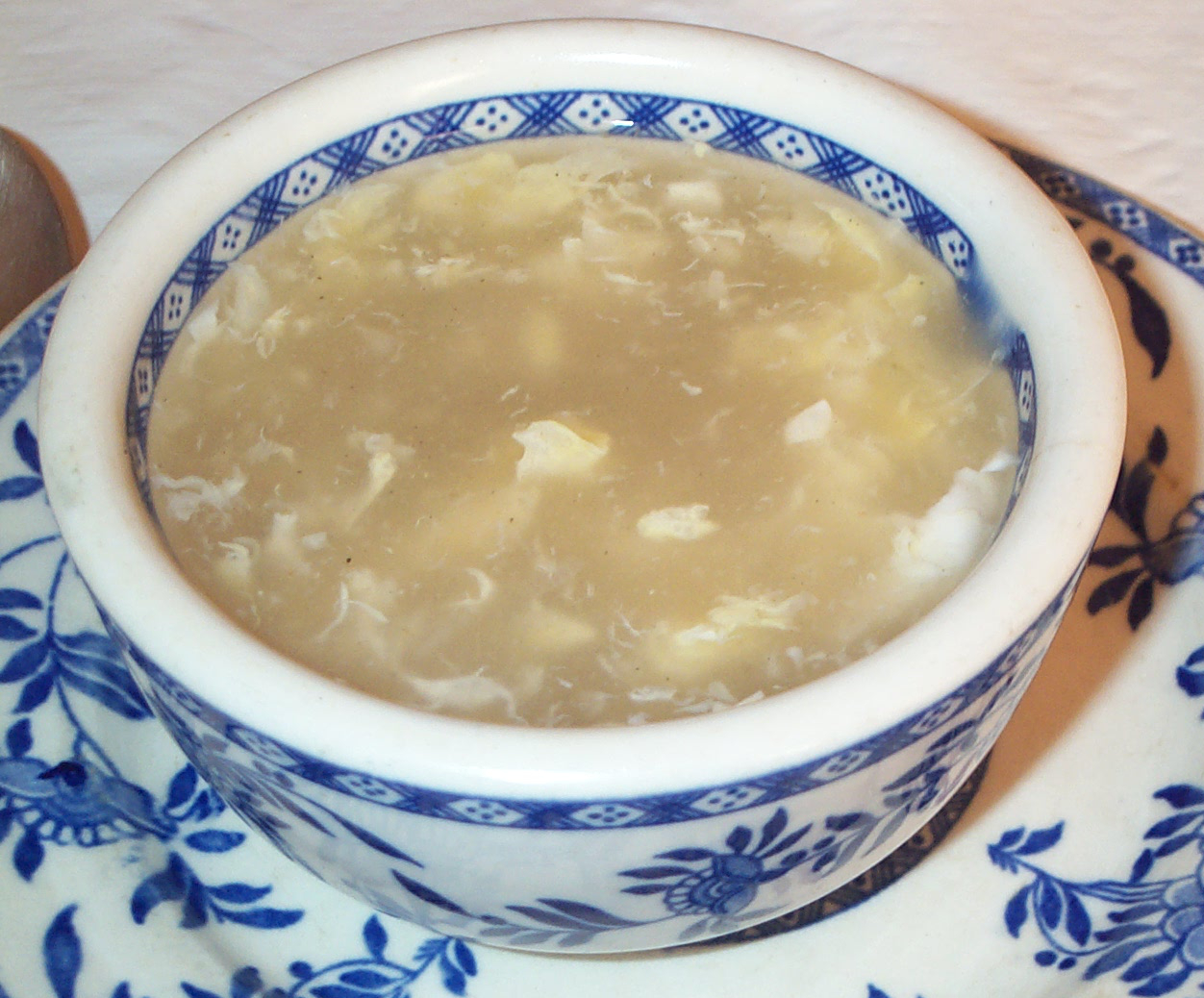

== American Chinese cuisine ==
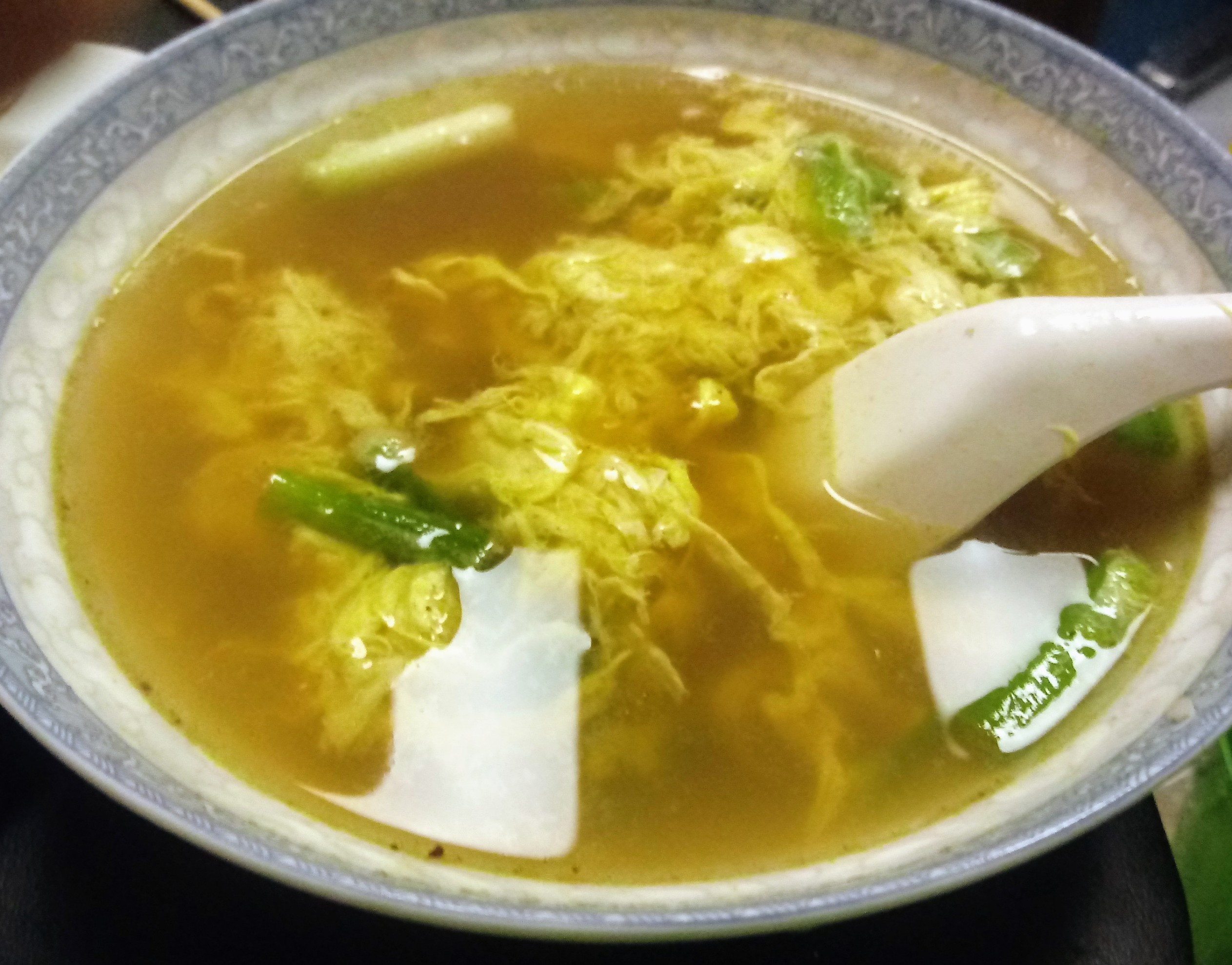
A bowl of egg drop soup in the United States

In the United States, egg drop soup is often one of the main soups offered in American Chinese cuisine, and is also called egg flower soup, a literal translation of its Chinese name, on the menus of some restaurants. Cornstarch may be used to thicken it.

== Laotian cuisine ==
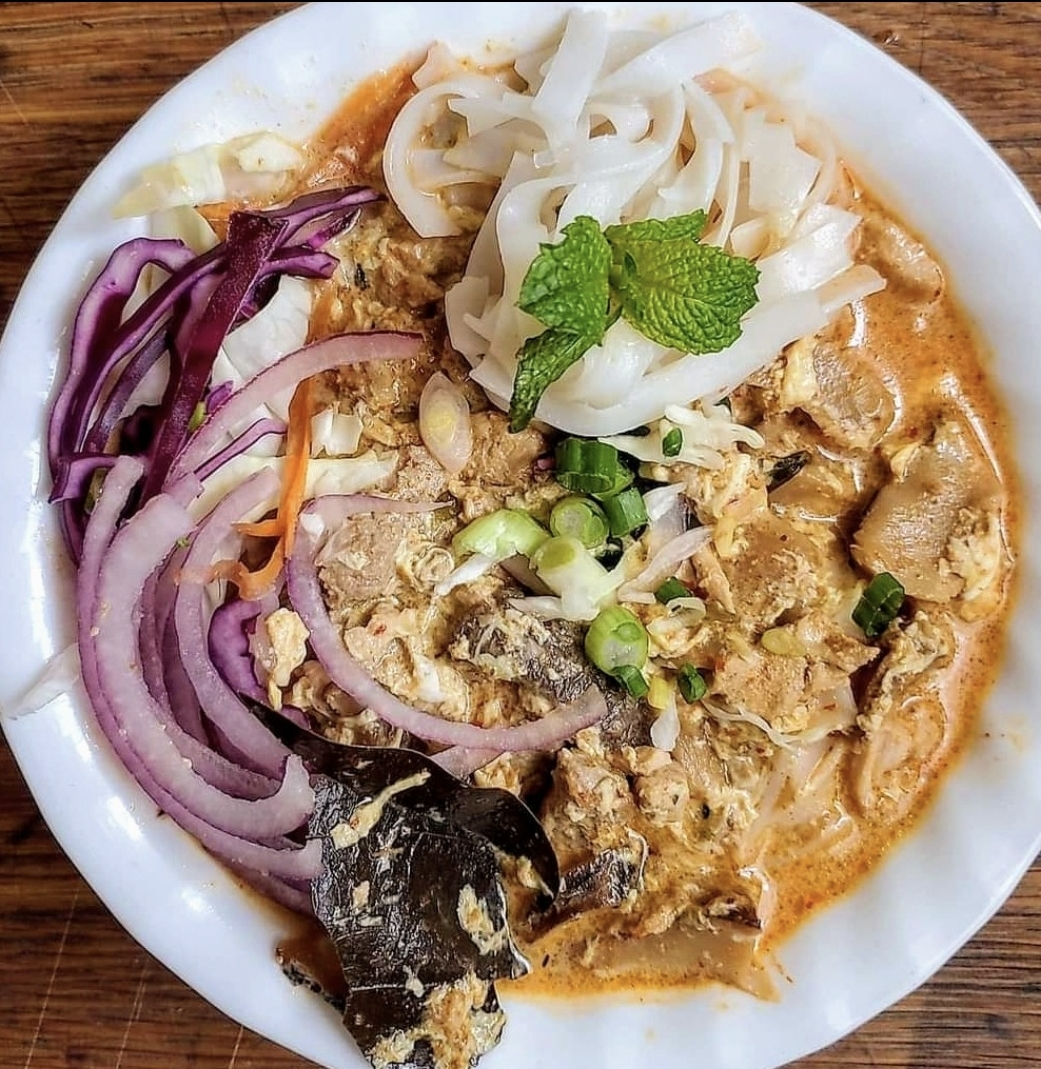
Mee ka tee

Mee ka tee is a Laotian red curry and coconut milk egg drop noodle soup.

== European cuisine ==
=== Italy ===
In Italy, stracciatella, a version made with egg and parmesan cheese, is popular, as is zuppa pavese, consisting of broth into which slices of stale bread and poached eggs are placed.

=== France ===
In France, tourin, a garlic soup, is made with egg whites which are drizzled into the soup in a similar way to how traditional egg drop soup is made.

=== Spain ===
In Spain, the similar and traditional sopa de ajo ("garlic soup") uses egg whites to thicken the broth in a similar way.

=== Austria & Hungary ===
In Austria, egg drop soup (Eierflockensuppe or Eierflöckchensuppe) is a simple, traditional recipe generally made for very young children or sick people. Scrambled eggs are mixed with flour and then poured into boiling soup in order to make small egg dumplings. Spices can be added to the egg-flour mixture according to taste.

=== Poland ===
There is a similar recipe in Polish cuisine (kluski lane, lit. 'poured noodles'), with the egg-flour mixture either poured directly into soup, or into boiling water, then strained and added to a soup or sauce. For children, often simmering milk (optionally with sugar) is used in place of soup.

=== Russia ===
In Russia, semolina is usually boiled in the chicken stock before the eggs are whisked in for a more substantial result, and flavored with chopped scallion and black pepper. Simple egg dough dumplings similar to lazy vareniki (варе́ники) or the Ukrainian halušky (галушка) are a frequent addition in the southern regions.

=== Cyprus and Greece ===
In Cyprus and Greece, the egg is beaten and then slowly stirred in the soup so it does not curdle. Lemon and rice are the additional ingredients besides the chicken stock to make avgolemono (αβγολέμονο).

== See also ==
- Egg tong sui
- List of Chinese soups
