= Tong sui =

Cantonese dish

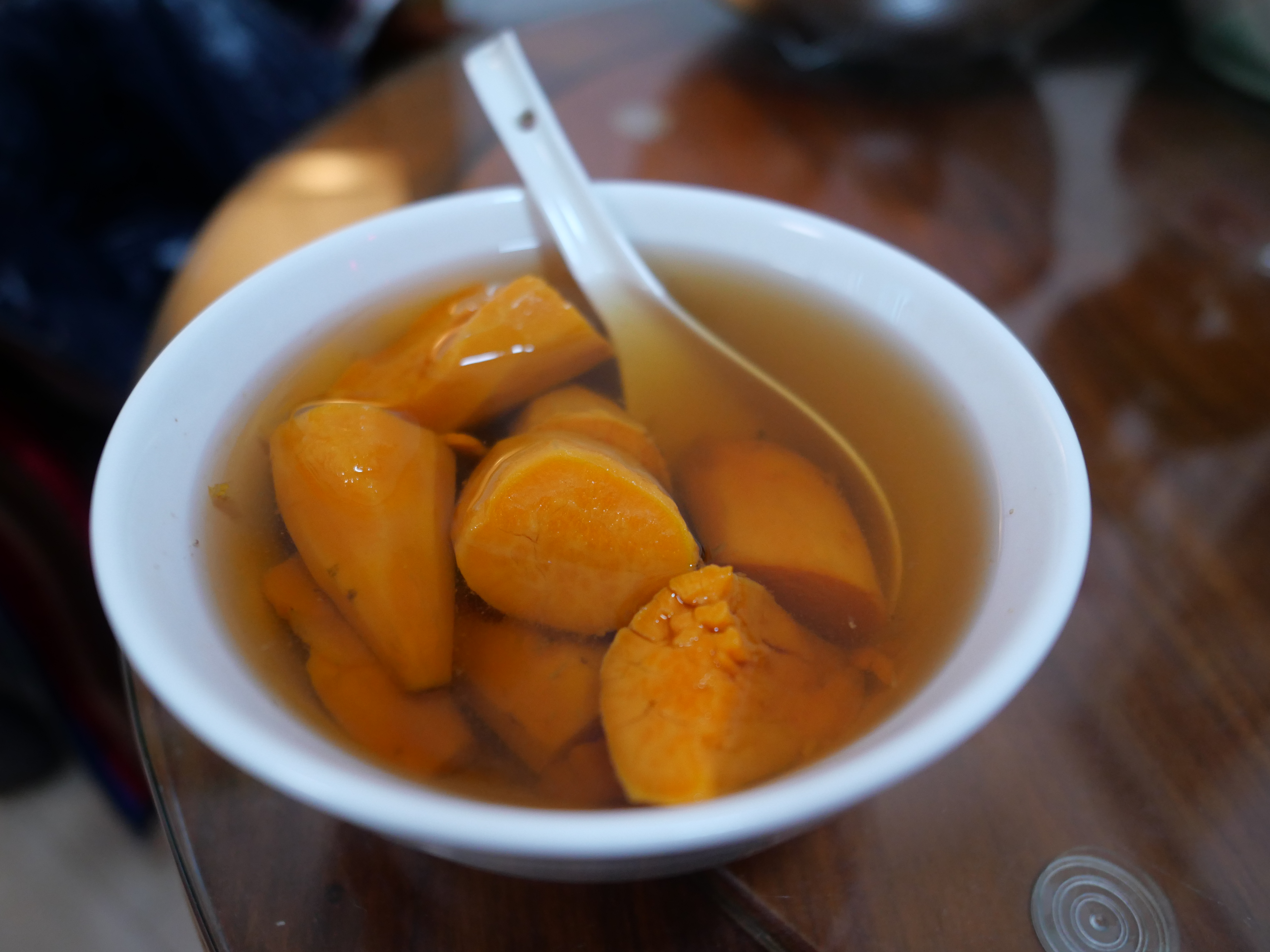
- Sweet potato tong sui
- Type: Soup or custard
- Course: Dessert
- Place of origin: China

Tong sui
- Chinese: 糖水
- Literal meaning: sugar water
Transcriptions
Standard Mandarin
- Hanyu Pinyin: táng shuǐ
Yue: Cantonese
- Jyutping: tong^{4} seoi^{2}
Southern Min
- Hokkien POJ: thn̂g-tsuí

Tian tang
- Chinese: 甜湯
- Literal meaning: sweet soup
Transcriptions
Standard Mandarin
- Hanyu Pinyin: tián tāng
Yue: Cantonese
- Jyutping: tim^{4} tong^{1}
Southern Min
- Hokkien POJ: tiⁿ-thng

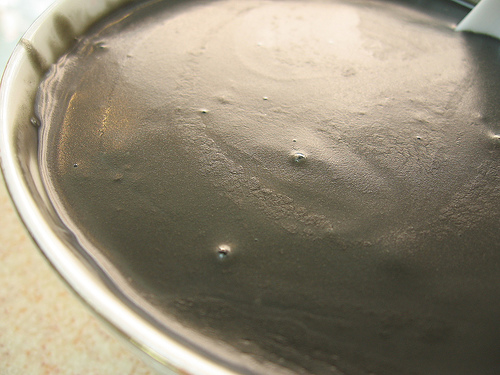
Black sesame soup

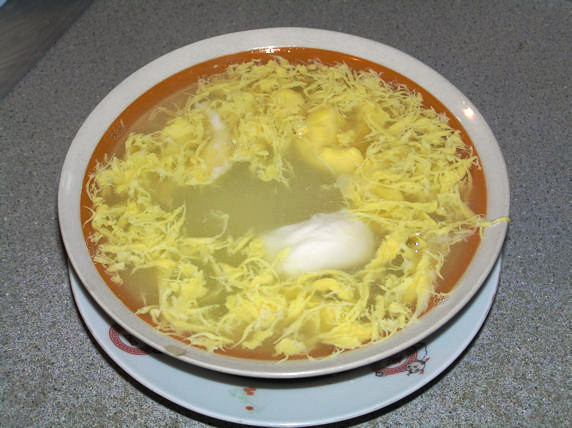
Egg tong sui

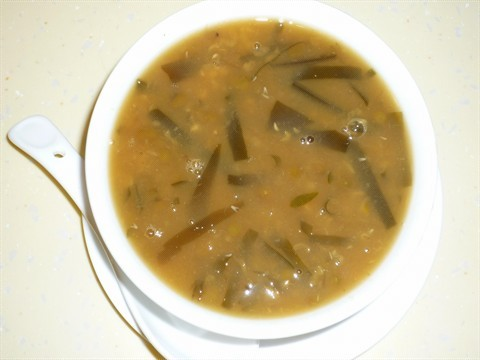
Mung bean soup with extra kelp

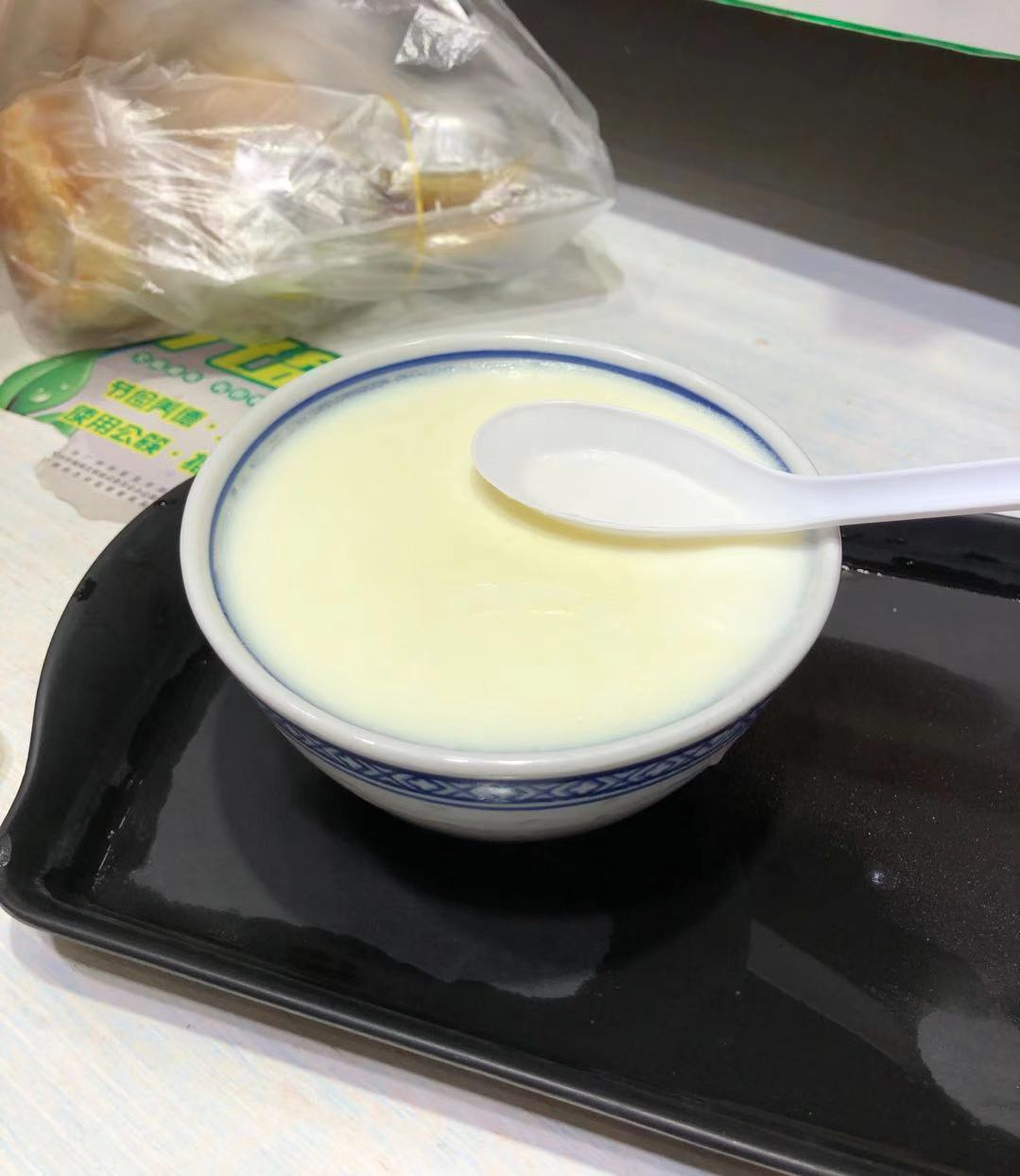
Double skin milk

Tong sui (Chinese: 糖水; lit. 'sugar water') or tim tong is a general term for any sweet soup served as a dessert typically at the end of a meal in Chinese cuisine. Tong sui originated in the Lingnan region of China, including Guangdong, Guangxi, Hainan, Hong Kong, Macau, and some parts of other provinces in China. Therefore, in the narrow sense, the term tong sui is used to refer to soupy desserts from Lingnan, while occasionally it is also used in the broad sense, referring to any soupy dessert in Chinese-speaking regions.

A large variety of tong sui can be found in specialty stores dedicated to these desserts, called tong sui stores. Today, they have gained prominence in other parts of China and overseas. People can find tong sui stores in various parts of Canada, Australia, and the United States, showcasing the global appeal of these treats.

== History ==
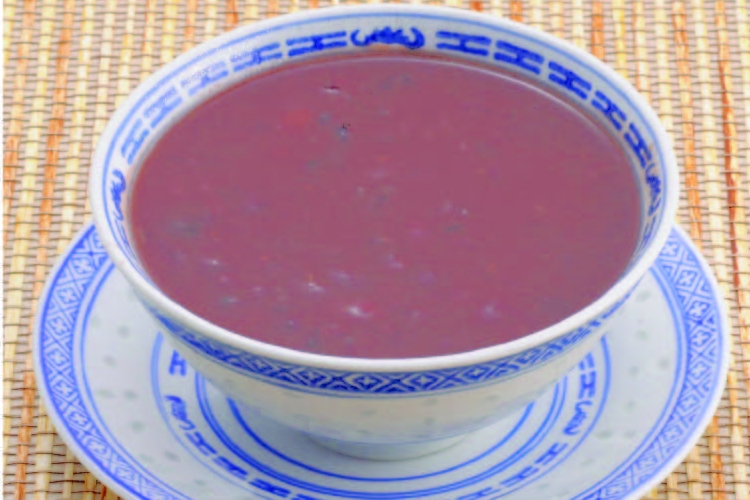
Assorted bean tong sui

The origin of Tong sui is hard to track, and its development in different regions also varied.

One main theory is that the climate in Lingnan is hot and humid, and, in accordance with Traditional Chinese Medicine, it is thought that this weather makes people catch dampness and internal heat, and sugar has the effect of clearing dampness and internal heat. Also, the Pearl River Delta region is a subtropical area with abundant sugarcane resources, so people in these areas have a history of "boiling sugar water" for health benefits.

In Guangzhou, Guangdong, there were Tong sui stores in the early 20th century. Most of them sold black sesame soup, mung bean soup, almond soup, and sweet potato soup at first. As the price of the products was low, it gained popularity among the people, and the industry developed well. Later, in the 1930s, dairy-based tong sui, such as steamed milk curd and ginger milk curd, appeared on the market and were fashionable.

Tong sui shops in Hong Kong mainly originated from the postwar period. Chinese migrants brought their hometown sweet soups to Hong Kong, such as red bean soup from Guangzhou and tang yuan from Shanghai. Newcomers sold tong sui in newly opened street side food stalls and Chinese tea houses. During the 1980s to 1990s, Hong Kong's economy developed rapidly and living standards rose. Western desserts and sweet soups were imported to Hong Kong by Western hotels or cooks who had studied in the West. Under Western influence, people started using fresh fruits to create new-style tong sui such as tapioca pudding. Many Chinese herbal tea shops like Hui Lau Shan transformed into tong sui shops. In the 21st century, chain tong sui shops have become more prominent and recommended as tourist attractions by The Hong Kong Tourism Board.

== Traditional tong sui ==
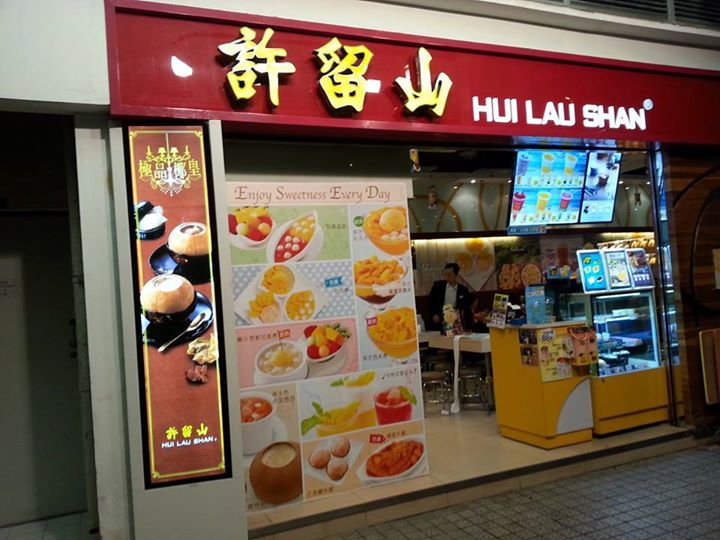
One of the chain tong sui shops (Hui Lau Shan) in Hong Kong, 2014

Historically, the basic ingredients of traditional sweet soups are beans, milk, and fruits. The desserts and sweet soups provided in the menus of the traditional tong sui shops are mainly the Chinese-style sweet soups. Staples like red bean soup and sweet almond soup are common types of sweet soups sold in the ordinary tong sui shops.

== Common varieties ==
English name	Chinese name	Description
Black sesame soup	芝麻糊; zi1 maa4 wu4*2	Ground black sesame seeds are traditionally cooked with water and rock sugar. Chinese herbs are sometimes added to enhance the flavor and aroma. The instant black sesame powder sold in Asian supermarkets is usually sweetened. It requires the addition of hot water and mixing in the serving bowl, after which it should be left for 15 minutes before serving.
Egg tong sui	鸡蛋糖水; 雞蛋糖水; gai1 daan2 tong4 seoi2	popular in Hong Kong and southern China.
Got fan soup	葛粉汤; 葛粉湯; got3 fan2 tong1	kudzu soup.
Hasma	雪蛤; syut3 gaap3	A dessert made of dried frog fallopian tubes with supposed health benefits.
Purple rice porridge	紫米露; zi2 mai5 lou6	A dessert made of thick boiled black rice mixed with coconut juice. Sago, red beans, and taro are often added on top.
Red bean soup	红豆汤; 紅豆湯; hóngdòu tāng or 红豆沙; 紅豆沙; hung4 dau2 saa1	Cooked and served exactly like mung bean soup & paste. Red bean soup is normally pre-boiled to soften the skin by leaving it in hot water for one hour. Then cook in water for 20–30 minutes until the beans rupture. Sugar or rock sugar is then added and cooked for another 20–30 minutes until the bean texture becomes sandy. As for red bean paste, the skin is removed before cooking. Chinese herbs may be added to enhance the flavor and taste.
Sai mai lo or Sago	西米露; sai1 mai5 lou6	A dessert soup of pearl tapioca, coconut and evaporated milk.
Mung bean soup	绿豆汤; 綠豆湯; lǜdòu tāng or 绿豆沙; 綠豆沙; luk6 dau6 saa1	Made from mung beans and cooked exactly like red bean soup/paste, sometimes also served with seaweed.
Six flavors soup	六味汤; 六味湯; liùwèi tāng	A sweet curative soup made for hot summer days, one of many "numbered" medicinal soups.
Peanut paste soup	花生糊; huāshēng hú	Like black sesame paste, peanut paste is a ground peanut powder cooked with syrup and water. Instant peanut paste powder sold in Asian supermarkets are usually sweetened roasted peanut powder or flour, that only requires hot water to be served.
Sweet potato soup	番薯糖水; faan1 syu4 tong4 seoi2	Peeled sweet potato, normally cut into smaller pieces cooked/ boiled with syrup and water.
Sweet almond soup	杏仁糊; hang6 jan4 wu4	Ground almond powder that is cooked with sugar and water. Instant almond powder sold in Asian supermarkets are usually sweetened raw almond flour or powder, requires minimal cooking with boiling water or to be served after mixing with hot water for 15 minutes.
Sweet walnut soup	核桃糊; hat6 tou4 wu4 or 合桃糊; hap6 tou4 wu4	Ground walnut powder that is cooked with sugar and water, sometimes milk. Similar to Sweet almond soup, instant walnut powder is sold in Asian supermarkets as well.
Tofu skin egg tong sui	腐竹鸡蛋糖水; 腐竹雞蛋糖水; fu6 zuk1 gai1 daan2 tong4 seoi2	Made of four ingredients: tofu skin, eggs, sugar and water. Soften the dry tofu skin by soaking it in water first, boil it with sugar and water, add boiled eggs before serving. Sometimes, boiled ginkgo nuts are added.
Chiu-chow style mung bean sweet soup	绿豆爽、绿豆蒜（台語：li̍k-tāu-suàn）、豆爽(tau suan)	It is originally from Chiu-chow (Chaozhou), but later spread to other regions such as Singapore, Taiwan, and Malaysia. Each region has its own variation. It is made of skinless mung beans, sugar and arrowroot starch or glutinous rice.
Sophora flower noodle soup	槐花粉糖水	Sophora flower noodle soup is a unique tong sui from Guangxi. The sophora flower noodle is made by filtering the rice pulp made from rice and sophora flower pulp through a funnel to form the noodle shape in the water. People add chilled sugar water to the sophora flower noodles to make it a tong sui.
Hainan style ching bo leung	清补凉 (Ching bo leung / Qing bu liang)	The name of the dessert means "refreshing, nourishing, cool", which speaks for itself. It is an iced dessert typically topped with mung bean, pearl barley, red jujube, seasonal fruits, syrup, ice, and sometimes milk.
Cha cha	喳咋	This is a dessert from Macau. It is said that the dessert was invented by Portuguese soldiers stationed in Macau who used to cook various kinds of beans in a pot of sugar water for lunch. The dish was initially made of various kinds of beans, such as red beans, green beans, eyebrow beans, red kidney beans, triangle beans, etc. Later on, taro and sago were also added.
Mango pomelo sago	杨枝甘露	A dessert from Hong Kong made of diced mango, sliced pomelo, sago, coconut milk, evaporated milk and milk. This dessert was said to be invented by Lei Garden, a famous Cantonese restaurant in Hong Kong.

=== Related desserts ===
English name	Chinese name	Description
Doufuhua	豆花; dòuhuā or 豆腐花; dau6 fu6 faa1	Tofu pudding, add a small amount of salt or gypsum condensed into soy milk to form a more tender semi-liquid tofu with sweet syrup served in a separate bowl.
Guilinggao	龜苓膏; gwai1 ling4 gou1	made from three-lined box turtle.
Steamed egg custard	炖蛋; 燉蛋; dan6 daan2	
Steamed milk custard	炖奶; 燉奶; dan6 naai5	
Double skin milk	双皮奶; 雙皮奶; soeng1 pei4 naai5	

== See also ==
- Cantonese desserts
- Chè
- Compote
- Fruit cocktail
- Kissel
- Kompot
- List of Chinese desserts
- List of Chinese soups
- List of soups
- Ching bo leung
- Tangyuan (food)
