= Hui Lau Shan =

Desert shop chain from Hong Kong

Hui Lau Shan 許留山

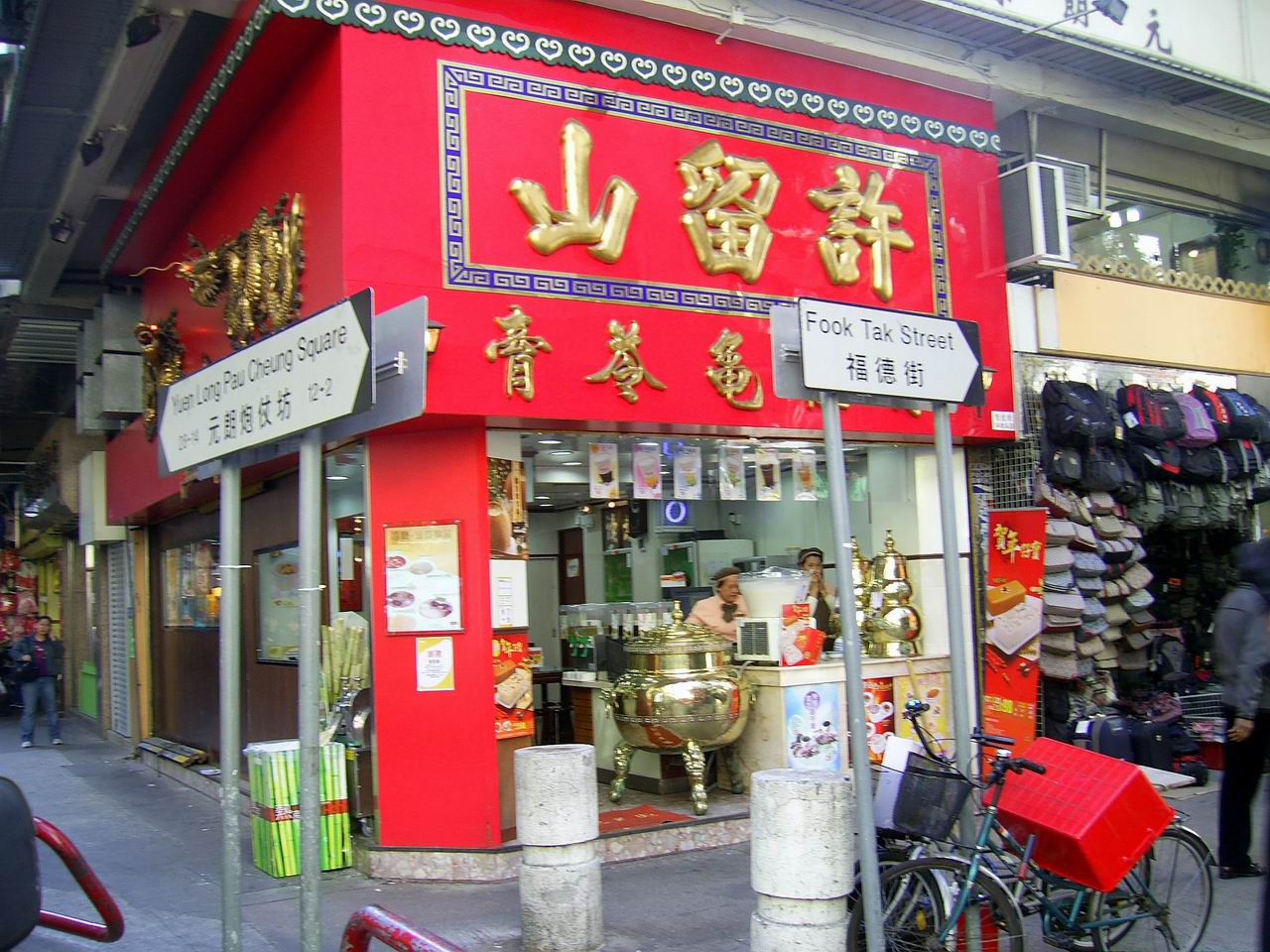
- The chain's first shop at Yuen Long

Restaurant information
- Established: 1960; 66 years ago
- Closed: November 2021 (Hong Kong stores)
- Owner: Royal Dynasty International Holding Company
- Food type: Desserts: tong sui, nuomici, snacks
- Location: Hong Kong; Macau; China; Malaysia; South Korea; Canada; United Kingdom
- Website: www.hkhls.com

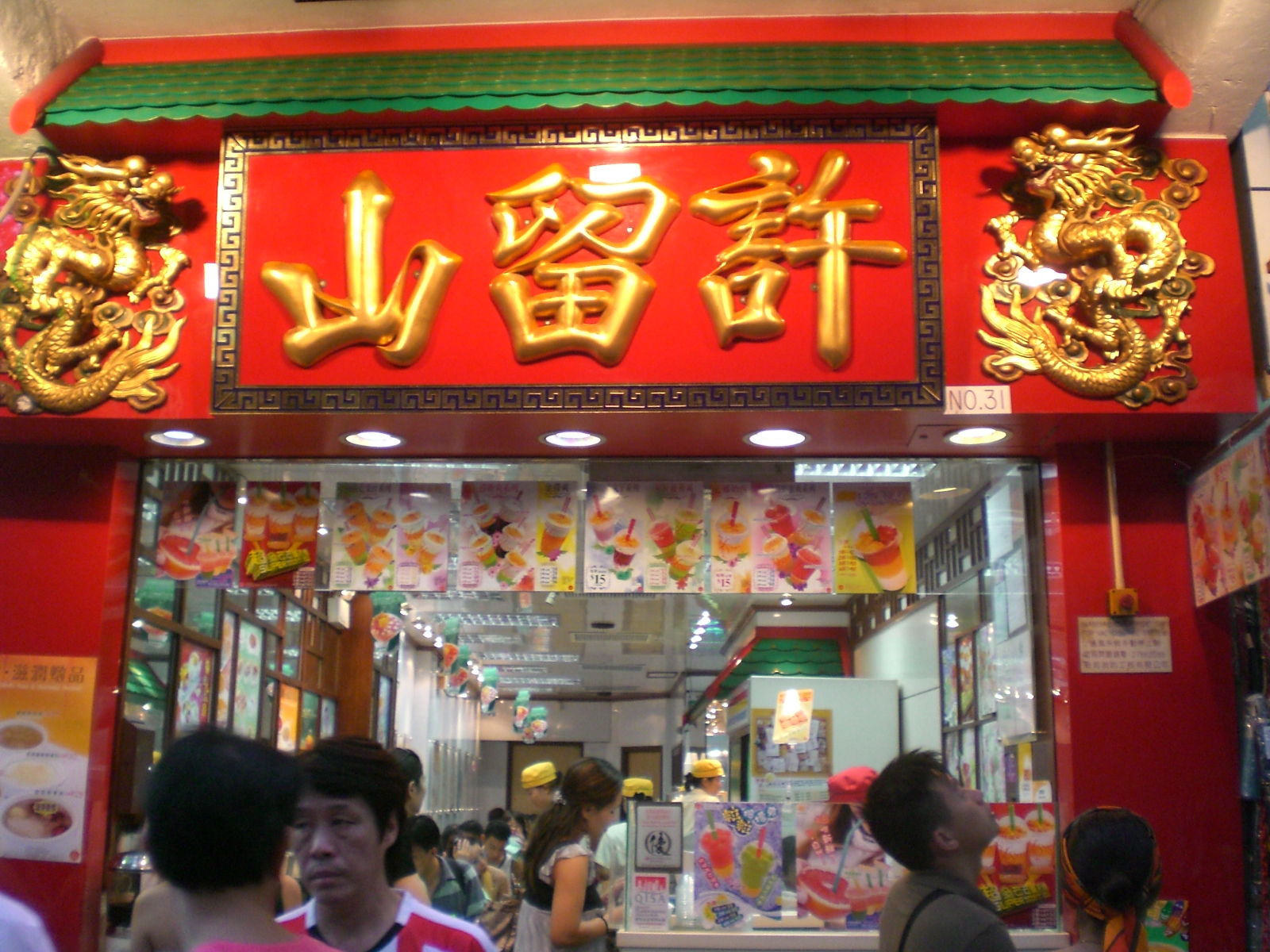
A Hui Lau Shan shop in Tsim Sha Tsui

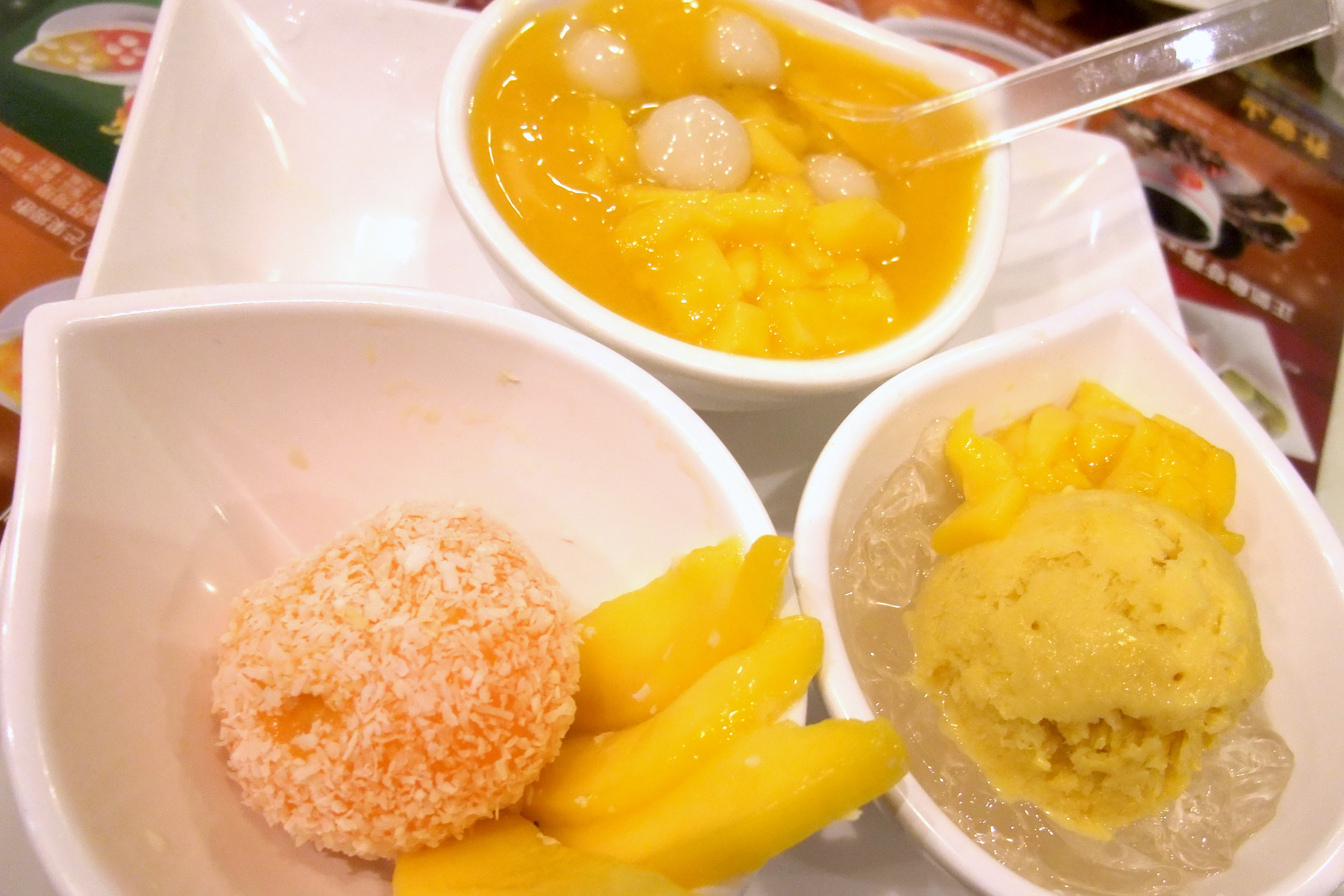
A mango platter including nuomici.

Hui Lau Shan (Chinese: 許留山; Jyutping: heoi2 lau4 saan1; pinyin: Xǔliú Shān) is a chain of dessert shops based in Hong Kong. Founded in the 1960s as a herbal tea outlet, the chain evolved into a restaurant chain specializing in sweets, snacks and dessert soups called tong sui. Since the introduction of mango pomelo sago in the early 1990s, Hui Lau Shan has additionally been known for its mango-themed desserts.

The chain was acquired by Royal Dynasty International Holding Company, a mainland Chinese catering chain in 2015 for 524 million RMB. Its Hong Kong business was filed for winding-up in 2020, with Hui Lau Shan citing declined customers attributed to the 2019–20 Hong Kong protests. A settlement was subsequently reached whereby the winding-up petition was withdrawn in July 2020.

== History ==
Hui Lau Shan was founded by Hui Chi-Yuk in the 1960s. The chain's first shop opened in Yuen Long, New Territories, and started as an herbal outlet selling turtle jelly (龜苓膏) and herbal teas (涼茶). In the 1980s, Hui Lau Shan diversified its business and began to sell desserts and snacks like turnip cake and coconut milk. The practice of using of fresh fruits in desserts emerge in the 1990s, when third generation of Hui Lau Shan created the "Mango Sago". Every year, Hui Lau Shan used up to a thousand tonnes of carabao mangoes in their dessert making process. Since the 1990s, the chain has expanded, with over 260 outlets in China, Malaysia, the United States and South Korea.

In July 2007, the third-generation owner of Hui Lau Shan sold the Hong Kong franchise to the Malaysian firm Navis Capital Partners. Owing to disputes by the new Malaysian shareholder over an existing franchising agreement signed between Hui Lau Shan Hong Kong and Hui Lau Shan Guangzhou, the latter was forced to change its brand name to "Tang Lau Shan" (Chinese: 鄧留山). The franchise was subsequently acquired by Royal Dynasty International Holding Company for 524 million RMB in 2015.
