= Sweet potato soup =

Chinese sweet dessert soup

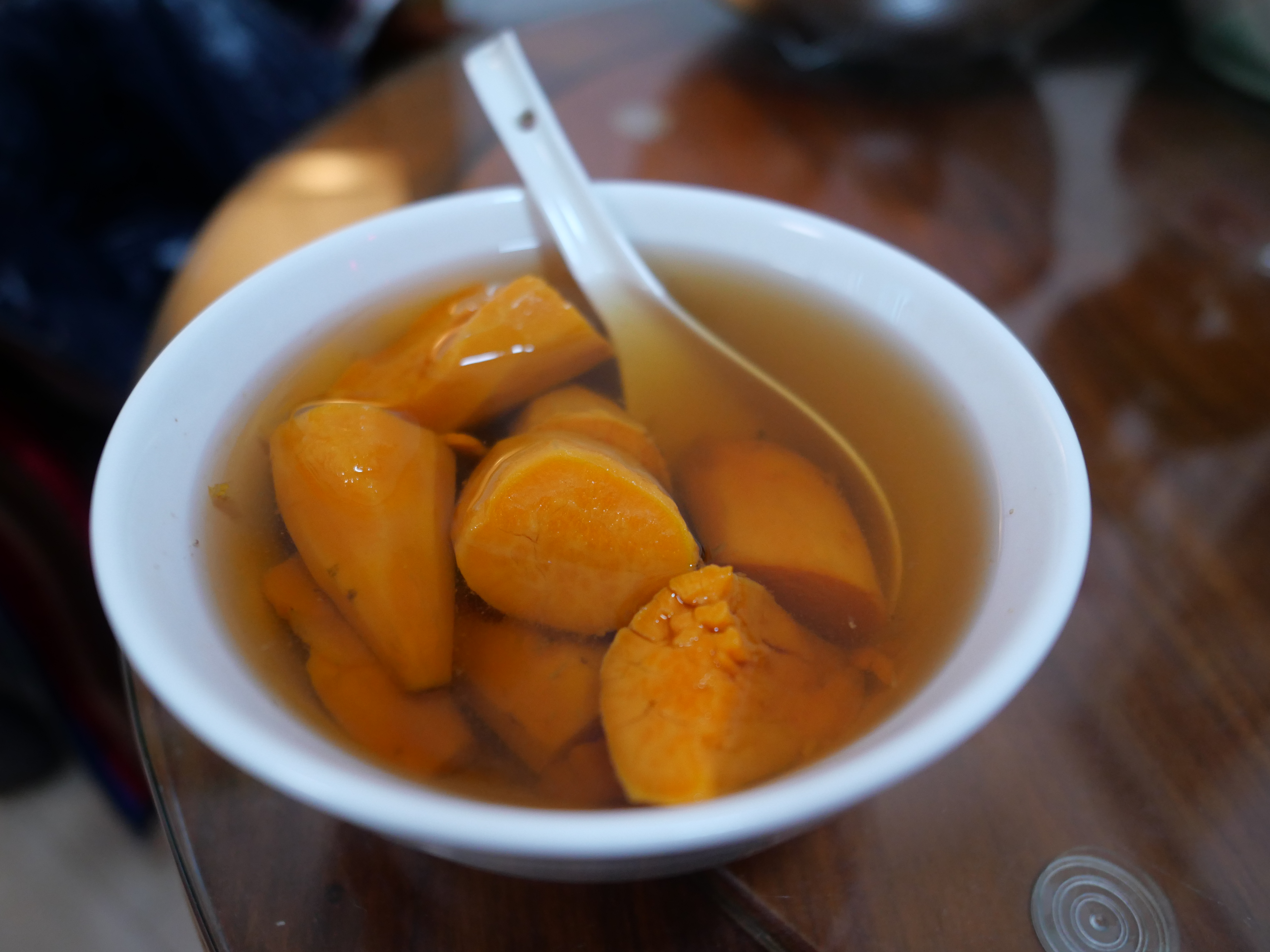
- Type: Tong sui
- Place of origin: China
- Main ingredients: Sweet potatoes, brown sugar, ginger

Sweet potato soup
- Chinese: 番薯糖水
- Literal meaning: sweet potato sweet water
Transcriptions
Standard Mandarin
- Hanyu Pinyin: fan1 shu3 tang2 shui3
Yue: Cantonese
- Jyutping: faan1 syu4*2 tong4 seoi2

Sweet potato soup is a Chinese dessert from Southern China, and is especially popular in its Cantonese region.

== Cantonese cuisine ==
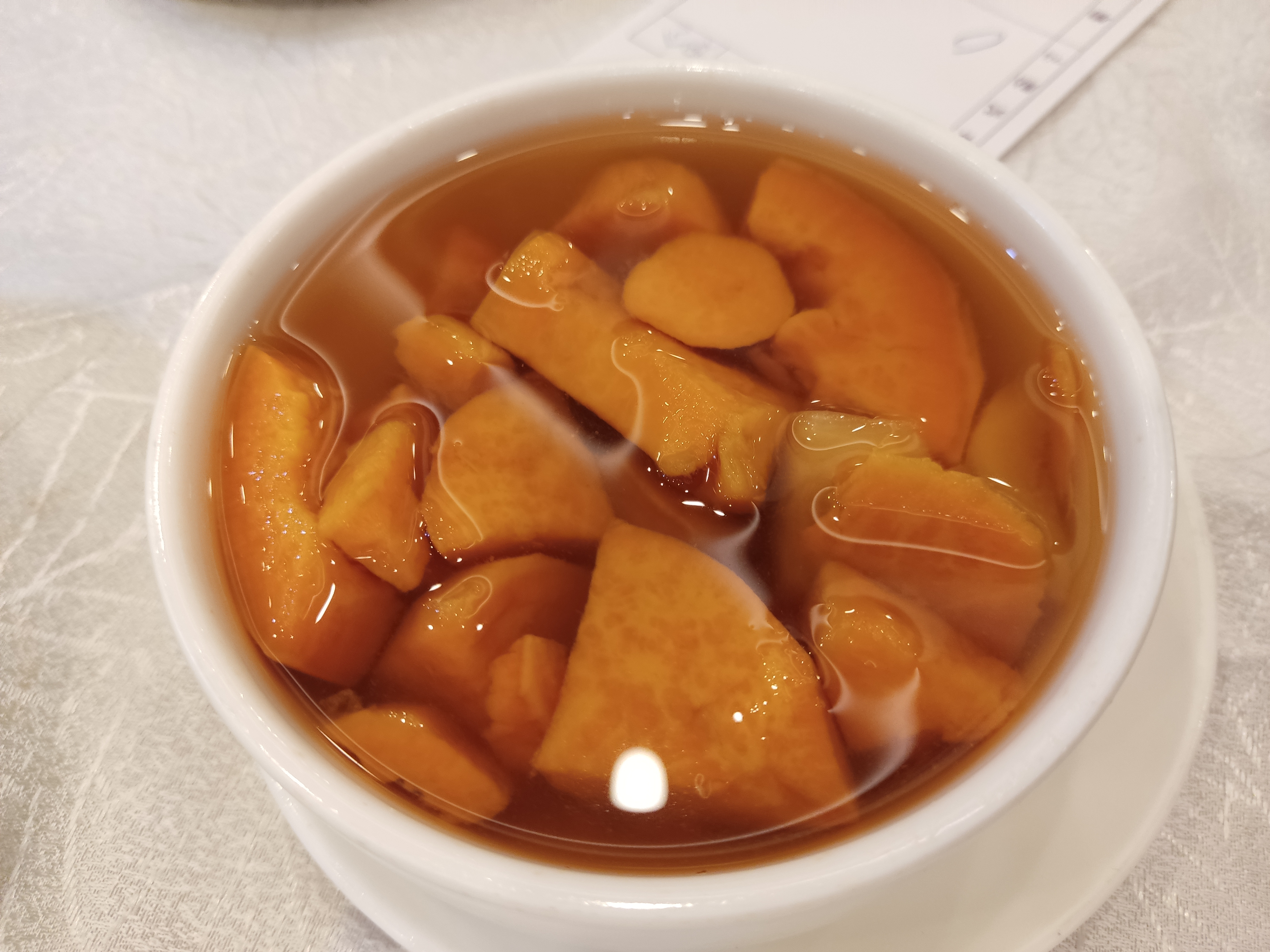

In Cantonese cuisine, it is categorized as a tong sui or sweet soup, hence the Chinese name. The soup is usually thin in texture, but potent in taste. The recipe is simple, consisting of boiling the sweet potato for a long time with brown sugar and ginger. Sweet potato is one of the most commonly found and abundant vegetables grown in China. With its simple recipe and large crop supply, sweet potato soup is one of the most accessible and affordable tong sui in the region.

== See also ==
- Egg tongsui
- Fried sweet potato
- List of Chinese soups
- List of sweet potato dishes
- List of soups
- Sweet potato pie
