= Hoi Tin Tong =

Hong Kong chain of herbal product stores

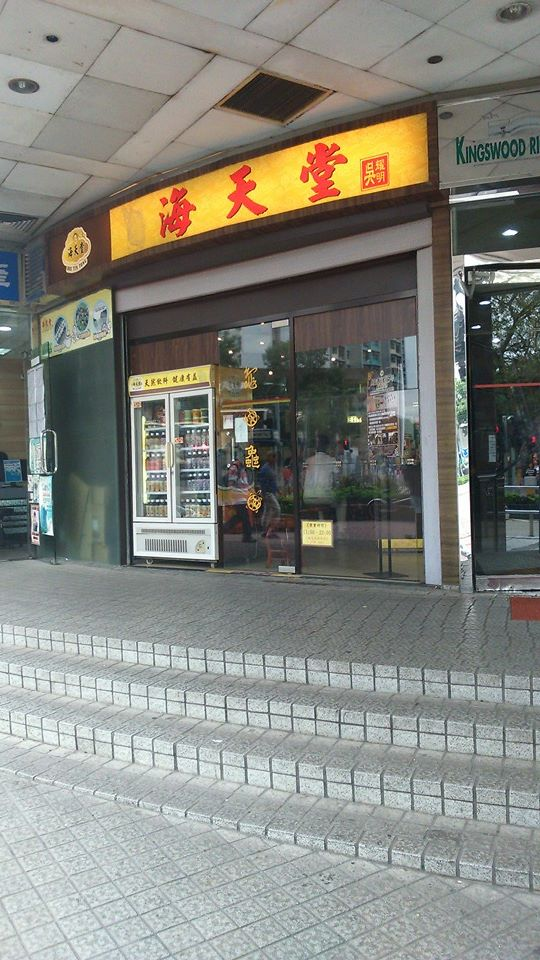
Every Hoi Tin Tong Store has a reddish and yellowish signboard with their Chinese brand name "海天堂" on it.

Hoi Tin Tong (Jyutping: hoi2 tin1 tong4) is a chain of herbal products stores in Hong Kong. The traditional Chinese turtle jelly is their first herbal product. Today, Hoi Tin Tong has developed a wider range of products such as Chinese Herbal Gummy Series and Herbal Drink Series. Hoi Tin Tong markets their natural products as aids to fulfill customers’ health needs. The founder of Hoi Tin Tong, Mr. Ng Yiu-ming, believes that Chinese herbs can strengthen human bodies and the immune system.

== History ==
The founder, Mr. Ng Yiu-ming, established the first store of Hoi Tin Tong in 1990 on Bowring Street in Jordon. Before setting up the first store, Ng had studied traditional Chinese medicine and herbs, then started the business, "Hoi Tin Ye Mei”, which sold wild animals and turtles. As time passed by, Ng became more experienced in this aspect and began to develop other products like Chinese Herbal Series, Cooking Sauce Series, and Chinese Herbal Gummy Series that can be found nowadays.

The idea of selling herbal turtle jelly came from Ng's mother who once weighed less than 100 pounds due to her sickness. However, her health improved gradually after taking herbal turtle gelatin for a period of time. Her appetite and diet returned to normal. She also gained back her weight to around 150 pounds.

After hearing Ng's mother's story, people wanted to try herbal turtle jelly for curing other diseases and preventing themselves from illnesses. In order to meet the demand of the herbal turtle jelly, the first store of Hoi Tin Tong was established. As only the natural and fresh ingredients could be used in herbal turtle jelly, thus the price was HK$50 a bowl. Customers eventually found its worthiness and returned to the shop for more with their friends.

Since then, Ng has opened a chain of retail stores in Hong Kong, Kowloon, New Territories, Macau and Mainland China to produce and invent a variety of new products. The market has further expanded to Taiwan and North America as well.

== Characteristics ==
Herbal jelly is the signature product of Hoi Tin Tong. Hoi Tin Tong puts an emphasis on the use of fresh turtles as the main ingredient. Fresh turtles contain rich collagens which can are claimed to be useful for eliminating toxins from the body. As the herbal jelly is mainly made of fresh turtles and poria herbs (Fu Ling), the jelly does not have a significant bitter taste.

Hoi Tin Tong has also produced a series of television advertisements. In order to differentiate their brand from other similar brands, Ng participated in each one of them and built an image of "Hero of Turtle Jelly".

== Products ==
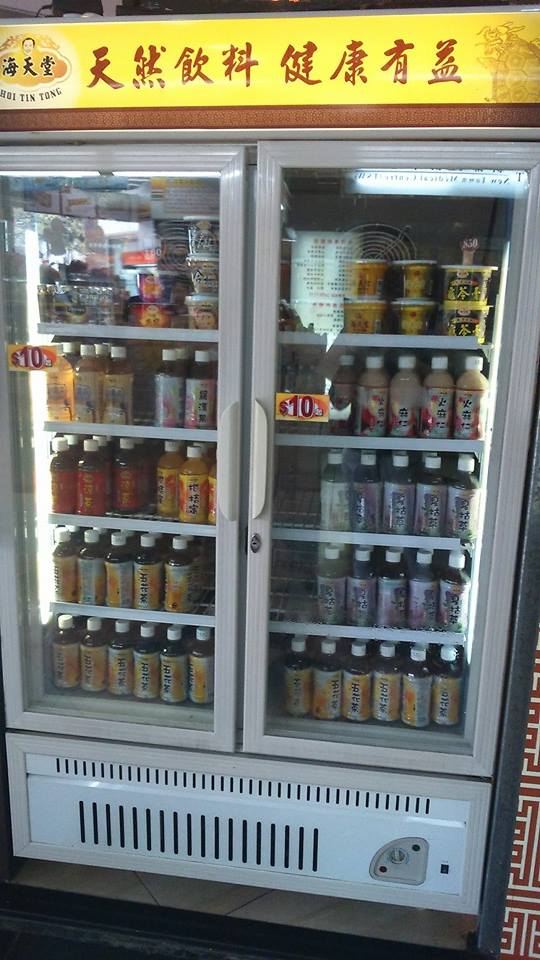
Take-away herbal tea and herbal jelly.

The signature series is the Fresh Herbal Jelly Series. This series includes Hong Kong Traditional Herbal Jelly, turtle jelly (Gui Ling Gow) and Fritillaria Bulb (Chuan Bei) Herbal Jelly.

Moreover, Freshness Retained Jelly Series is a newly developed series. Some above-mentioned products are packed in disposable zip-lock containers in order to ensure the quality of takeout food such as Herbal Jelly, Chuan Bei Herbal Jelly and Turtle Jelly.

Additionally, Hoi Tin Tong provides vegetarians with packed Poria Herbal Jelly (Fu Ling Gao) which is similar to Herbal Jelly.

Apart from herbal jelly products, Hoi Tin Tong also offers citizens Healthy Herbal Drink Series including Hemp Seed Tea (Huo Ma Ren), Spica Prunellae (Xia Ku Cao) Tea, Almond Tea and Five Flower Tea.

Hoi Tin Tong also provides Chinese Herbal Series. There are Herbal Jelly Essence, Cooling 24 and Slimming Tea in such series.

In an attempt to broaden the market and to attract customers, Hoi Tin Tong has introduced a new series called Maintain Youthfulness. This series focuses more on beauty care. The products include Turtle (Gui Ling) Tea, Bird’s Nest and Hasma.

== Turtle gelatin crisis in 2013 ==
As the leading company in the Hong Kong herbal industry, in 2013, Hoi Tin Tong was condemned by citizens and media for selling moldy and fraudulent turtle gelatin to customers. These two crises belonged to the fields of food safety and food quality and aroused publics’ concerns. Consumer Council got more than 12 complaints over the hotline.

On 11 September, Choi Kwok-keung, a former shareholder and senior manager released a video clip displaying that an employee of Hoi Tin Tong was rinsing molds off from the surface of bowls of turtle jelly and then sold them to customers. The Health Inspectors collected samples from 81 retail points for testing. The report showed that the total bacterial count and microbiology of the samples did not exceed the legal limit and no irregularities or impurities were found.

On 12 September, the City University of Hong Kong announced a laboratory experiment and study report related to the main ingredient of turtle jelly, turtle shells. The result revealed that among the three samples of Hoi Tin Tong’s products, two contained only a very small amount of turtle-shell collagen while none could be found in the third sample. Founder Ng Yiu-ming defended that prolonged boiling could lead to the lack of collagens.

Hoi Tin Tong then used a series of public relations strategies and crisis management tactics to rebuild the company’s image. They held conferences in both Hong Kong and Guangzhou to clarify the safety of their products. They further set up customer hotline and invited a celebrity, Lo Hoi-pang, to promote through television advertisements.

== See also ==
- Guilinggao
- List of Chinese desserts
- Herbal tea shops
