= Hung Fook Tong =

Herbal tea shop chain in Hong Kong

鴻福堂集團
- Traded as: SEHK: 1446
- Industry: Beverages
- Founded: 1986
- Headquarters: Hong Kong12/F, 98 Adp Pentagon Centre, Texaco Road, Tsuen Wan, New Territories, Hong Kong
- Key people: 謝寶達 (chairman)
- Products: Chinese herb tea
- Website: www.hungfooktong.com

Hung Fook Tong (Chinese: 鴻福堂; Jyutping: hung4 fuk1 tong4; pinyin: Hóngfú Táng) is a chain of herbal tea shops based in Hong Kong, specializing in Chinese herb teas, soups, healthy food and guilinggao. In 2015, Hung Fook Tong had a market share of 37.5% in Hong Kong's wellness drink market. The chain was founded in 1986 by Tse Po-tat, Kwan Wang-yung and Wong Pui-chu, and has been publicly traded on the Hong Kong Stock Exchange since 23 June 2014.
