= Mee ka tee =

Laotian pork curry noodle soup

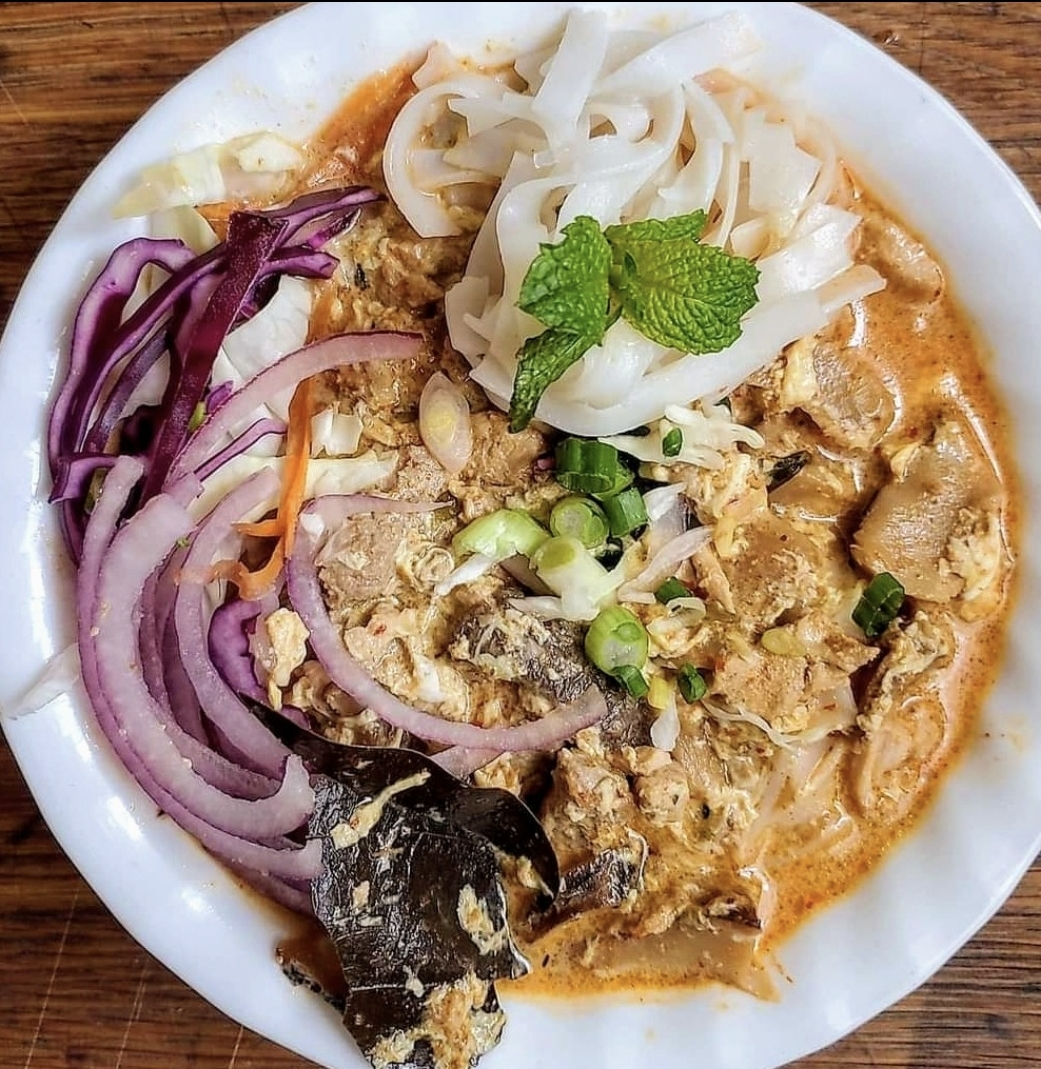
- Alternative names: mee katee Lao, mee kati Vientiane, mee gati
- Type: Soup
- Place of origin: Laos
- Main ingredients: Rice noodles, coconut milk, egg, curry
- Similar dishes: Khao poon

Mee ka tee (Lao: ໝີ່ກະທິ), also known as mee ka tee Lao, mee ka tee Vientiane, Laotian pork curry noodle soup, mee kati, mee kathi or mee gati, is a Laotian red curry and coconut milk egg drop noodle soup originating from Vientiane, Laos. Mee ka tee is a noodle soup consisting of rice noodles in broth with coconut cream, hand-pounded red curry paste, ground (minced) pork, peanuts and egg, topped with fresh shredded cabbage, cilantro, green onions, beansprouts and mint. Sometimes mee ka tee is served with Laotian puffed sticky rice and deep-fried sun-dried peppers.

Mee ka tee in the Lao language literally means "coconut milk noodles". Mee means 'noodle', and ka tee means 'coconut cream/milk'. It is said to be the sweeter and creamier cousin of khao poon, or even a soupy version of pad Thai.

== See also ==
- List of soups
- Mee siam
