= Khao poon =

Southeast Asian noodle dish originating from Laos

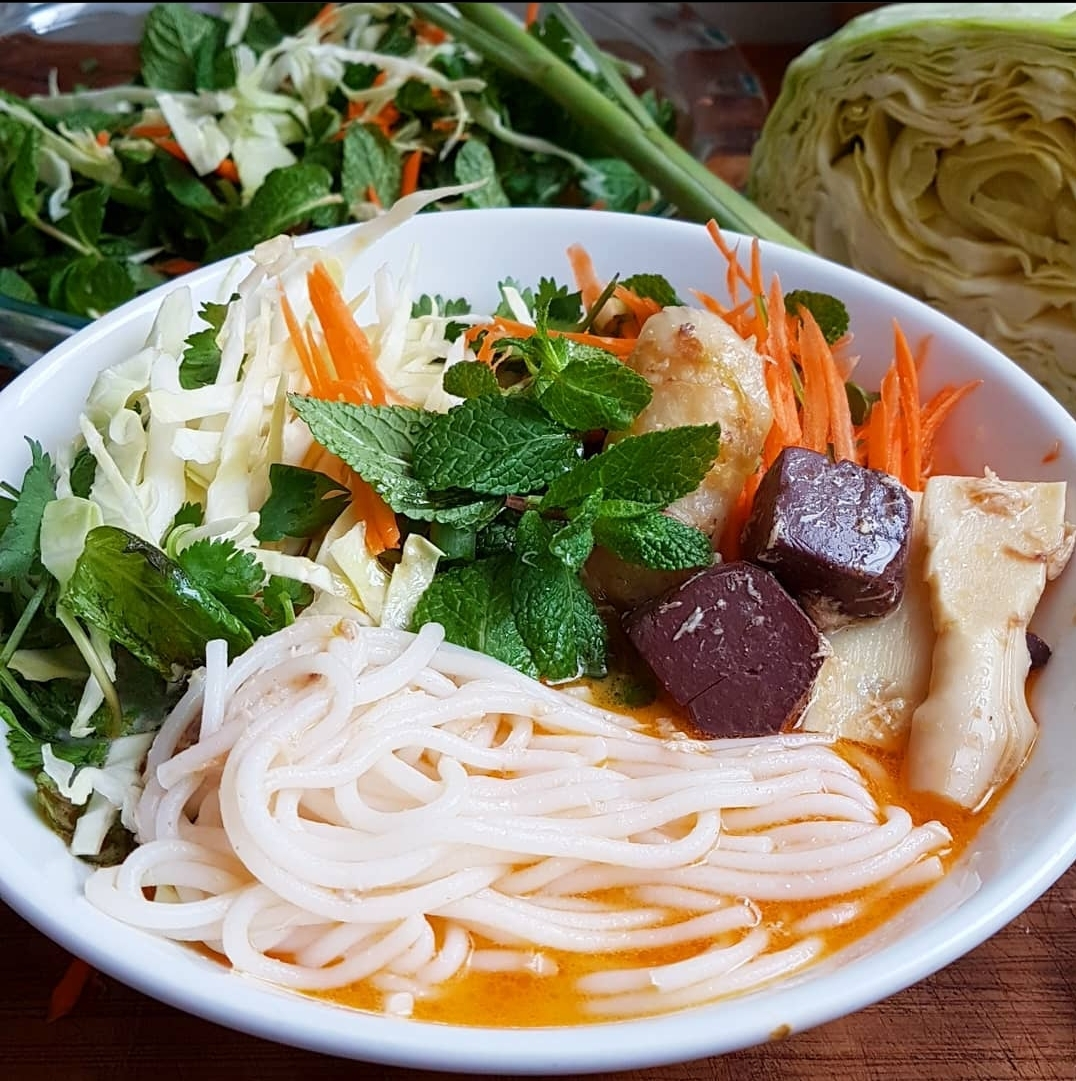
- Alternative names: Lao royal vermicelli curry soup, laksa
- Type: Soup
- Place of origin: Laos
- Main ingredients: Rice vermicelli, meat (chicken, fish, or pork), fish sauce, padaek, lime leaves, galangal, garlic, shallots, Lao chillies
- Variations: Khao poon nam phik, khao poon nam jaew

Khao poon (Lao: ເຂົ້າປຸ້ນ, pronounced [kʰà(ː)w pûn]); also known as Lao royal vermicelli curry soup or Lao laksa and sometimes spelled kapoon, khao poun or khao pun) is a popular national noodle soup of Laos. Khao poon is one type of Lao rice vermicelli soup that is often made with pounded chicken, fish, or pork in coconut milk broth (or without coconut milk) and seasoned with common Lao ingredients such as fish sauce, padaek, lime leaves, galangal, garlic, shallots, Lao chillies, and fish mint. Different versions of the dish are also in Malaysia, Thailand, Indonesia, Cambodia, Singapore, and the United States.

The process of making khao poon could have been brought by the Lao ancestors as they migrated into the Greater Mekong Subregion from Southern China. It is also likely that the khao poon noodles were introduced to Laos by Chinese merchants because Luang Prabang and Vientiane was part of an ancient trade route with China. Laotians had been making khao poon noodles soup for sale at the market and for their own consumption long before the French arrived in Laos in the 1800s.

Coconut milk curry was probably introduced to Laos during the indianization of the Lao Lan Xang kingdom in the fourteen century by the Khmer, Indian merchants, or even as early as the seventh century by Buddhist monks. Several centuries later Lan Xang would signed a contract with the Dutch East Indian Company and trade directly with the world through the ports of Cambodia.

Khao poon is often described as Lao royal vermicelli coconut curry soup due to its bright red and golden colors representing the colors of the Lao royal family.

The traditional recipes for different types of khao poon served to Laotian royals can be found in a collection of hand written recipes from Phia Sing (1898-1967), the king's personal chef and master of ceremonies. Phia Sing's hand written recipes were compiled and published for the first time in 1981.

American writer and filmmaker Harry Hervey (1900-1951) described khao poon as a kind of macaroni in broth in his account of a dinner offered by the Lao prince Phetsarath Rattanavongsa (1890-1959) in Luang Prabang, Laos, during his travel to French Indochina in the 1920s. According to Alfred Raquez (1862-1907), a French photographer and writer, who visited Laos at the beginning of 1900, this Lao macaroni soup was sold in the markets of Luang Prabang. During the 1950s, André-Yvette Gouineau, the famous French resistance fighter and France's national hero, was a professor at lychee de Vientiane, Laos. While in the Laos, Gouineau collected several traditional Lao recipes including khao poon. Gouineau described khao poon as a "dish of vermicelli served with raw vegetables and a special sauce; it is very nourishing.

Gouineau's recipe echoed Phia Sing's recipe for khao poon nam phrik. The two recipes consisted of using already cooked pork and fish combined and mashed in a pestle and mortar with spices and herbs before adding the mixture to freshly squeezed coconut milk, padaek, and broth. The dish is served with finely sliced banana flower, bean sprouts and mint. The final plating of khao poon was meticulously described in the recipe as "filling the bottom of the soup bowl with vermicelli, add several pitches of the various raw vegetables according to their taste and preferences and bathe the whole with a generous helping of the creamy sauce".

Various versions of khao poon exist:

Khao poon nam phik, also called khao poon nam kathee (with coconut milk)

Khao poon nam jaew (without coconut milk), khao poon nam par (with fish sauce)

Khao poon nam ped - Lao duck vermicelli curry noodle Soup

Khao poon nam paa - Lao fish vermicelli curry noodle Soup

Khao poon nam gai - Lao chicken vermicelli curry noodle Soup

== See also ==
- Mee ka tee
- Bún (Vietnam)
- Laksa (Indonesia, Malaysia, Singapore)
- Khanom chin
- List of soups
- Rice noodles
- Rice vermicelli
