= Sago with coconut milk =

Burmese and Thai dessert

- Alternative names: Ono thagu; sakhu nam kathi
- Type: Dessert
- Place of origin: Myanmar (Burma), Thailand
- Region or state: Southeast Asia
- Associated cuisine: Burmese and Thai cuisine
- Main ingredients: coconut milk; sago
- Similar dishes: Chè, Mango pomelo sago

Sago with coconut milk (Burmese: အုန်းနို့သာကူ; Thai: สาคูน้ำกะทิ; RTGS: sakhu nam kathi) is a Burmese and Thai dessert. The main components of this recipe are sago and coconut milk. The dish can be decorated with many toppings, including taro, sweet potato, coconut, yellow corn, banana, and others. It is similar to various forms of Vietnamese chè.

== Preparation ==
Making sago with coconut milk takes two steps. First, make the soft starch base. Then, make and prepare the salted coconut sauce. The main ingredients for the soft starch base are tapioca pearls, sugar, water, and sweet corn. The main ingredients for the coconut sauce are just coconut milk and salt. For fragrance, you can use natural flavoring like pandan leaves or artificial flavoring of pandan leaf or jasmine.

To prepare the dessert, start by making the starch base, quickly rinse the tapioca pearls. Next, add them to boiling water. The natural or artificial flavoring can be added to the water for fragrance. Stir the pearls and simmer until they gelatinize and become translucent. Stir in the white sugar, palm sugar, and extras like sweet corn or young coconut near the end. Adding these late helps the sugar melt without stopping the pearls from cooking. The warm mixture is then portioned into serving bowls. Grab another pot to make the coconut topping. Warm the coconut milk on low heat and add a pinch of salt to keep the oil from separating. Heat the mixture until it warms through and thickens up. This salty topping perfectly balances the sweet sago. To serve, pour the warm coconut sauce over bowls of sago. You can eat this dessert fresh and warm or chill it in the fridge for enjoying later.

== History and Evolution ==
The history of sago dates back through royal traditions and regional culinary shifts in Thailand. It began around the reign of King Rama I (1782–1809 CE / 2325–2352 BE) when troops marched to Vientiane, Laos, bringing back culinary influences and royal connections. Originally, authentic sago starch was extracted from the pith of sago palm trees aged 12 to 15 years old found in southern Thailand. Over time, as real sago palm starch grew increasingly scarce and difficult to source, local culinary practices adapted by substituting it with tapioca flour rolled into small round balls. Furthermore, historical roots of warm sago desserts like Sago Piak trace back through eras such as the Ayutthaya period (1351–1767 CE / 1893–2310 BE. Today, this dessert remains deeply woven into Thai culture. It is frequently prepared for family gatherings, traditional community festivals, and welcoming guests, while utilizing flexible modern toppings such as young coconut, corn, taro, or longan.

== Variations ==
Sago with coconut milk is one of the desserts with sago pearls that commonly spread across Southeast Asian countries.

=== Thailand ===
Known locally as Sago Piak (สาคูเปียก), this dessert traces its roots to the Ayutthaya period. It was originally made from Sago starch which can be found in sago palm trees, aged 12 to 15 years old, in southern Thailand. Later on, real sago starch became harder to find. Therefore, people started using tapioca flour and rolling it into small round balls as a substitution. Nowadays, the dessert is often made to eat with family, traditional festivals, or treat guests in the community. People can add toppings such as young coconut, corn, taro, or longan.

=== Myanmar ===
Sago with coconut milk is called Ono Thagu or Moh Let Saung in Myanmar. This dessert is a part of traditional Burmese food. It is a common sweet treat that people enjoy it as a snack or a dessert after a meal. Burmese people often have sago with coconut milk and sweet toppings like sugar syrup or sweet potato.

=== Vietnam ===
There are several Vietnamese Chè dishes that are similar to Sago with coconut milk. Che is a generic term, referring to the entire category of Vietnamese dessert soup or puddings. It can have beans, peas, fruits, jelly, root crops or glutinous rice.

The following type of Che are considered similar or equivalent;

Che Bap: Known as Vietnamese sweet corn pudding. It is made with corn, small tapioca or sago pearls, and sugar simmered into thick pudding, and topped with coconut cream.

Che Chuoi : It is made with sliced bananas cooked with tapioca pearl then cooked in or topped with coconut milk. It can be served warm or chilled. Modern variations sometimes incorporate ingredients like taro, durian, or black sticky rice.

Che Hoa Cau: It is made by cooking split mung beans in a base of water, sugar, and tapioca starch. It serves the mixture with a sauce made of coconut milk, sugar, salt, and tapioca starch added directly before consumption. The dish takes its name from areca nut palm flowers because the beans visually match the flower petals.

Che Ba Ba: A coconut milk base filled with chunks of cassava, sweet potatoes, sago pearls, and pandan jelly.

Che Khoai Mon: A sweet dessert soup or pudding made with taro, sticky rice, and coconut milk. The pandan extract or leaves can be added to give some green color.

Che Bot Bang: A sweet soup dessert made with tapioca pearls and mung bean fillings in a coconut milk sauce. The mung bean is made from peeled and cooked yellow mung beans that are mashed with sugar, shaped into small balls, and wrapped inside the tapioca dough. The coconut milk is simmered with water, sugar, and pandan leaves. It is served hot with sesame seeds. Sugar can be added to add sweetness.

=== Cambodia ===
In Cambodia, the dessert made by simmering ripe banana in coconut milk, sago and sweetened with palm syrup is called Chek Ktis (ចេកខ្ទិះ) This traditional Khmer sweet is a staple in Cambodian households, commonly enjoyed as a warm dessert or afternoon treat, and is also one of the decadent desserts to finish off a Cambodian banquet. For an authentic touch, the dessert can be served with toasted sesame seeds.

== See also ==
- List of Thai desserts and snacks
