= Egg tong sui =

Soup

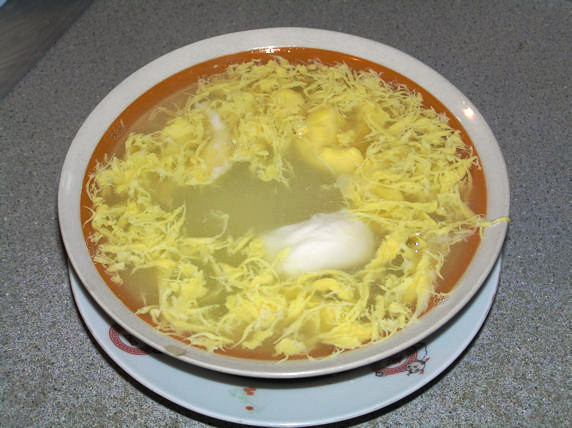
- Type: Tong sui
- Place of origin: China
- Serving temperature: Hot

Egg tong sui
- Traditional Chinese: 雞蛋糖水
- Simplified Chinese: 鸡蛋糖水
- Jyutping: gai1 daan6*2 tong4 seoi2
- Hanyu Pinyin: jī dàn táng shuǐ
- Literal meaning: egg sugar water
Transcriptions
Standard Mandarin
- Hanyu Pinyin: jī dàn táng shuǐ
Yue: Cantonese
- Jyutping: gai1 daan6*2 tong4 seoi2

Egg tong sui is a classic tong sui (sweet soup) within Cantonese cuisine. It is also known as daan tong sui or sweet egg soup. It is essentially a sweet version of egg drop soup as it is considered a traditional Chinese dessert soup.

== Difference between egg tong sui and egg drop soup ==
The difference between the two is that the dessert, egg tong sui, features strands of egg in a clear broth flavored with ginger and rock sugar while egg drop soup has swirls of beaten eggs in flavorful, chicken broth.

== See also ==
- List of Chinese soups
- List of soups
