= 24 flavors =

Cantonese herbal tea

24 flavors (Chinese: 廿四老味茶 or 廿四味; pinyin: niàn sì wèi; Jyutping: jaa6 sei3 mei6) is a Cantonese herbal tea, consumed for medicinal purposes. Its name refers to the fact that it is a combination of many different ingredients (around 24, although it may feature as few as 10 or as many as 28 or more). The recipe is not fixed, and thus may vary according to the producer.

The tea is somewhat bitter in taste and may be consumed by a person who has too much 熱氣; yeet-hey or 'hot air'.

== Typical ingredients (will vary by producer) ==
- Mulberry leaf (桑叶)
- Chrysanthemum flower (菊花)
- Japanese Honeysuckle flower (金银花)
- Bamboo leaf (竹叶)
- Peppermint (薄荷)
- Imperata cylindrica (茅根)
- Siraitia grosvenorii (罗汉果)
- Agastache rugosa (藿香)
- Perilla frutescens (紫苏)
- Elsholtzia (香薷)
- Fermented soybean (淡豆鼓)
- Cleistocalyx operculatus flower (水翁花)
- Microcos paniculata leaf (布渣叶)
- Ilex rotunda (救必应)

== See also ==
- Chinese herbology
