= Zuppa pavese =

Italian soup

- Alternative names: Zuppa alla pavese
- Type: Soup
- Course: Primo (Italian course)
- Place of origin: Italy

Zuppa pavese or zuppa alla pavese is an Italian soup consisting of broth into which slices of stale bread and poached eggs are placed. It is generally served with grated Parmesan.

A legend claims that it was created by a peasant girl who added an egg to soup for King Francis I of France while he was being held prisoner after the Battle of Pavia.

One way of preparing it is to place fried bread in a soup plate with cheese and a raw egg yolk on top. The hot broth is then poured over it, cooking the egg lightly.

== See also ==
- List of Italian soups
