= Mango pomelo sago =

Hong Kong dessert

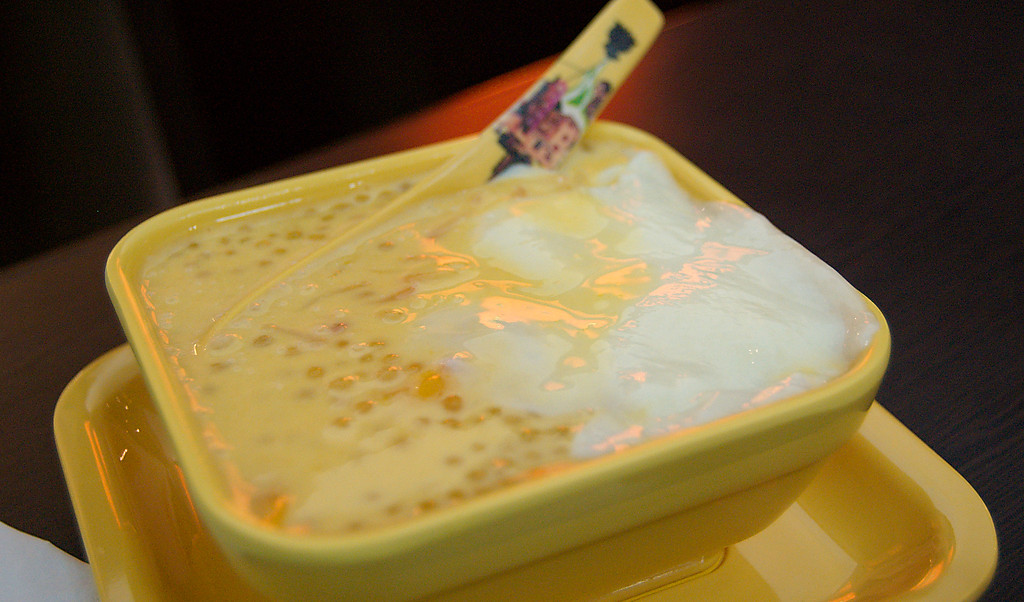
- Alternative names: Yeung ji gum lo Yangzhi Ganlu; Yangzhi Nectar
- Course: Dessert
- Place of origin: Hong Kong
- Serving temperature: Cold
- Main ingredients: Mango, pomelo, tapioca, coconut milk, cream, sugar
- Variations: ice cream, ice pop, pudding
- Food energy (per serving): 264 kcal (1,100 kJ)
- Similar dishes: Sago with coconut milk

Mango pomelo sago
- Traditional Chinese: 楊枝甘露
- Simplified Chinese: 杨枝甘露
- Literal meaning: poplar branch sweet dew
Transcriptions
Standard Mandarin
- Hanyu Pinyin: yáng zhī gān lù
Yue: Cantonese
- Jyutping: joeng4 zi1 gam1 lou6

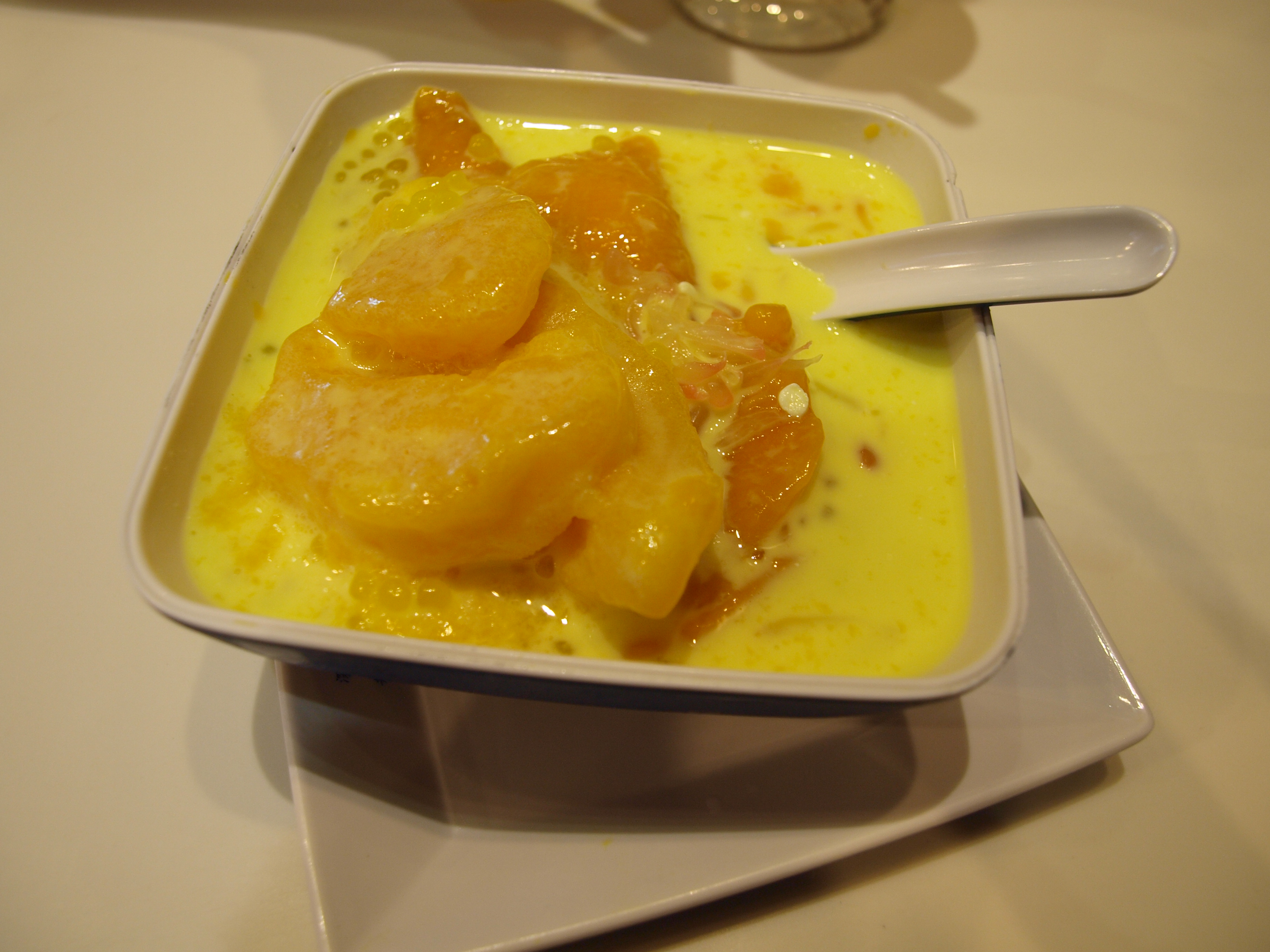
A bowl of mango pomelo sago in a dessert store

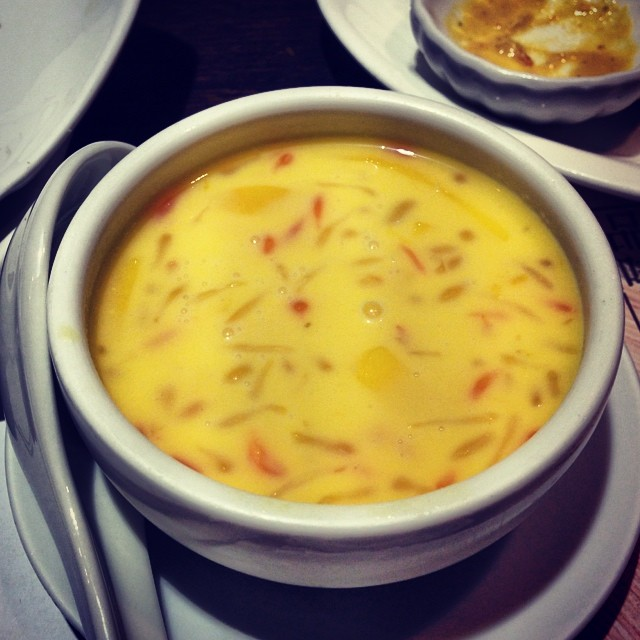
Lei Garden's mango pomelo sago

Mango pomelo sago is a type of contemporary Hong Kong dessert. It usually includes diced mango, pomelo, sago, coconut milk, and milk. It can be found in many Chinese restaurants and dessert stores in Hong Kong, as well as in Singapore, Malaysia, Guangdong, Taiwan and Papua New Guinea. Over time, this dessert has evolved into many different variations; for example, it can serve as a flavor for other desserts and drinks.

== Origin ==
The Chinese name of "mango pomelo sago" (楊枝甘露, meaning "willow branch manna") comes from the concept of dropping manna from a willow branch which makes people feel refreshed when they taste it. It is also a magical tool used by Guanyin in the 16th century Chinese novel Journey to the West.

This dessert was said to be invented by Lei Garden in 1984 when it decided to set up its first branch in Singapore. Wong Wing-chee, the former head chef of the Lei Garden, alleges to have invented mango pomelo sago as a new dish of the Lei Garden. Inspired by the local ingredients in Singapore, Wong decided to make a dessert featuring mango, pomelo, and sago.

Although mango pomelo sago in its current form was invented by Lei Garden, ingredients like sago have been used in Chinese cuisine for millennia. On the coast of Southern China, researchers recently discovered traces of Sago palm starch on archaic cooking utensils that date back 5,000 years ago. This early cooking instrument was primarily used to prepare food during an era when farmers in the Southern region were growing more sago, and soy. Additionally, researchers suggest that due to the plentiful growth of sago, it was used as one of their main sources of carbohydrates. Zhao Rukuo, a Chinese historian of the 12th century, noted that in the Kingdom of Boni, they used sha-hu, or sago, as their main grain as there was low production of wheat and other sources of carbohydrates.

== Ingredients ==
- Fresh mango
- Pomelo
- Tapioca pearls (sago)
- Coconut milk
- Evaporated milk or cream
- Sugar or syrup

== Variations ==
Many new mango pomelo sago-based desserts have become popular, including:

- Pudding, ice cream and ice lolly with the flavour of mango pomelo sago
- Mango pomelo sago flavor of snow skin mooncake for Mid-Autumn Festival
- Mango pomelo sago can be served alongside tofu pudding(douhua), coffee or aloe vera
- Bottled mango pomelo sago flavoured drinks
- Rice ball (Tangyuan) and grass jelly may be used to substitute for sago in the recipe
- Mango pomelo sago flavored cake during Chinese New Year
- Gulaman Recipe, Filipino Sago

== See also ==
- Mango pudding
- List of Chinese desserts
- List of desserts
- Tapioca pudding
