= Guilinggao =

Turtle shell-based Chinese medicine

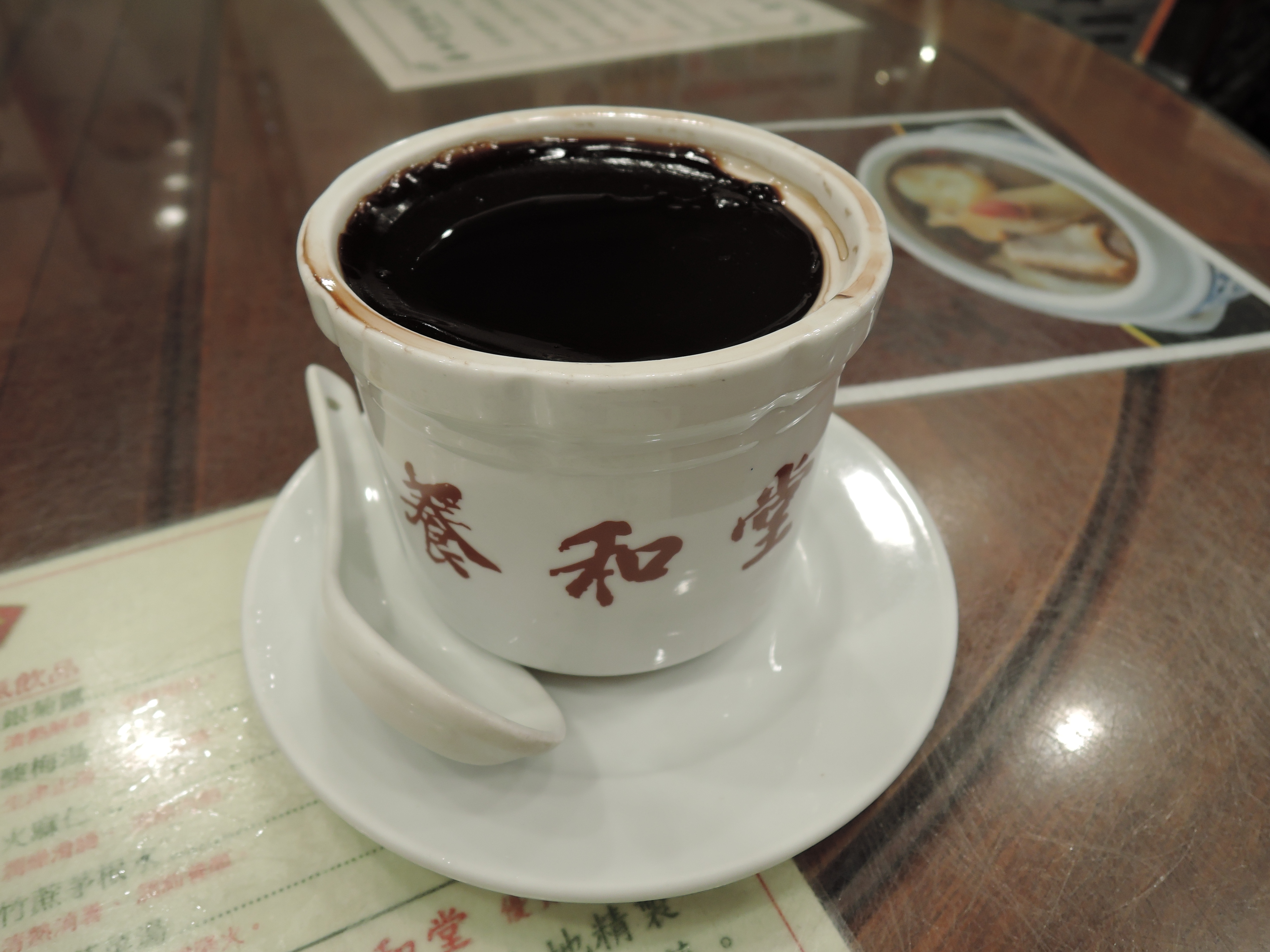
- Alternative names: Tortoise Jelly, Turtle Jelly
- Type: Pudding
- Course: Dessert
- Place of origin: China
- Region or state: Wuzhou, Guangxi
- Main ingredients: Plastron, Chinese herbs

Guilinggao
- Traditional Chinese: 龜苓膏
- Simplified Chinese: 龟苓膏
- Literal meaning: turtle and Smilax glabra jelly
Transcriptions
Standard Mandarin
- Hanyu Pinyin: guī líng gāo
Yue: Cantonese
- Jyutping: gwai1 ling4 gou1

Guilinggao (Chinese: 龜苓膏; pinyin: Guīlínggāo), literal translated as tortoise jelly (though not technically correct) or turtle powder, is a jelly-like Chinese medicine, also sold as a dessert. It was traditionally made from the gao, or paste of the plastron (bottom shell) from the turtle Cuora trifasciata (commonly known as "three-lined box turtle", or "golden coin turtle", 金錢龜) and a variety of herbal products, in particular, China roots Smilax glabra (土伏苓, Tu fu ling). Although the critically endangered golden coin turtle (Cuora trifasciata) is commercially farmed in modern China, it is extremely expensive; therefore, even when turtle-derived ingredients are used in commercially available guilinggao, they come from other, more commonly available, turtle species.

Commercially available guilinggao sold as a dessert might not contain significant turtle shell powder.

== History ==
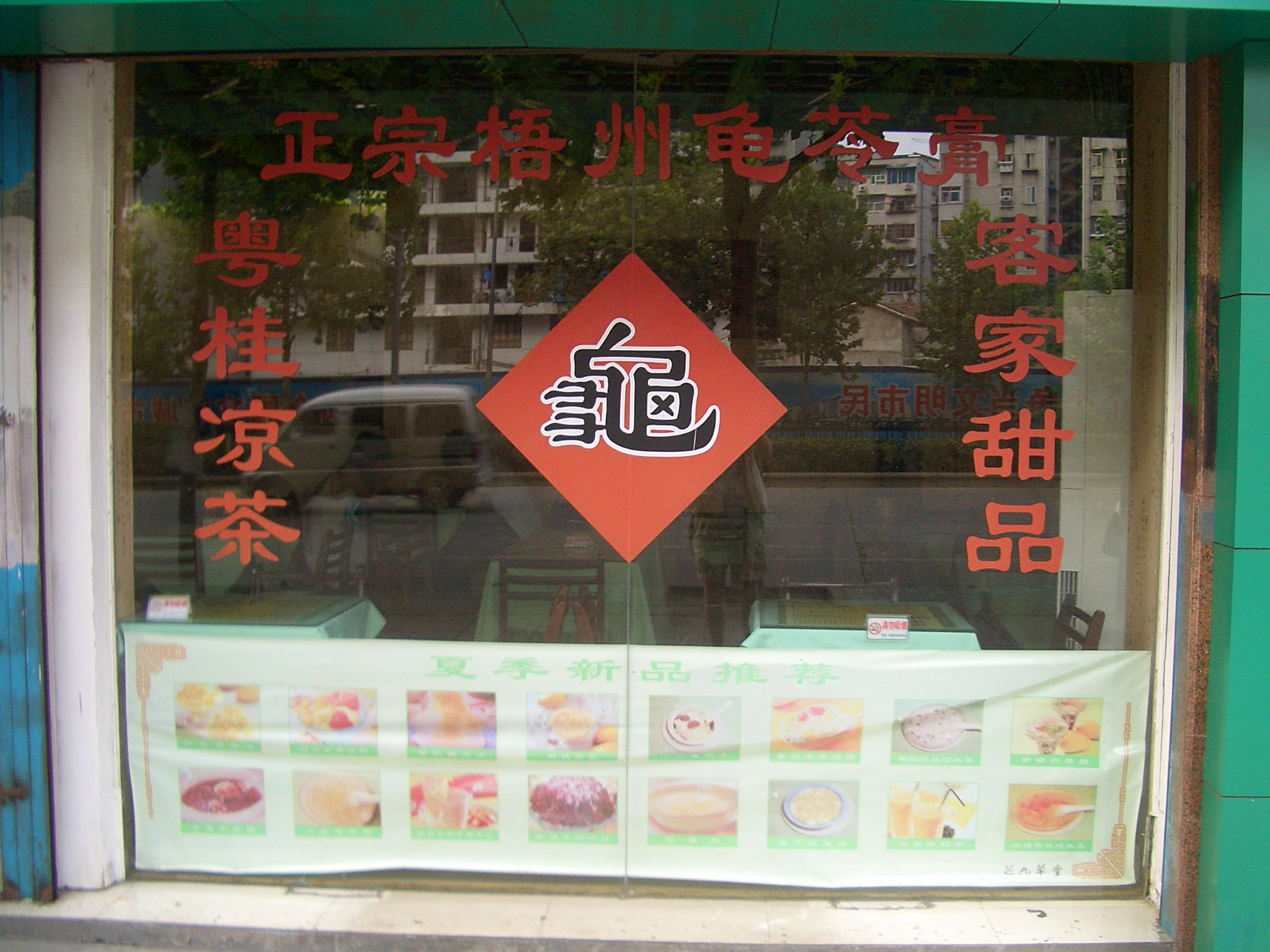
A restaurant in Wuhan advertising "Genuine Wuzhou Guilinggao"

According to a legend, the Tongzhi Emperor nearly cured his smallpox by taking guilinggao. However, Empress Dowager Cixi believed his disease could be cured by worshipping a smallpox idol. She succeeded in convincing the emperor to quit his guilinggao regimen. The emperor died soon after.

Guilinggao is thought to be good for the skin, allowing for a healthier complexion upon repeated consumption. Other supposed positive effects of the jelly includes improving circulation, assisting muscle growth, relieving itching, reducing acne, and kidney restoration.

== Variety ==
Regular guilinggao jelly is black in appearance; however, the actual color is more of a dark brown. Naturally, it is not sweet, but slightly bitter, although sweeteners and flavourers such as honey, red bean paste, condensed milk and coconut milk can be added to make it more palatable.

== Availability ==
Relatively inexpensive canned guilinggao jelly with poptop lids and plastic spoons for immediate consumption can be found in many East and Southeast Asian countries, as well as Chinatowns in the United States and Canada. It is also available for purchase in England and New Zealand. There are two varieties, one of them containing Lingzhi powder.

== Preparation ==
Traditional guilinggao recipes require boiling turtle shell for many hours, first by itself, then with a variety of herbal ingredients, so that the liquid is gradually evaporated and a jelly-like residue forms. Rice flour and corn starch are added to thicken the product.

Guilinggao jelly can be prepared at home from commercially sold powdered concentrate (the "guilinggao powder"), similarly to how Jello is made. When it is prepared, other herbal substances, such as ginseng, are added to the jelly to give it certain tastes and medicinal values.

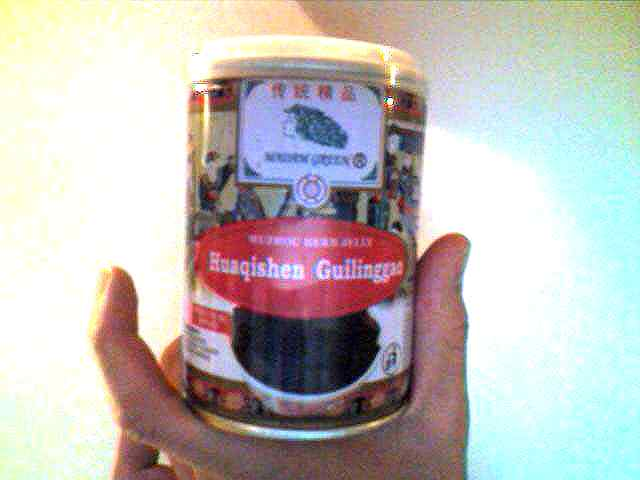
A typical guilinggao dessert can, unopened

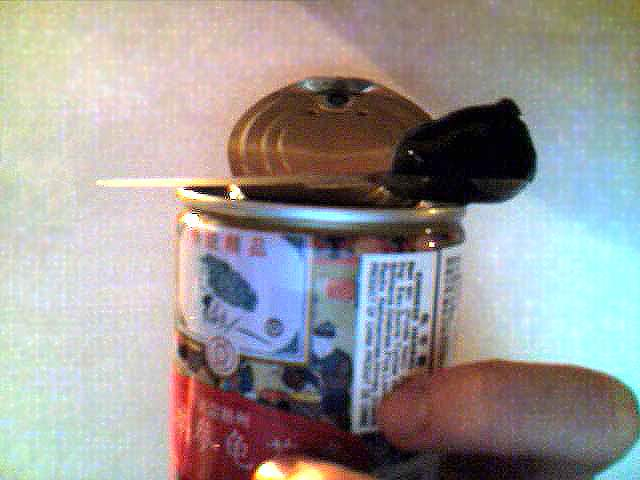
Picture of a Guilinggao jelly

== See also ==
- Grass jelly
- List of Chinese desserts
- List of desserts
