= Beijing cuisine =

Local cuisine of Beijing, the national capital of China

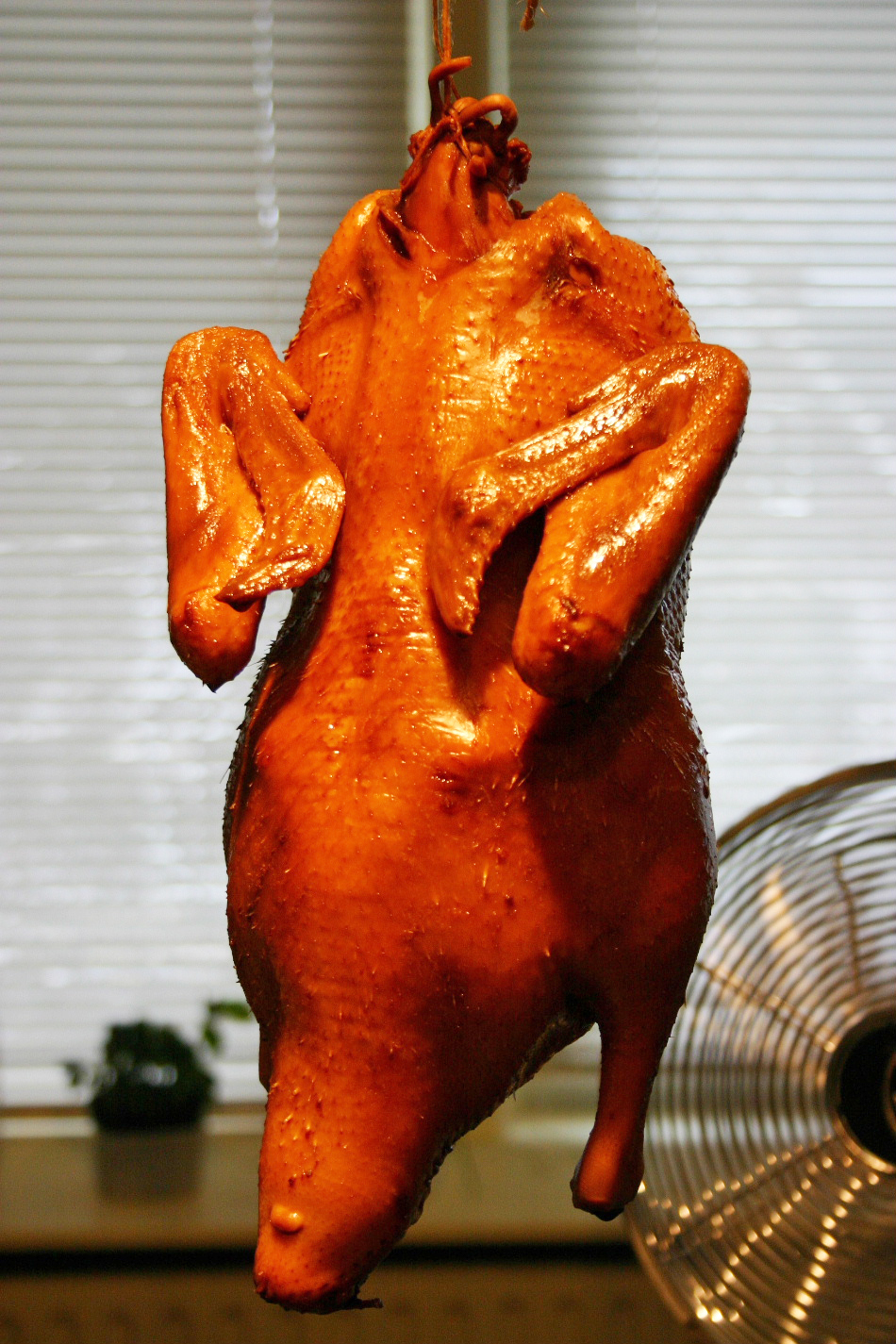
- Peking duck is a famous duck dish from Beijing
- Chinese: 北京菜
Transcriptions
Standard Mandarin
- Hanyu Pinyin: Běijīng cài

Jing cuisine
- Chinese: 京菜
- Literal meaning: Cuisine of the capital
Transcriptions
Standard Mandarin
- Hanyu Pinyin: jīng cài

Beiping cuisine
- Chinese: 北平菜
Transcriptions
Standard Mandarin
- Hanyu Pinyin: Běipíng cài

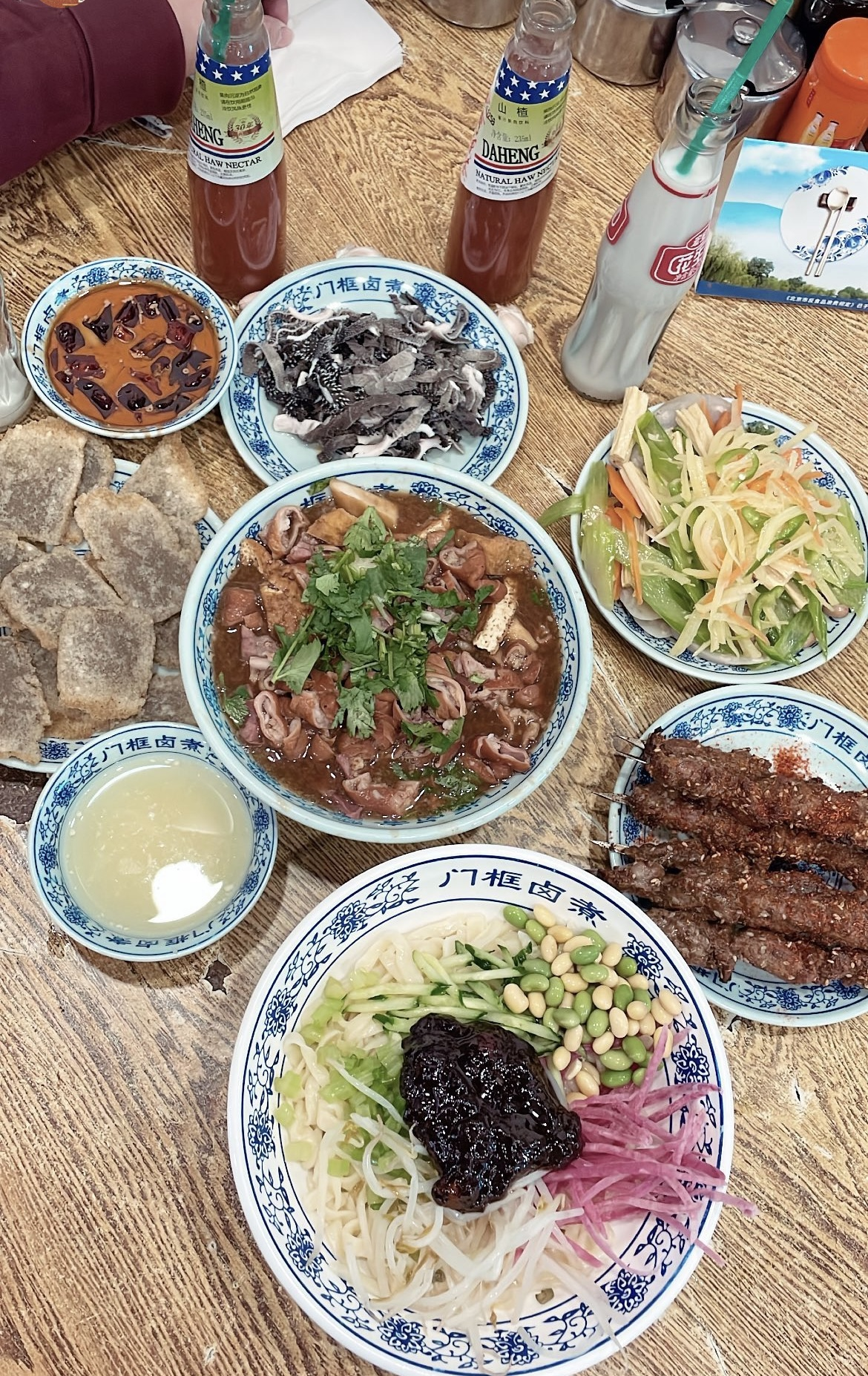
Beijing cuisine in Menkuang Hutong, a century-old restaurant

Beijing cuisine, also known as Jing cuisine, Mandarin cuisine and Peking cuisine and formerly as Beiping cuisine, is the local cuisine of Beijing, the national capital of China.

== Background ==
As Beijing has been the capital of China for centuries, its cuisine is influenced by culinary traditions from all over China, but the style that has the greatest influence on Beijing cuisine is that of the eastern coastal province of Shandong. Beijing cuisine has itself, in turn, also greatly influenced other Chinese cuisines, particularly the cuisine of Liaoning, the Chinese imperial cuisine and the Chinese aristocrat cuisine.

Another tradition that influenced Beijing cuisine (as well as influenced by the latter itself) is the Chinese imperial cuisine that originated from the "Emperor's Kitchen" (御膳房; yùshànfáng), which referred to the cooking facilities inside the Forbidden City, where thousands of cooks from different parts of China showed their best culinary skills to please the imperial family and officials. Therefore, it is sometimes difficult to determine the actual origin of a dish as the term "Mandarin" is generalised and refers not only to Beijing, but other provinces as well. However, some generalisation of Beijing cuisine can be characterised as follows: Foods that originated in Beijing are often snacks rather than main courses, and they are typically sold by small shops or street vendors. There is emphasis on dark soy paste, sesame paste, sesame oil and scallions, and fermented tofu is often served as a condiment. In terms of cooking techniques, methods relating to different ways of frying are often used. There is less emphasis on rice as an accompaniment as compared to many other regions in China, as local rice production in Beijing is limited by the relatively dry climate.

Many dishes in Beijing cuisine that are served as main courses are derived from a variety of Chinese Halal foods, particularly lamb and beef dishes, as well as from Huaiyang cuisine.

Huaiyang cuisine has been praised since ancient times in China and it was a general practice for an official travelling to Beijing to take up a new post to bring along with him a chef specialising in Huaiyang cuisine. When these officials had completed their terms in the capital and returned to their native provinces, most of the chefs they brought along often remained in Beijing. They opened their own restaurants or were hired by wealthy locals. The imperial clan of the Ming dynasty, the House of Zhu, who had ancestry from Jiangsu Province, also contributed greatly in introducing Huaiyang cuisine to Beijing when the capital was moved from Nanjing to Beijing in the 15th century, because the imperial kitchen was mainly Huaiyang style. The element of traditional Beijing culinary and gastronomical cultures of enjoying artistic performances such as Beijing opera while dining directly developed from the similar practice in the culture of Jiangsu and Huaiyang cuisines.

Chinese Islamic cuisine is another important component of Beijing cuisine and was first prominently introduced when Beijing became the capital of the Yuan dynasty. However, the most significant contribution to the formation of Beijing cuisine came from Shandong cuisine, as most chefs from Shandong Province came to Beijing en masse during the Qing dynasty. Unlike the earlier two cuisines, which were brought by the ruling class such as nobles, aristocrats and bureaucrats and then spread to the general populace, the introduction of Shandong cuisine begun with serving the general populace, with much wider market segment, from wealthy merchants to the working class.

== History ==
The Qing dynasty was a major period in the formation of Beijing cuisine. Before the Boxer Rebellion, the foodservice establishments in Beijing were strictly stratified by the foodservice guild. Each category of the establishment was specifically based on its ability to provide for a particular segment of the market. The top ranking establishments served nobles, aristocrats, and wealthy merchants and landlords, while lower ranking establishments served the populace of lower financial and social status. It was during this period when Beijing cuisine gained fame and became recognised by the Chinese culinary society, and the stratification of the foodservice was one of its most obvious characteristics as part of its culinary and gastronomic cultures during this first peak of its formation.

The official stratification was an integral part of the local culture of Beijing and it was not finally abolished officially after the end of the Qing dynasty, which resulted in the second peak in the formation of Beijing cuisine. Meals previously offered to nobles and aristocrats were made available to anyone who could afford them instead of being restricted only to the upper class. As chefs freely switched between jobs offered by different establishments, they brought their skills that further enriched and developed Beijing cuisine. Though the stratification of food services in Beijing was no longer effected by imperial laws, the structure more or less remained despite continuous weakening due to the financial background of the local clientele. The different classes are listed in the following subsections.

=== Zhuang ===
Zhuang (庄; 莊; zhuāng; 'village'), or zhuang zihao (庄字号; 莊字號; zhuāng zìhào; 'village brand') were the top-ranking foodservice establishments, not only in providing foods, but entertainment as well. The form of entertainment provided was usually Beijing opera, and establishments of this class always had long-term contracts with an opera troupe to perform onsite or contracts with famous performers, such as national-treasure-class performers, to perform onsite, though not on a daily basis. Establishments of this category only accepted customers who came as a group and ordered banquets by appointment, and the banquets provided by establishments of this category often included most, if not all tables, at the site. The bulk foodservice business was catering at customers' homes or other locations, often for birthdays, marriages, funerals, promotions and other important celebrations and festivals. When catering, these establishments not only provided what was on the menu, but fulfilled customers' requests.

Leng zhuangzi (冷庄子; 冷莊子; lěng zhuāngzǐ; 'cold village') lacked any rooms to host banquets, and thus their business was purely catering.

=== Tang ===
Tang (堂; táng; 'auditorium'), or tang zihao (堂字号; 堂字號; táng zìhào; 'auditorium brand'), are similar to zhuang establishments, but the business of these second-class establishments was generally evenly divided between onsite banquet hosting and catering (at customers' homes). Establishments of this class would also have long-term contracts with Beijing opera troupes to perform onsite, but they did not have long-term contracts with famous performers, such as national-treasure-class performers, to perform onsite on a regular basis; however, these top performers would still perform at establishments of this category occasionally. In terms of catering at the customers' sites, establishments of this category often only provided dishes strictly according to their menu.

=== Ting ===
Ting (厅; 廳; tīng; 'foyer'), or ting zihao (厅字号; 廳字號; tīng zìhào; 'foyer brand') are foodservice establishments which had more business in onsite banquet hosting than catering at customers' homes. For onsite banquet hosting, entertainment was still provided, but establishments of this category did not have long-term contracts with Beijing opera troupes, so that performers varied from time to time, and top performers usually did not perform here or at any lower-ranking establishments. For catering, different establishments of this category were incapable of handling significant catering on their own, but generally had to combine resources with other establishments of the same ranking (or lower) to do the job.

=== Yuan ===
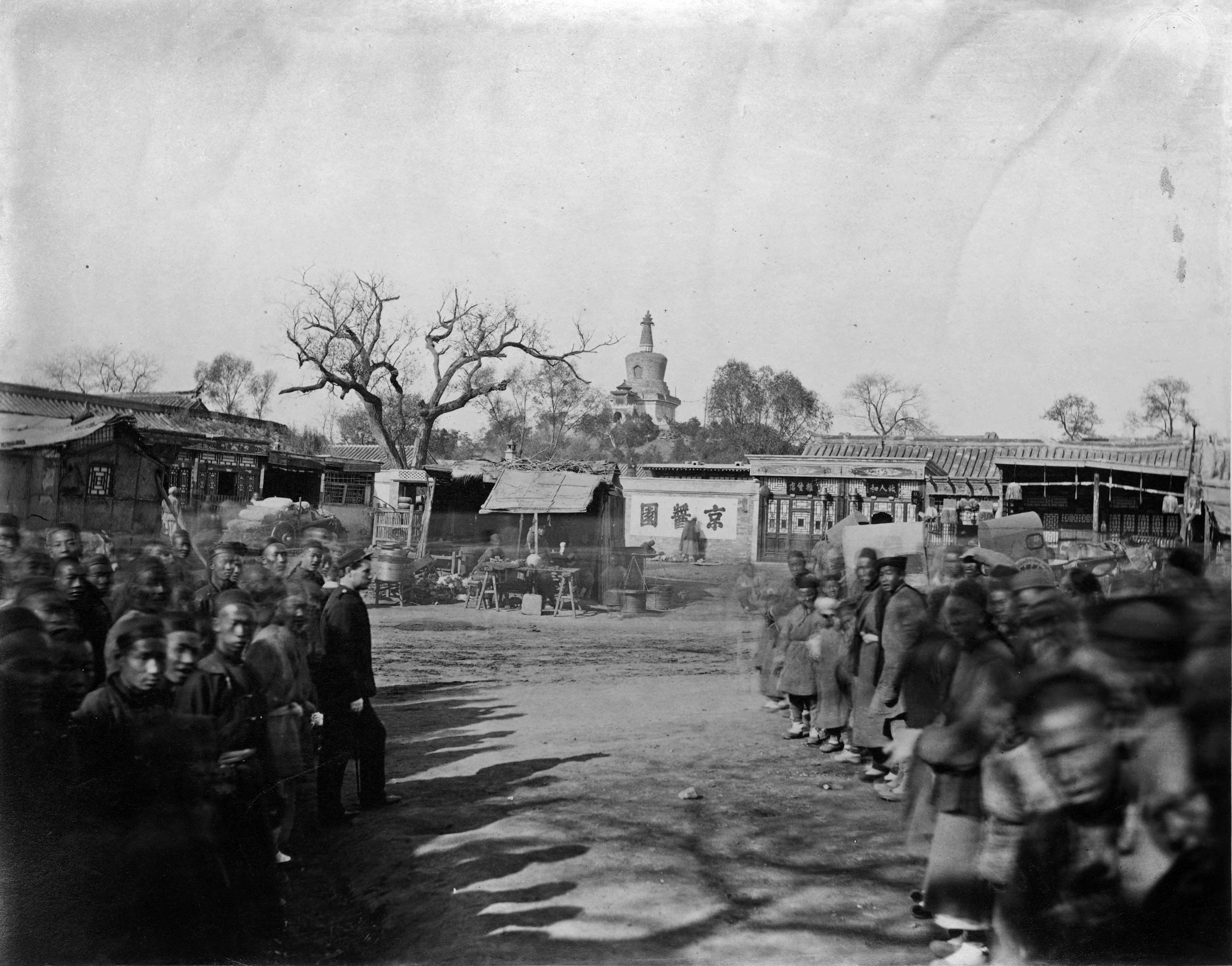
A Jing Jiang Yuan (京醬園) near Beihai, circa 1879.

Yuan (园; 園; yuán; 'garden'), or yuan zihao (园字号; 園字號; yuán zìhào; 'garden brand') did nearly all their business in hosting banquets onsite. Entertainment was not provided on a regular basis, but there were stages built onsite for Beijing opera performers. Instead of being hired by the establishments like in the previous three categories, performers at establishments of this category were usually contractors who paid the establishment to perform and split the earnings according to a certain percentage. Occasionally, establishments of this category would be called upon to help cater at customers' homes, but had to work with others, never taking the lead as establishments like the ting.

=== Lou ===
Lou (楼; 樓; lóu; 'story', 'floor'), or lou zihao (楼字号; 樓字號; lóu zìhào; 'story brand') did the bulk of their business hosting banquets onsite by appointment. In addition, a smaller portion of the business was in serving different customers onsite on a walk-in basis. Occasionally, when catering at customers' homes, establishments of this category would only provide the few specialty dishes they were famous for.

=== Ju ===
Ju (居; jū; 'residence'), or ju zihao (居字号; 居字號; jū zìhào; 'residence brand') generally divided their business evenly into two areas: serving different customers onsite on a walk-in basis, and hosting banquets by appointment for customers who came as one group. Occasionally, when catering at the customers' homes, establishments of this category would only provide the few specialty dishes they were famous for, just like the lou. However, unlike those establishments, which always cooked their specialty dishes on location, establishment of this category would either cook on location or simply bring the already-cooked food to the location.

=== Zhai ===
Zhai (斋; 齋; zhāi; 'study'), or zhai zihao (斋字号; 齋字號; zhāi zìhào; 'study brand') were mainly in the business of serving different customers onsite on a walk-in basis, but a small portion of their income did come from hosting banquets by appointment for customers who came as one group. Similar to the ju, when catering at customers’ homes, establishments of this category would also only provide the few specialty dishes they are famous for, but they would mostly bring the already-cooked dishes to the location, and would only cook on location occasionally.

=== Fang ===
Fang (坊; fǎng; 'workshop'), or fang zihao (坊字号; 坊字號; fǎng zìhào; 'workshop brand'). Foodservice establishments of this category generally did not offer the service of hosting banquets made by appointment for customers who came as one group, but instead, often only offered to serve different customers onsite on a walk-in basis. Establishments of this category or lower would not be called upon to perform catering at the customers' homes for special events.

=== Guan ===
Guan (馆; 館; guǎn; 'restaurant'), or guan zihao (馆字号; 館字號; guǎn zìhào; 'restaurant brand'). Foodservice establishments of this category mainly served different customers onsite on a walk-in basis, and in addition, a portion of the income would be earned from selling to-goes.

=== Dian ===
Dian (店; diàn; 'shop'), or dian zihao (店字号; 店字號; diàn zìhào; 'shop brand'). Foodservice establishments of this category had their own place, like all previous categories, but serving different customers to dine onsite on a walk-in basis only provided half of the overall income, while the other half came from selling to-goes.

=== Pu ===
Pu (铺; 鋪; pù; 'store'), or pu zihao (铺字号; 鋪字號; pù zìhào; 'store brand'). Foodservice establishments of this category ranked next to last, and they were often named after the owners' last names. Establishments of this category had fixed spots of business of their own, but they were smaller than dian, and thus did not have tables, but only seats for customers. As a result, the bulk of the income of establishments of this category was from selling to-goes, while income earned from customers dining onsite only provided a small portion of the overall income.

=== Tan ===
Tan (摊; 攤; tān; 'stand'), or tan zihao (摊字号; 攤字號; tān zìhào; 'stand brand'). The lowest ranking foodservice establishments without any tables, and selling to-goes was the only form of business. In addition to name the food stand after the owners' last name or the food sold, these food stands were also often named after the owners' nicknames.

== Notable dishes and street foods ==
=== Meat and poultry dishes ===
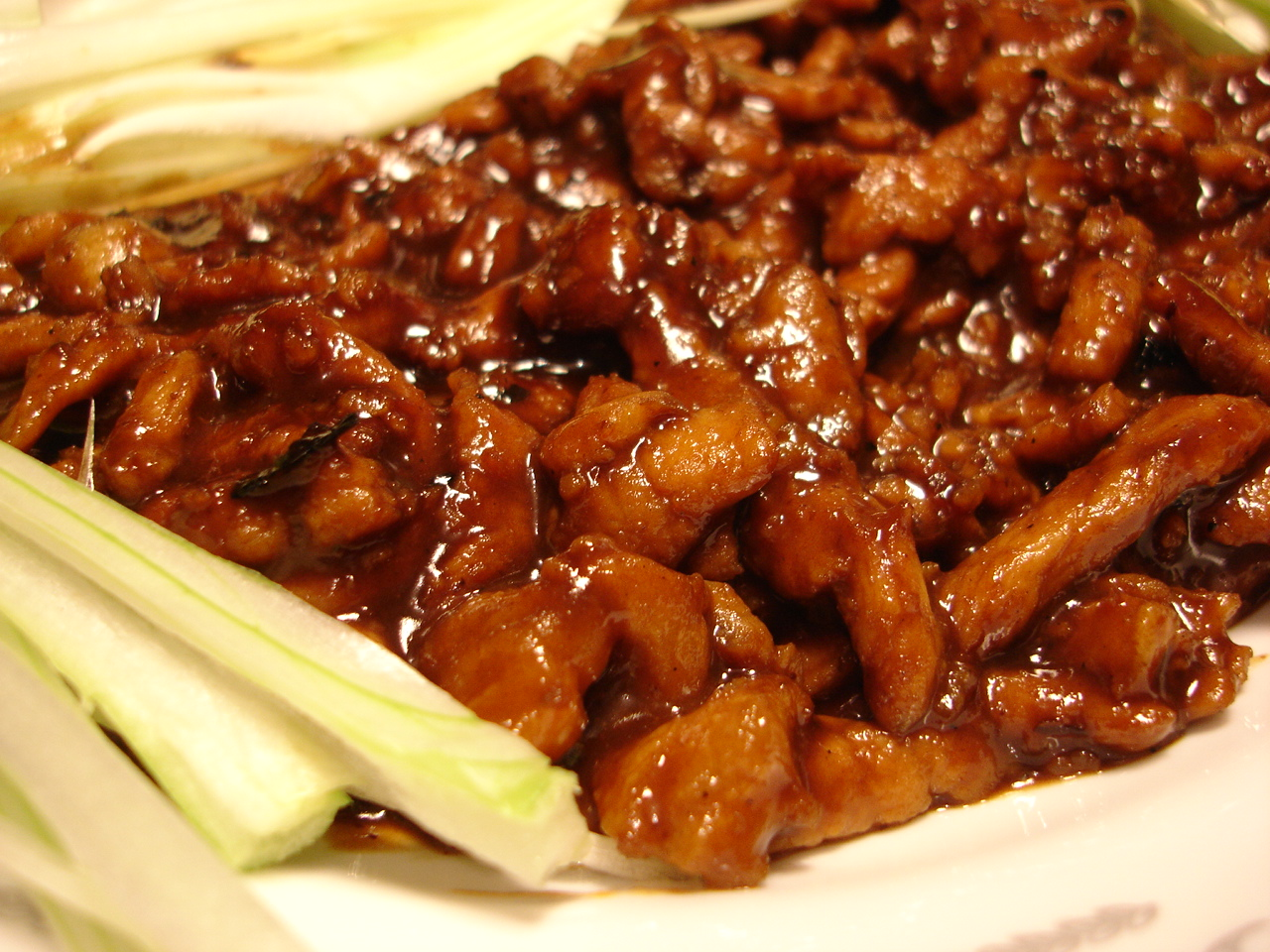
Jing jiang rou si

English	Image	Traditional Chinese	Simplified Chinese	Pinyin	Notes
Beef wrapped in pancake		門釘肉餅	门钉肉饼	méndīng ròubǐng	
Beggar's chicken		富貴雞	富贵鸡	fùguì jī	The dish's name literally means "rich chicken" or "wealthy chicken". It is also known as jiaohua ji (叫化鸡; 叫化雞; jiàohuā jī).
Cold pig's ears in sauce		拌雙脆	拌双脆	bàn shuāngcuì	
Dried soy milk cream in tight roll with beef fillings		炸卷果	炸卷果	zhá juǎnguǒ	
Fried dry soybean cream with diced meat filling		炸響鈴	炸响铃	zhá xiǎnglíng	
Fried meatballs		炸丸子	炸丸子	zhá wánzǐ	
Fried pig's liver wrapped in Chinese small iris		炸卷肝	炸卷肝	zhá juǎngān	
Fried triangle		炸三角	炸三角	zhá sānjiǎo	
Fried wheaten pancake with meat and sea cucumber fillings		褡褳火燒	褡裢火烧	dālián huǒshāo	
Glazed fried egg cake		金絲糕	金丝糕	jīnsīgāo	
Goat or sheep's intestine filled with blood		羊霜腸	羊霜肠	yáng shuāngcháng	
Hot and sour soup		酸辣湯	酸辣汤	suānlà tāng	
Instant-boiled mutton		涮羊肉	涮羊肉	shuàn yángròu	A variant of hot pot which usually features boiled water as its base (with no additional spices) and mutton as the main type of meat.
Lard with flour wrapping glazed in honey		蜜汁葫蘆	蜜汁葫芦	mìzhī húlú	
Lotus ham		蓮棗肉方	莲枣肉方	liánzǎo ròufāng	
Lotus-shaped cake with chicken		蓮蓬雞糕	莲蓬鸡糕	liánpéng jīgāo	
Meatball soup		清湯丸子	清汤丸子	qīngtāng wánzǐ	
Meat in sauce		醬肉	酱肉	jiàngròu	
Meat wrapped in thin mung bean flour pancake		煎餅餜子	煎饼馃子	jiānbǐng guǒzǐ	
Moo shu pork		木須肉	木须肉	mùxūròu	Literally "wood shavings meat"
Napa cabbage hot pot		酸白菜火鍋	酸白菜火锅	suān báicài huǒguō	A variant of hot pot of Northeast China origin. Its main ingredients are pickled napa cabbage, cooked pork belly and other meats, and other typical dishes include leaf vegetables, mushrooms, wontons, egg dumplings, tofu, and seafood. The cooked food is usually eaten with a dipping sauce.
Peking barbecue		北京烤肉	北京烤肉	Běijīng kǎoròu	
Peking duck		北京烤鴨	北京烤鸭	Běijīng kǎoyā	Usually served with pancakes
Peking dumpling		北京餃子	北京饺子	Běijīng jiǎozǐ	
Peking wonton		北京餛飩	北京馄饨	Běijīng húndùn	
Pickled Chinese cabbage with blood-filled pig's intestines		酸菜血腸	酸菜血肠	suāncài xuěcháng	
Pickled meat in sauce		清醬肉	清酱肉	qīngjiàngròu	
Plain boiled pork		白肉	白肉	báiròu	
Pork in broth		蘇造肉	苏造肉	sūzào ròu	
Pork shoulder		水晶肘子	水晶肘子	shuǐjīng zhǒuzǐ	
Quick-fried tripe		爆肚	爆肚	bàodù	
Roasted meat		燒肉	烧肉	shāoròu	Could be beef, pork or mutton
Shredded mung bean skin salad		拌皮絲	拌皮丝	bànpísī	
Soft fried tenderloin		軟炸里脊	软炸里脊	ruǎnzhá lǐjī	
Stewed pig's organs		燉吊子	炖吊子	dùn diàozǐ	
Stir-fried tomato and scrambled eggs		西紅柿炒雞蛋	西红柿炒鸡蛋	xīhóngshì chǎo jīdàn	
Sweet and sour spare ribs		糖醋排骨	糖醋排骨	tángcù páigǔ	
Sweet stir-fried mutton or lamb		它似蜜	它似蜜	tāsìmì	
Wheaten cake boiled in meat broth		滷煮火燒	卤煮火烧	lǔzhǔ huǒshāo	

=== Fish and seafood dishes ===
English	Traditional Chinese	Simplified Chinese	Pinyin	Notes
Abalone with peas and fish paste	蛤蟆鮑魚	蛤蟆鲍鱼	hāmǎ bàoyú	The dish's name literally means "toad abalone".
Boiled fish in household-style	家常熬魚	家常熬鱼	jiācháng áoyú	
Braised fish	酥魚	酥鱼	sūyú	
Egg and shrimp wrapped in corn flour pancake	糊餅	糊饼	húbǐng	
Fish cooked with five kinds of sliced vegetable	五柳魚	五柳鱼	wǔlǐu yú	
Fish cooked with five-spice powder	五香魚	五香鱼	wǔxiāng yú	
Fish in vinegar and pepper	醋椒魚	醋椒鱼	cùjiāo yú	
Fish soaked in soup	乾燒魚	干烧鱼	gānshāo yú	
Sea cucumber with quail egg	烏龍吐珠	乌龙吐珠	wūlóng tǔzhū	The dish's name literally means "the black dragon spits out pearls".
Shrimp chips with egg	金魚戲蓮	金鱼戏莲	jīnyú xìlián	The dish's name literally means "the goldfish playing with the lotus".
Soft fried fish	軟炸魚	软炸鱼	ruǎnzhá yú	

=== Noodles (both vegetarian and non-vegetarian) ===
English	Image	Traditional Chinese	Simplified Chinese	Pinyin	Notes
Naked oats noodle		莜麵搓魚	莜面搓鱼	yóumiàn cuōyú	
Noodles with thick gravy		打滷麵	打卤面	dǎlǔmiàn	
Sesame sauce noodles		麻醬麵	麻醬面	májiàngmiàn	A well-known noodle dish in Northern China. The sesame sauce is mainly made of sesame paste and sesame oil. In American cooking, peanut butter is often a substitute for the sesame paste.
Zhajiangmian		炸醬麵	炸酱面	zhájiàngmiàn	

=== Pastries ===
English	Image	Traditional Chinese	Simplified Chinese	Pinyin	Notes
Fried butter cake		奶油炸糕	奶油炸糕	nǎiyóu zhágāo	
Fried cake with fillings		燙麵炸糕	烫面炸糕	tàngmiàn zhágāo	
Fried sesame egg cake		開口笑	开口笑	kāikǒuxiào	The dish's name literally means "open mouth and laugh/smile".
Fried tofu with egg wrapping		鍋塌豆腐	锅塌豆腐	guōtà dòufǔ	
Jiaoquan		焦圈	焦圈	Jiāoquān	Shaped like a fried doughnut, but has a crispier texture
Steamed egg cake		碗糕	碗糕	wǎngāo	
Sachima		沙琪瑪	沙琪玛	sàqímǎ	Chinese pastry of Manchu origin similar looking to Rice Krispies Treats but different in taste
Yellow pea cake		豌豆黃	豌豆黄	wāndòuhuáng	made from sweetened pea puree

=== Vegetarian ===
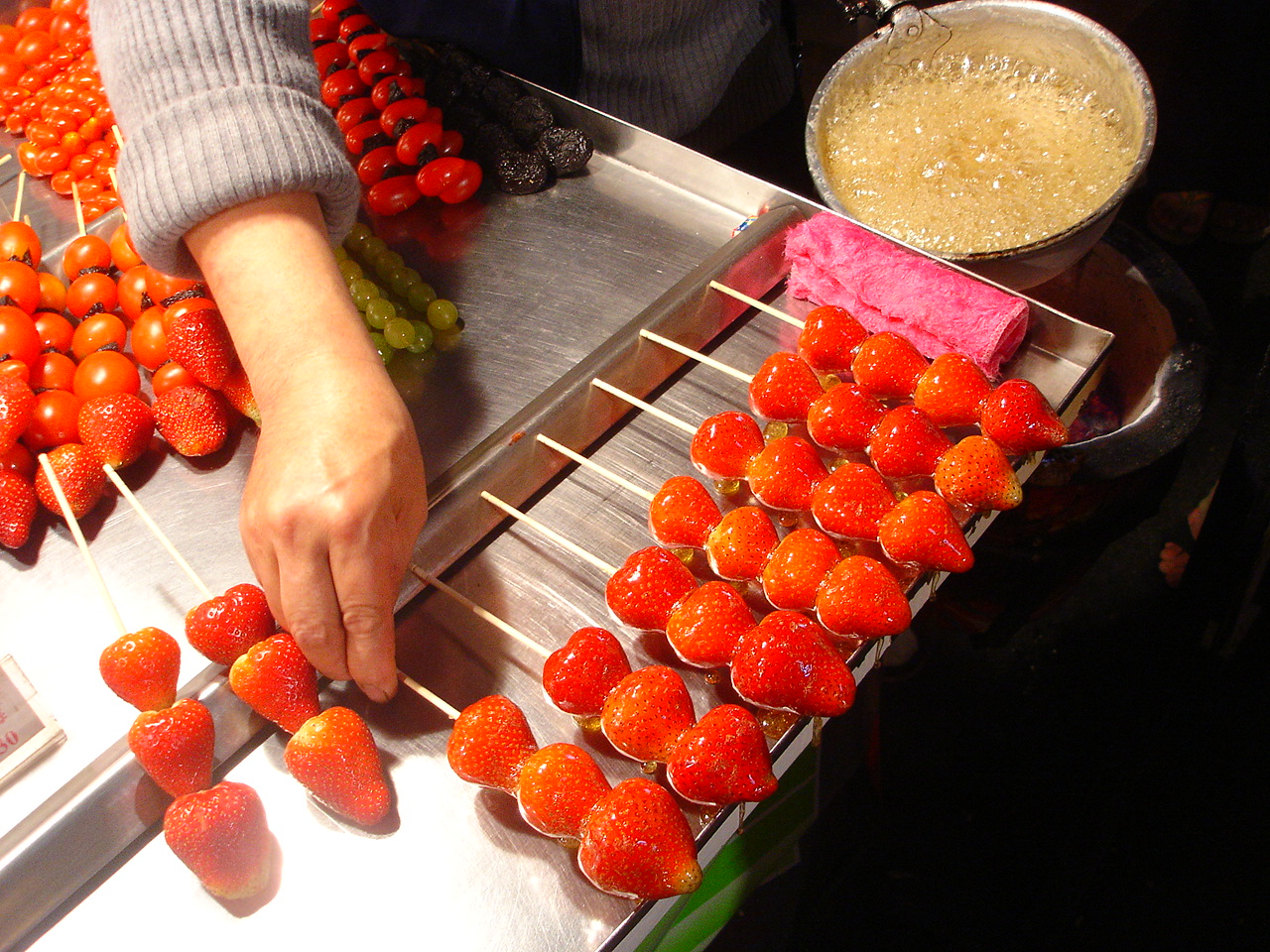
Bingtanghulu

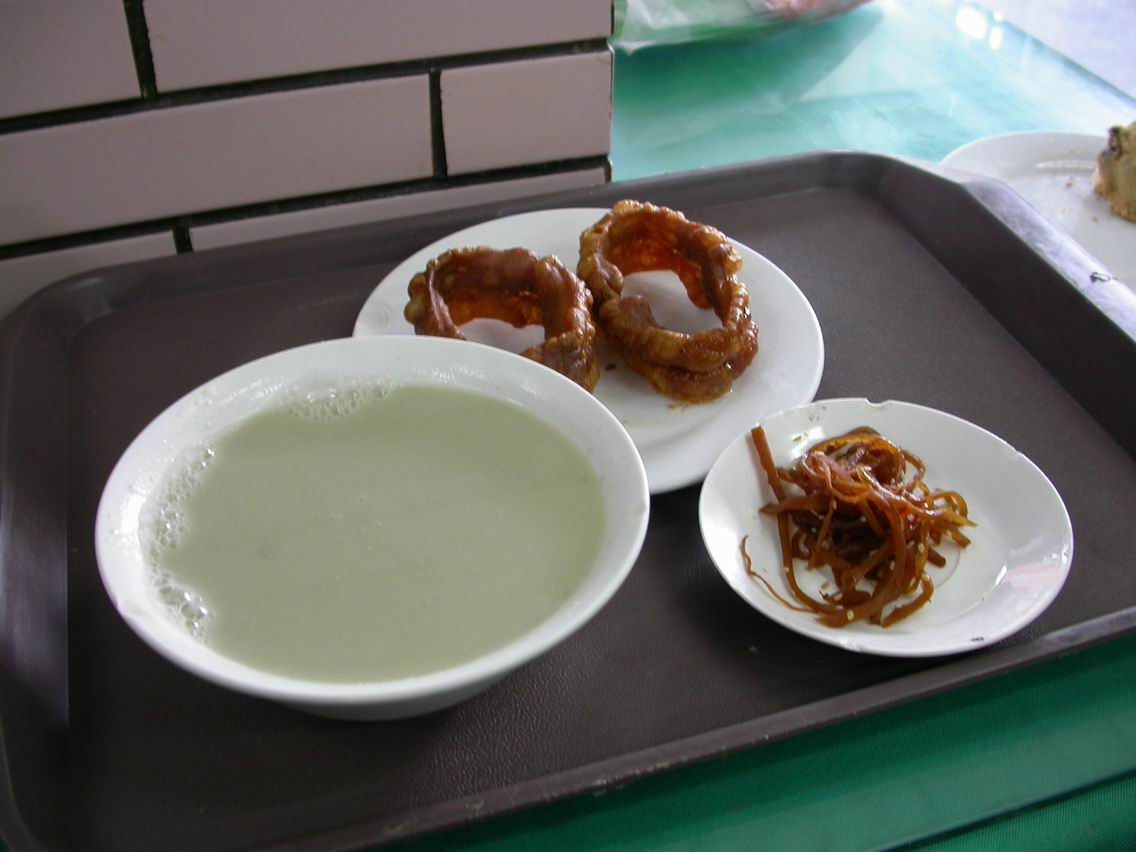
A bowl of douzhi (left) with breakfast items

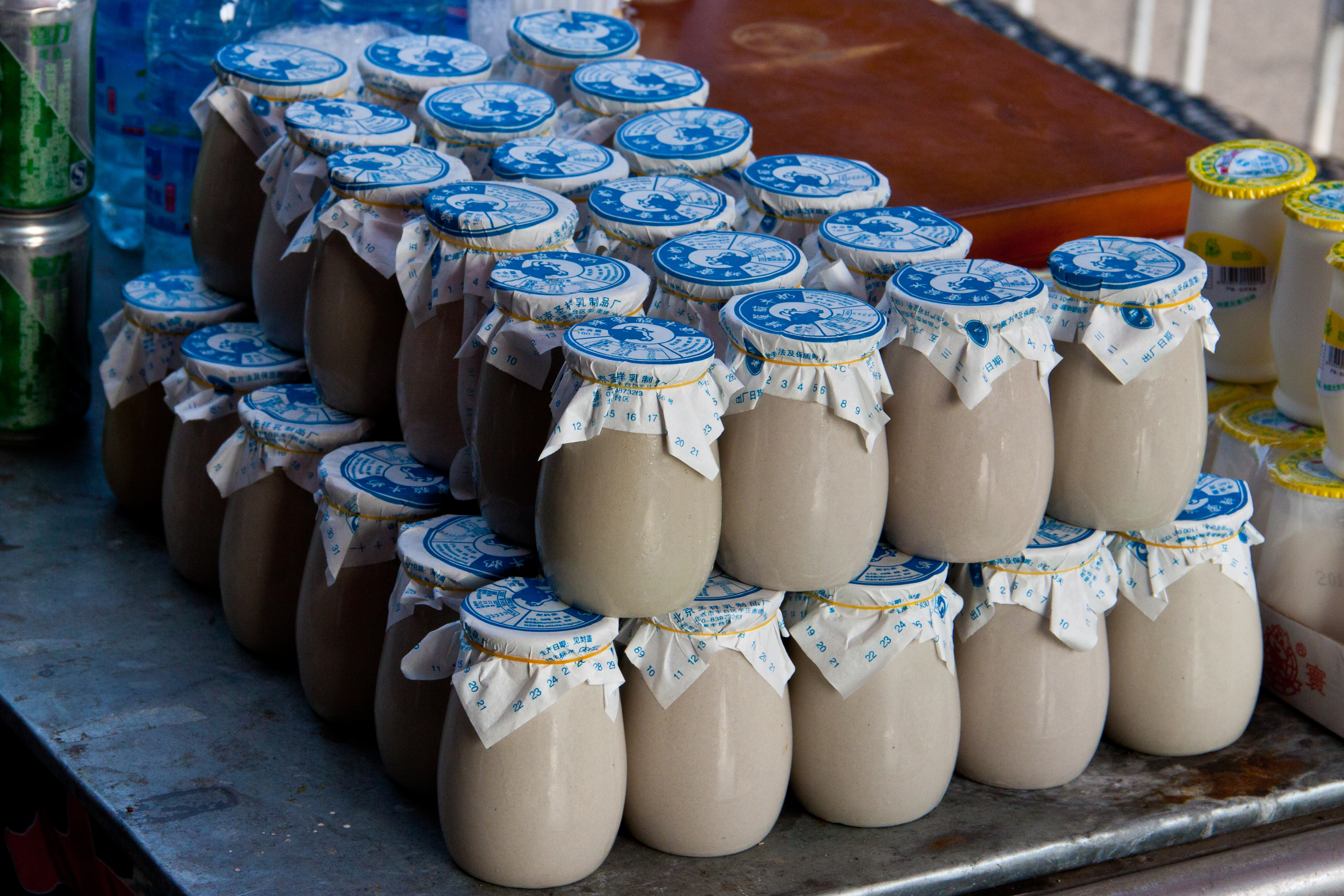
Nai lao (Beijing yogurt)

Liangfen

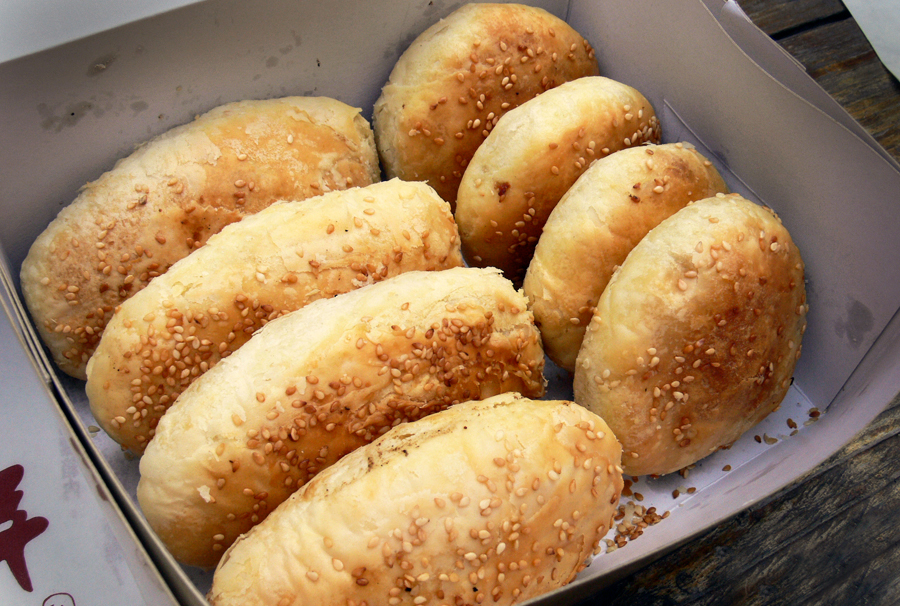
Shaobing

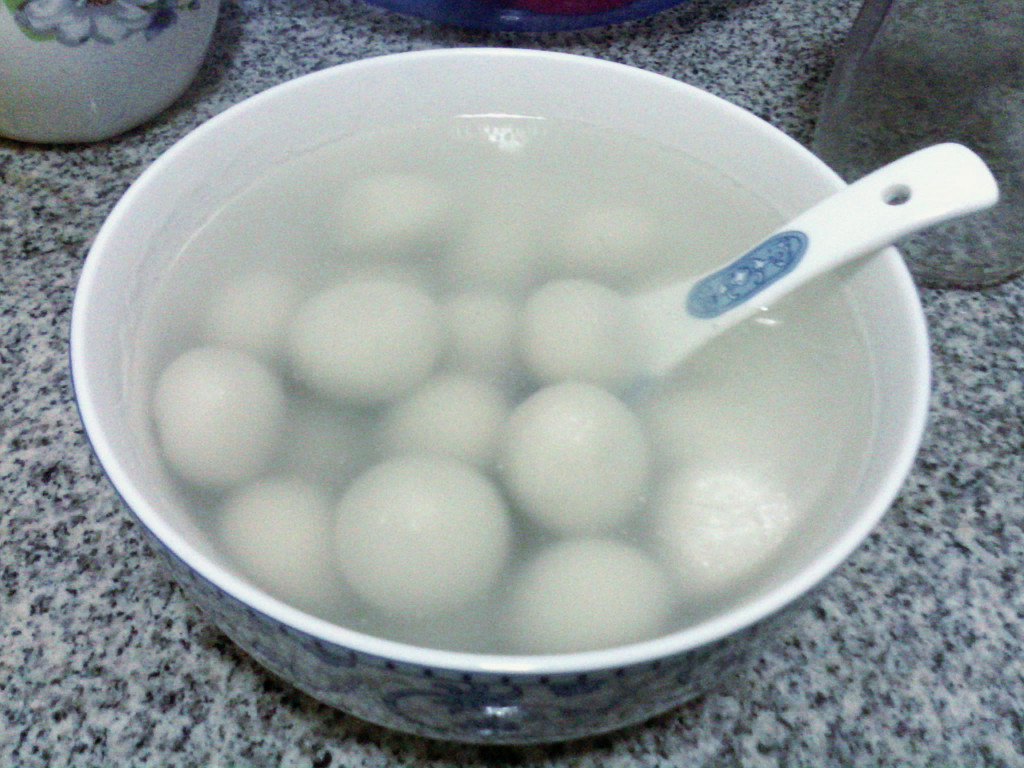
Traditional tangyuan with a sweet sesame filling

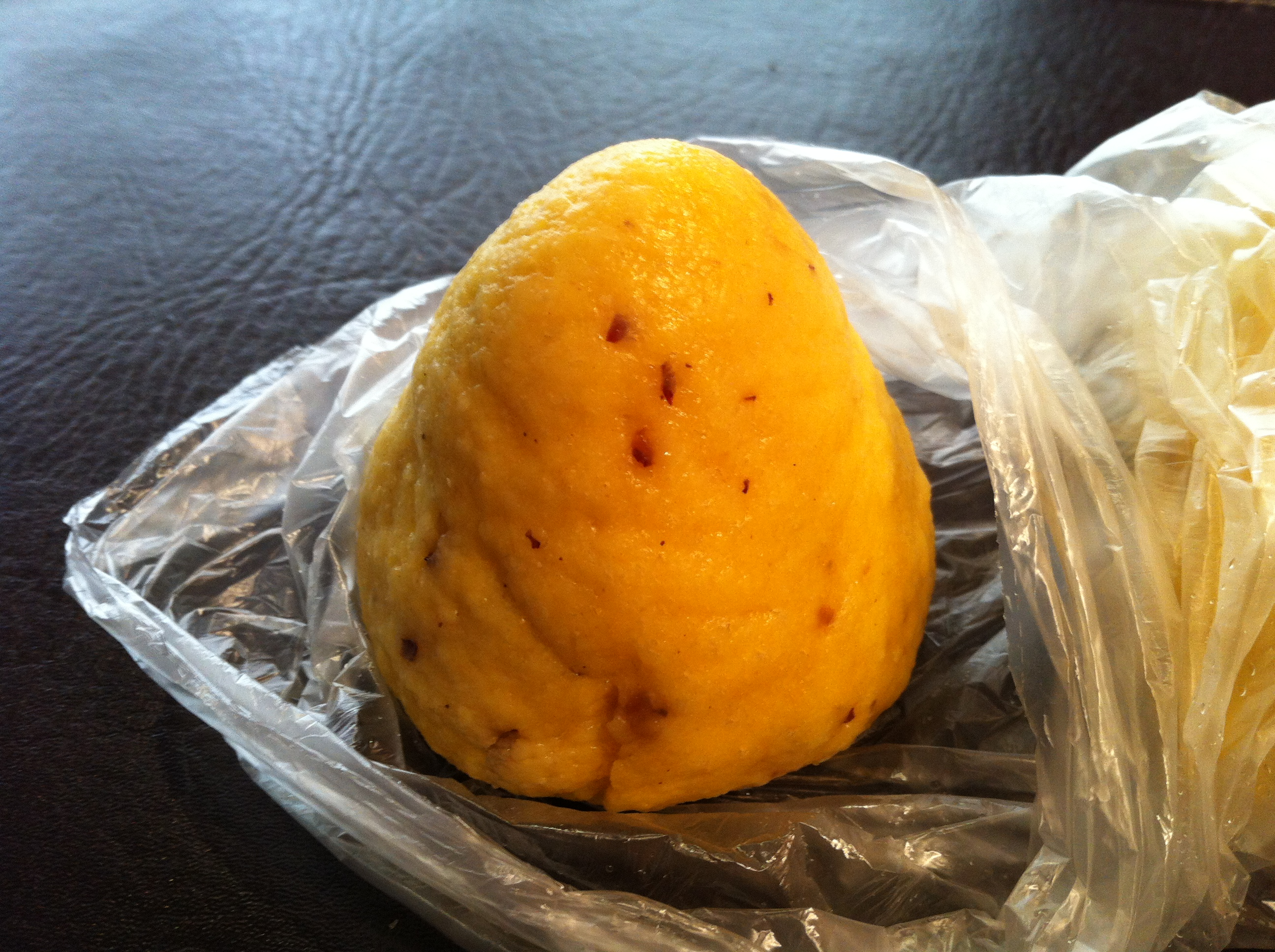
Wotou

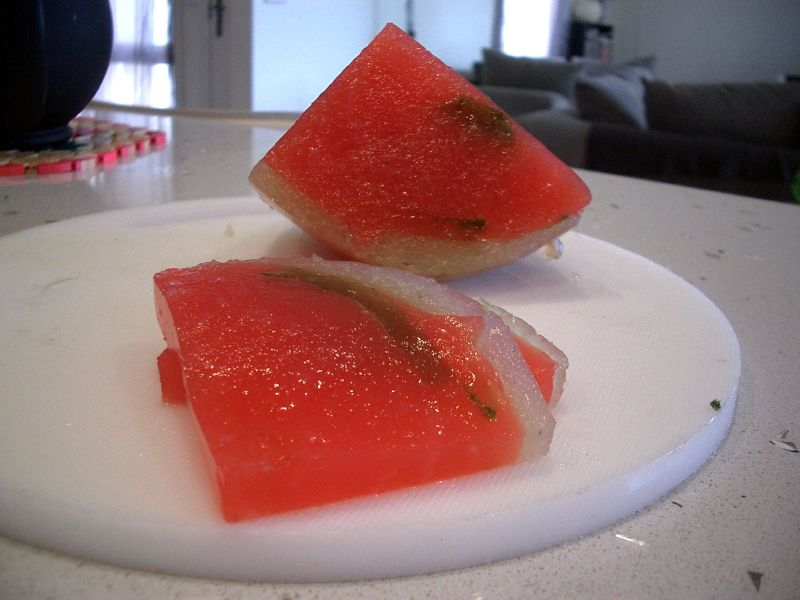
Xi gua lao

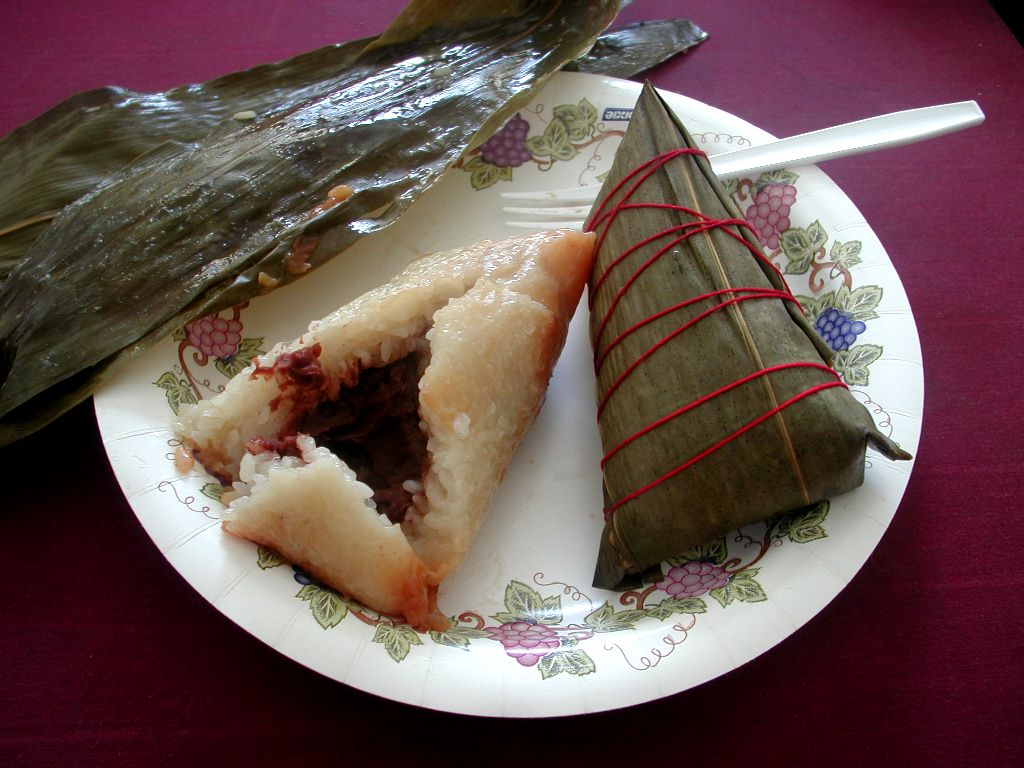
Zongzi both ready to eat (left) and still wrapped in a bamboo leaf (right)

English	Traditional Chinese	Simplified Chinese	Pinyin	Notes
Baked sesame seed cake	燒餅	烧饼	shāobǐng	
Baked wheaten cake	火燒	火烧	huǒshāo	
Bean jelly	涼粉	凉粉	liángfěn	
Bean paste cake	涼糕	凉糕	liánggāo	
Beijing yoghurt	奶酪	奶酪	nǎilào	
Buckwheat cake	扒糕	扒糕	pāgāo	
Cake with bean paste filling	豆餡燒餅	豆馅烧饼	dòuxiàn shāobǐng	
Candied fruit	蜜餞	蜜饯	mìjiàn	
Chatang / Miancha / Youcha	茶湯 / 麵茶 / 油茶	茶汤 / 面茶 / 油茶	chátāng / miànchá / yóuchá	
Chestnut broth	栗子羹	栗子羹	lìzǐ gēng	
Chestnut cake with bean paste	栗子糕	栗子糕	lìzǐ gāo	
Chinese cabbage in mustard	芥末墩	芥末墩	jièmò dūn	
Crisp fritter	麻頁	麻页	máyè	
Crisp fritter with sesame	薄脆	薄脆	báocuì	
Crisp noodle	饊子	馓子	sǎnzǐ	
Crisp thin fritter twist	排叉	排叉	páichā	
Deep-fried dough cake	油餅	油饼	yóubǐng	
Dried fermented mung bean juice	麻豆腐	麻豆腐	má dòufǔ	
Dried soy milk cream in tight rolls	腐竹	腐竹	fǔzhú	
Fermented mung bean juice	豆汁	豆汁	dòuzhī	
Freshwater snail-shaped cake	螺螄轉	螺蛳转	luósī zhuǎn	
Fried cake	炸糕	炸糕	zhágāo	
Fried cake glazed in malt sugar	蜜三刀	蜜三刀	mìsāndāo	
Fried dough twist	麻花	麻花	máhuā	
Fried ring	焦圈	焦圈	jiāoquān	
Fried sugar cake	糖耳朵	糖耳朵	táng ěrduō	
Fuling pancake sandwich	茯苓夾餅	茯苓夹饼	fúlíng jiábǐng	
Glazed / candied Chinese yam	拔絲山藥	拔丝山药	básī shānyào	
Glazed steamed glutinous rice cake	水晶糕	水晶糕	shuǐjīng gāo	
Glazed thin pancake with Chinese yam and jujube stuffing	糖卷果	糖卷果	táng juǎnguǒ	
Glutinous rice ball	艾窩窩	艾窝窝	àiwōwō	
Glutinous rice cake	切糕	切糕	qiēgāo	
Glutinous rice cake roll	卷糕	卷糕	juǎngāo	
Hawthorn cake	京糕	京糕	jīnggāo	
Honeycomb cake	蜂糕	蜂糕	fēnggāo	
Iced fruit	冰果	冰果	bīngguǒ	
Jellied beancurd	豆腐腦	豆腐脑	dòufǔ nǎo	
Kidney bean roll	芸豆卷	芸豆卷	yúndòujuǎn	
Lama cake	喇嘛糕	喇嘛糕	lǎmā gāo	
Millet zongzi	粽子	粽子	zòngzǐ	
Mung bean cake	綠豆糕	绿豆糕	lǜdòu gāo	
Noodle roll	銀絲卷	银丝卷	yínsījuǎn	
Pancake	烙餅	烙饼	làobǐng	
Pease pudding	豌豆黃	豌豆黄	wāndòu huáng	
Preserved fruit	果脯	果脯	guǒpú	
Purple vine cake	藤蘿餅	藤萝饼	téngluó bǐng	
Rice and jujube cake	甑糕	甑糕	zènggāo	
Rice and white kidney bean cake with jujube	盆糕	盆糕	péngāo	
Rice cake with bean paste	花糕	花糕	huāgāo	
Shortening cake	牛舌餅	牛舌饼	níushé bǐng	
Soybean flour cake	豆麵糕	豆面糕	dòumiàn gāo	
Stir fried hawthorn	炒紅果	炒红果	chǎohóngguǒ	
Stir-fried starch knots	燒疙瘩	炒疙瘩	chǎo gēdā	
Suncake	太陽糕	太阳糕	tàiyáng gāo	Not to be confused with Taiwanese suncake, whose name in Chinese is (太阳饼; 太陽餅; tàiyáng bǐng) translates more literally as "sun cookie".
Sweet flour cake	墩餑餑	墩饽饽	dūnbōbō	
Sweet hard flour cake	硬麵餑餑	硬面饽饽	yìngmiàn bōbō	
Sweet potato starch jelly	粉皮	粉皮	fěnpí	
Sweetened baked wheaten cake	糖火燒	糖火烧	táng huǒshāo	
Tanghulu	糖葫蘆	糖葫芦	táng húlú	
Tangyuan	湯圓	汤圆	tāngyuán	
Thin millet flour pancake	煎餅	煎饼	jiānbǐng	
Thin pancake	薄餅	薄饼	báobǐng	
Thin pancake of lard	油皮	油皮	yóupí	
Thousand-layered cake	千層糕	千层糕	qiāncéng gāo	
Veggie roll	春餅卷菜	春饼卷菜	chūnbǐng juǎncài	Not to be confused with spring rolls.
Watermelon jelly	西瓜酪	西瓜酪	xīguā lào	
Wotou	窝头	窝头	wōtóu	
Xing ren cha	杏仁茶	杏仁茶	xìngrén chá	
Xingren doufu	杏仁豆腐	杏仁豆腐	xìngrén dòufǔ	
Yellow cake	黃糕	黄糕	huánggāo	

=== Beijing delicacies ===
- Deep-fried pie
- Soy bean curd

== Restaurants known for Beijing cuisine ==
Numerous traditional restaurants in Beijing are credited with great contributions in the formation of Beijing cuisine, but many of them have gone out of business. However, some of them managed to survive until today, and some of them are:

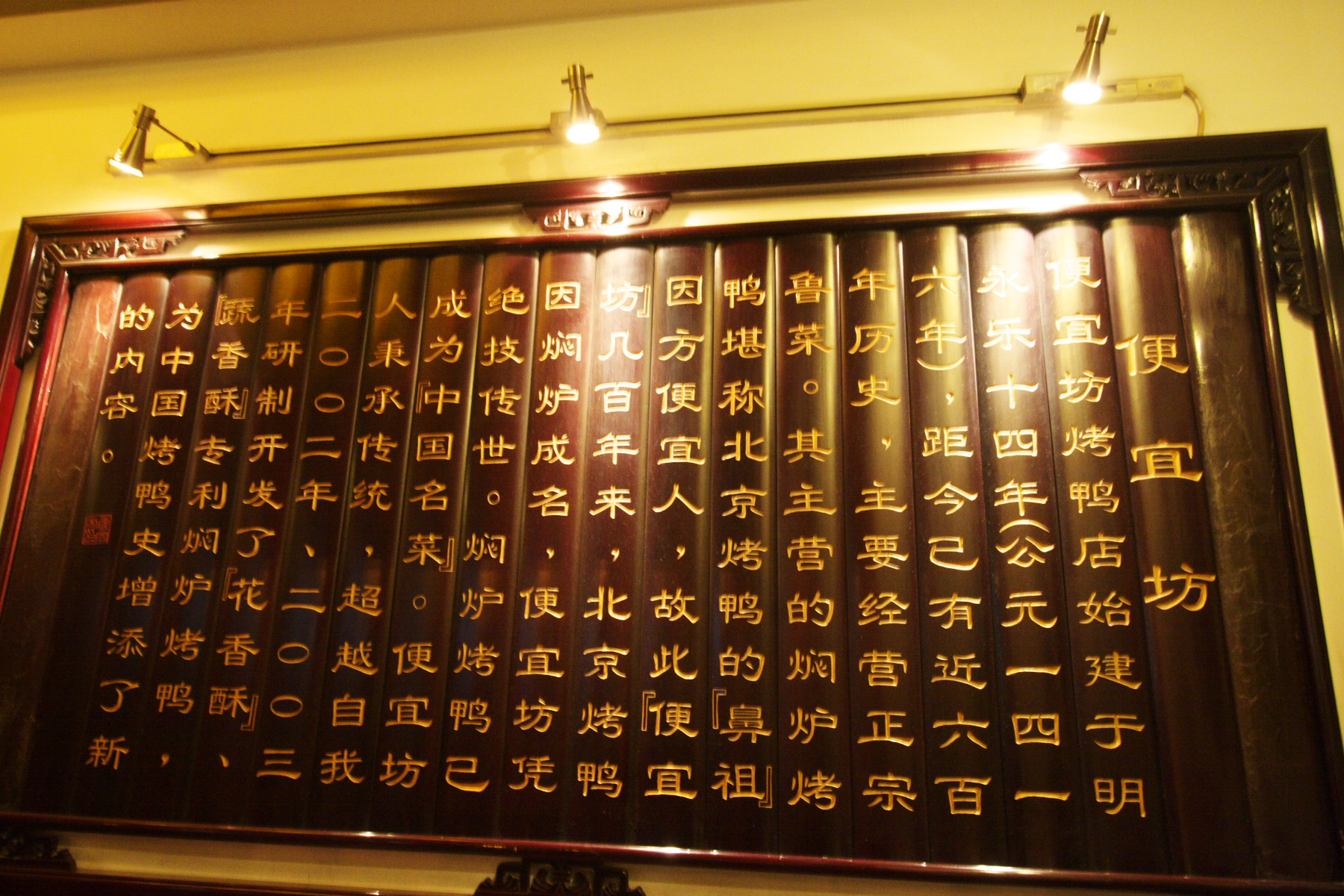
The introduction board at the Bianyifang describes the restaurant's history

- Bai Kui (白魁): established in 1780
- Bao Du Feng (爆肚冯): established in 1881, also known as Ji Sheng Long (金生隆)
- Bianyifang: established in 1416, the oldest surviving restaurant in Beijing
- Cha Tang Li (茶汤李), established in 1858
- Dao Xiang Chun (稻香春): established in 1916
- Dao Xian Cun (稻香村): established in 1895
- De Shun Zhai (大顺斋): established in the early 1870s
- Dong Lai Shun (东来顺): established in 1903
- Dong Xin Shun (东兴顺): also known as Bao Du Zhang (爆肚张), established in 1883
- Du Yi Chu (都一处): established in 1738
- Dou Fu Nao Bai (豆腐脑白): established in 1877, also known as Xi Yu Zhai (西域斋)
- En Yuan Ju (恩元居), established in 1929
- Fang Sheng Zhai (芳生斋), also known as Nai Lao Wei (奶酪魏), established in 1857
- Hong Bin Lou (鸿宾楼): established in 1853 in Tianjin, relocated to Beijing in 1955.
- Jin Sheng Long (金生隆): established in 1846
- Kao Rou Ji (烤肉季): established in 1828
- Kao Rou Wan (烤肉宛): established in 1686
- Liu Bi Ju (六必居) established in 1530
- Liu Quan Ju (柳泉居): established in the late 1560s, the second oldest surviving restaurant in Beijing
- Nan Lai Shun (南来顺): established in 1937
- Nian Gao Qian (年糕钱): established in early 1880s
- Quanjude (全聚德): established in 1864
- Rui Bin Lou (瑞宾楼): originally established in 1876
- Sha Guoo Ju (砂锅居), established in 1741
- Tian Fu Hao (天福号): established in 1738
- Tian Xing Ju (天兴居):, established in 1862
- Tian Yuan Jian Yuan (天源酱园): established in 1869
- Wang Zhi He (王致和): established in 1669
- Wonton Hou (馄饨侯): established in 1949
- Xi De Shun (西德顺): also known as Bao Du Wang (爆肚王), established in 1904
- Xi Lai Shun (西来顺): established in 1930
- Xian Bing Zhou (馅饼周): established in 1910s, also known as Tong Ju Guan (同聚馆)
- Xiao Chang Chen (小肠陈): established in the late 19th century
- Xin Yuan Zhai (信远斋), established in 1740
- Yang Tou Man (羊头马): established in the late 1830s
- Yi Tiao Long (壹条龙): established in 1785
