= Pease porridge (disambiguation) =

Pease porridge is another name for pease pudding, a savory pudding made of boiled legumes.

Pease porridge may also refer to:

- "Pease Porridge Hot", a nursery rhyme
- "Pease Porridge", a monthly column written by Bob Pease
- "Pease Porridge", a song from the De La Soul album De La Soul Is Dead (1991)
