= Porridge (disambiguation) =

Porridge is a dish made by boiling ground, crushed, or chopped starchy plants—typically grain—in water, milk or both.

Porridge may also refer to:

- Porridge (1974 TV series), a British situational comedy set in a prison
- Porridge (film), a 1979 film derived from the 1974 TV series
- Porridge (2016 TV series), a sequel series to the original situational comedy series

== See also ==
- Pease porridge or pease pudding, a foodstuff made from split peas
- "Pease Porridge Hot", a nursery rhyme
- "Sweet Porridge", a German fairy tale recorded by the Brothers Grimm
- List of porridges
