= Chao hongguo =

Traditional dish in Beijing cuisine

- Type: Pastry
- Place of origin: China
- Region or state: Beijing
- Main ingredients: Chinese hawthorn

Stir-fried hawthorn (Chinese: 炒红果; pinyin: chǎo hóngguǒ; lit. 'stir-fried red fruit') is a traditional dish of Beijing cuisine, made from Chinese hawthorn fruits.

Another traditional dish of Beijing cuisine, hawthorn yogurt (hongguolao, 红果酪), utilizes stir-fried Chinese hawthorn fruits, as its main ingredient by adding it to Nai Lao.

== See also ==
- Tanghulu
