= Luzhu huoshao =

Chinese pork offal dish

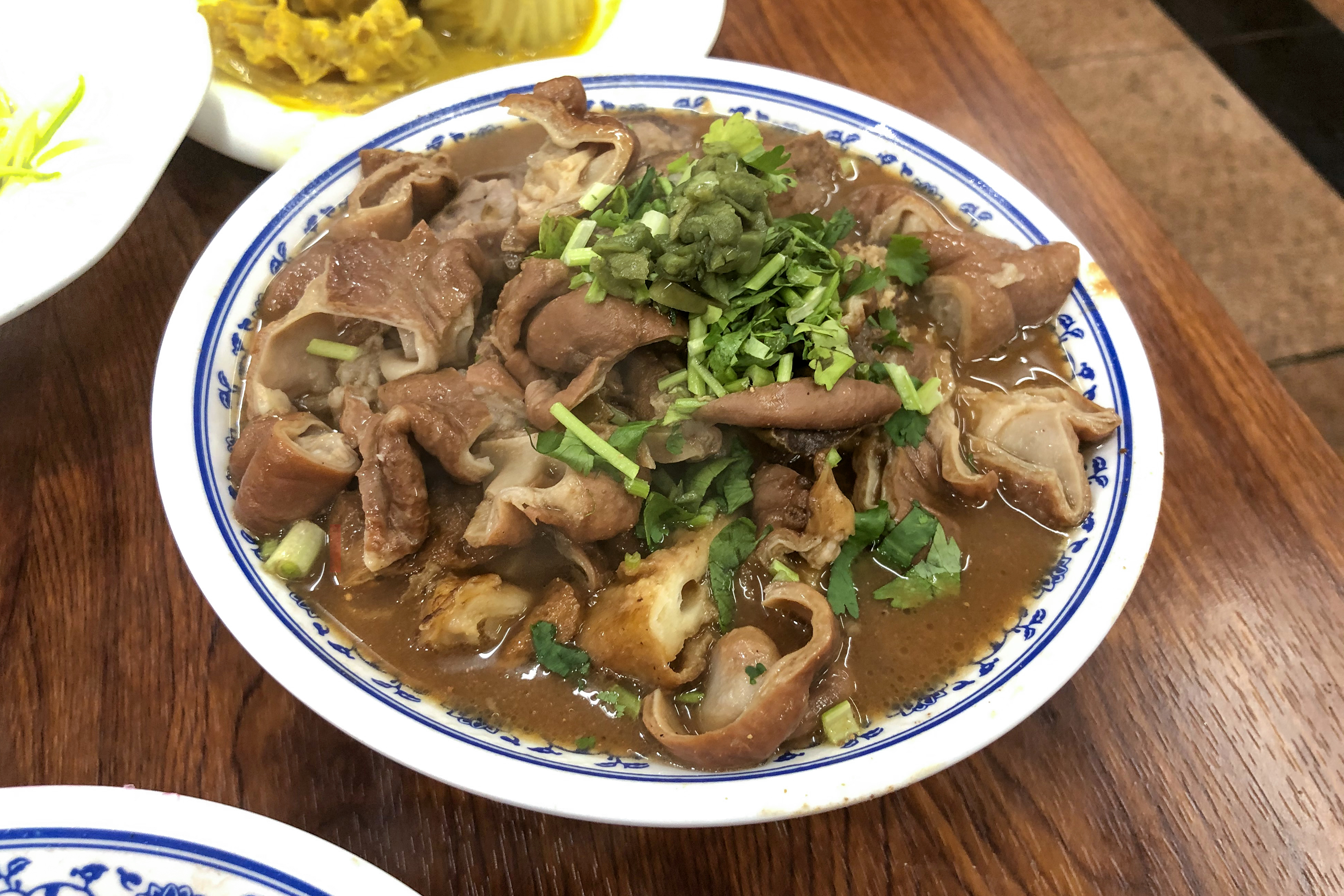
- "Luzhu huoshao" served in a restaurant in Maliandao, Beijing
- Alternative names: Lu zhu
- Type: Street food
- Place of origin: China
- Region or state: Beijing
- Main ingredients: Pork lung, Pork belly or Fatback, Pork intestines, Pork liver, Tofu, Bing (bread)

Luzhu huoshao (Chinese: 卤煮火烧; pinyin: lúzhǔ huǒshāo; lit. 'pork stew with bread') is a popular traditional Beijing street food. Long considered a luxury, the cuisine is especially prevalent in Beijing. The main ingredients are pork, pork lung, pork intestines, pork liver, tofu, and some may add fermented bean curd or chives sauce. It is served with bing bread.

== Origin and history ==
The origins of luzhu huoshao can be traced back to the Qing dynasty as a palace food in Peking. According to legends, "su zao rou" (Chinese: 蘇造肉) was a dish invented by Zhang Dongguan as a tribute for Qianlong Emperor during one of Qianlong' inspection to Suzhou around 1970 and it was the origin of luzhu huoshao. Zhang Dongguan's cooking style involved unique combinations of medicinal herbs and spices in cooking. His technique impressed the emperor, and Zhang eventually became the lead cook in the palace. Over time, the recipe of "su zao rou" spread beyond the walls of palace to the rest of Beijing, and many people tried to imitate the recipe to eat like an emperor. However the key ingredient of the dish, pork belly, was not very affordable for many people at that time. Pork lung, intestines and many other types of pork offal were used as a substitute for pork belly in order to make the most people able to afford this dish. Hence, luzhu huoshao was formed over generations, and since then, it has become one of the most well-known Beijing street food, and still in fashion nowadays.

== Popularity ==
Many restaurants that sell luzhu huoshao can still be found in Beijing and overseas. Much like stinky tofu, it shares a strong odor that can make it challenging to eat. Luzhu huoshao is among the famous Beijing traditional street foods.

Cui Daiyuan (崔岱远), a contemporary writer from Beijing, wrote in his book "The flavor of Beijing" (京味儿) that luzhu huoshao is "a food that allows the poor people to satisfy their cravings" (穷人解馋的玩意).

== Characteristics ==
There are certain characteristics that are expected from a well made luzhu huoshao, which also make it a unique Beijing street food. Similar to baodu, the meat in a well-made luzhu huoshao is supposed to be reasonably chewy, neither too tough nor falling apart. The dish is known for having an unappetizing appearance, but the taste is considered rather complex and savory due to the complex mixes of herb supplemented with soy sauce. The huoshao (Bing (bread)) is soaked in the soup to flavor it. Pork offal usually has a strong odor, but as luzhu huoshao is freshly made, a proper dish should lack any offensive taste or smell.

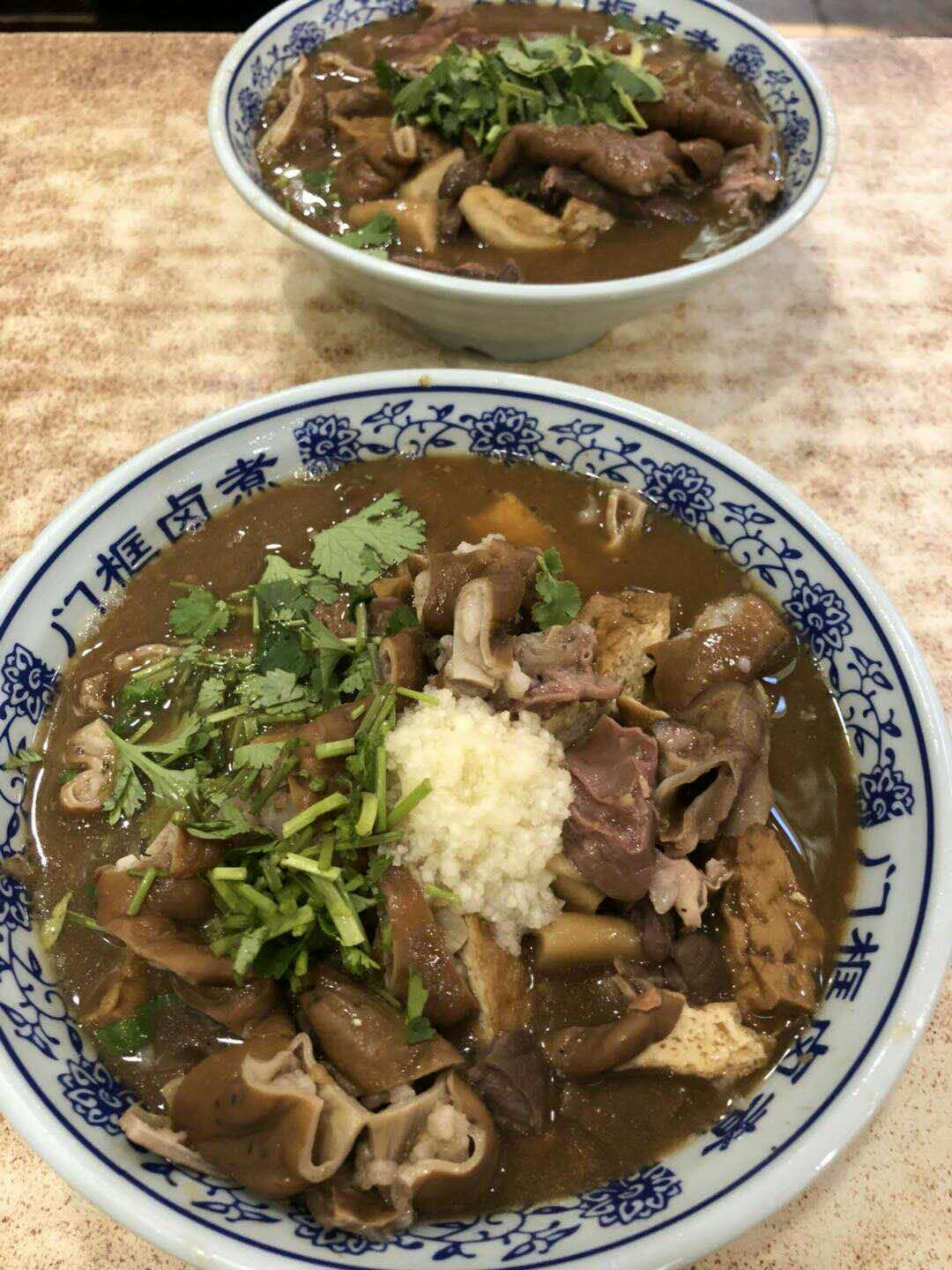
Luzhuhuoshao

== See also ==
- Chinese cuisine
- Beijing cuisine
