= Luzhu =

Luzhu may refer to:

- Luzhu District, Taoyuan (蘆竹區), Taiwan
- Lujhu District, Kaohsiung (路竹區), Taiwan
- Luzhu, Fuyang, Zhejiang (渌渚镇), town in Fuyang, Zhejiang, People's Republic of China

== See also ==
- Lüzhu
- Luzhu huoshao
