= Mizhi hulu =

Traditional dish in Beijing cuisine

Mizhi hulu (Chinese: 蜜汁葫芦; lit. 'honey juice calabash') is a popular traditional dish in Beijing cuisine consisting of pork fat with a flour wrapping glazed in honey.

The traditional preparation method of this dish begins with mixing the pork fat with flour and then rolling it into circular forms. Flour is mixed with warm water to form spheres, which are then soaked in boiling water. After the flour sphere is taken out of the boiling water, the process is repeated three times, and finally they are mixed with eggs to form a paste. The pork fat covered with flour is then cut into pieces and each piece is covered with the paste made of flour and egg, and deep fried. Honey is stewed until its colour turns dark, then the fried pork fat spheres covered with paste are dipped into the honey, and the dish is served. Before serving, other ingredients such as sugar can be added.

Usually, for every three hundred grams of pork fat, two hundred grams of honey and two eggs are used. Due to its high sugar content and the usage of pork fat, it is considered unhealthy and thus not commonly prepared or consumed.
