= Luosi zhuan =

Luosi zhuan (simplified Chinese: 螺蛳转; traditional Chinese: 螺螄轉; pinyin: luósīzhuǎn; lit. 'freshwater snail roll') is a traditional dish of Beijing cuisine.

== Preparation ==
The traditional culinary method of this dish begins with the preparation of flour, sesame paste, oil, salt, baking soda and Sichuan pepper. The ingredients are mixed together and cut into small pieces. The small pieces of dough would be pressed into flat pieces and sesame paste would be applied and then rolled together, compressed, and cut open from the middle. The dough would be held at one end and twisted at the other end, and then pressed down. The dish is then baked.
