= Bing wan =

Dessert in Beijing cuisine

Bing wan (Chinese: 冰碗; pinyin: bīng wǎn; lit. 'ice bowl') is a traditional dessert dish of Beijing cuisine. The main ingredients of this dish include lotus root slices, almonds, walnuts, uncored lotus seed, and sugar. The lotus root, lotus seeds, almonds and walnuts are then steamed. The sugar is mixed with water and then boiled to become syrup. The steamed ingredients are placed on a bowl (sometimes a lotus leaf is placed at the bottom of the bowl as garnish) with syrup poured on top and then cooled by ice or a refrigerator and served cold. It was once eaten by Qing dynasty royalty. The dish is also called bing guo (冰果, lit. "iced fruit"), da bing wan (大冰碗, lit. "big ice bowl"), and hexian'er (河鮮兒, 河鲜儿, lit. "river delicacy"). Xu Ke wrote that the dish was followed by four dishes of hot meat.
