= Qingtang wanzi =

Qingtang wanzi (Chinese: 清汤丸子; pinyin: qīngtāng wánzi) is a traditional meatball soup found in Beijing cuisine.

== Preparation ==
Traditionally, this dish includes the main ingredients: 300 grams (11 oz) of tenderloin, 50 grams (1.8 oz) of egg white, wood ear, oil, cooking wine, sesame oil, cilantro, green onion, and ginger.

The tenderloin, ginger and green onions are minced and made into balls by mixing with egg whites. The meatballs are boiled until they float to the surface and then taken out and served with coriander and sesame oil. Vegetables are served together with meatballs.
