= Douzhi =

Fermented beverage made from mung beans

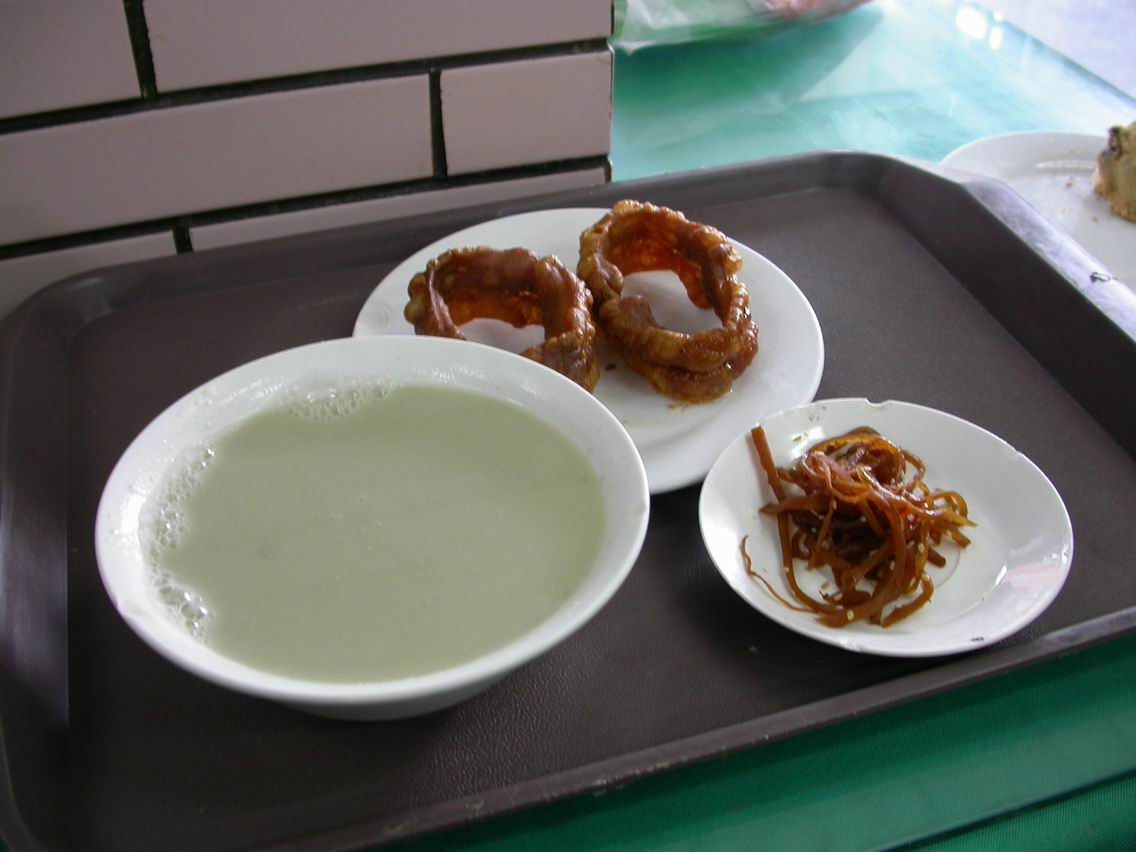
A bowl of Douzhi (left) with jiaoquan and preserved vegetable

Douzhi (Chinese: 豆汁; pinyin: dòuzhī, lit. 'mung bean juice') is a traditional fermented drink in Beijing cuisine similar to soy milk, with a recorded history of over 300 years. Made as a byproduct of cellophane noodle production, it has a light gray color and a distinct, slightly sour smell, with hints of green vegetables and cooked potatoes.

== Historical background and cultural significance ==
Douzhi originated during the Liao and Song dynasties, when Beijing was a key center in northern China. During this period, residents of Beijing, including both royal family members and Han officials, enjoyed Douzhi as a breakfast staple. By the Qing dynasty, Douzhi's popularity had even reached the imperial court. Records from the Qianlong era note an official report to the emperor suggesting that Douzhi be inspected for cleanliness, and if deemed suitable, to serve it within the palace.

Douzhi is an icon of Beijingese culture. Douzhi is widely considered to be a breakfast food in modern Beijing, usually served alongside jiaoquan (焦圈), ring-shaped pieces of fried dough and xiancai (咸菜), salted pickled vegetables. Although Douzhi is commonly favored among locals, non-local visitors find Douzhi dislikable due to its sour and pungent taste attributed to the fermentation process during its production. In 2007, Douzhi was recognized as a cultural heritage in Beijing by the Beijing intangible cultural heritage program.

== Making process ==
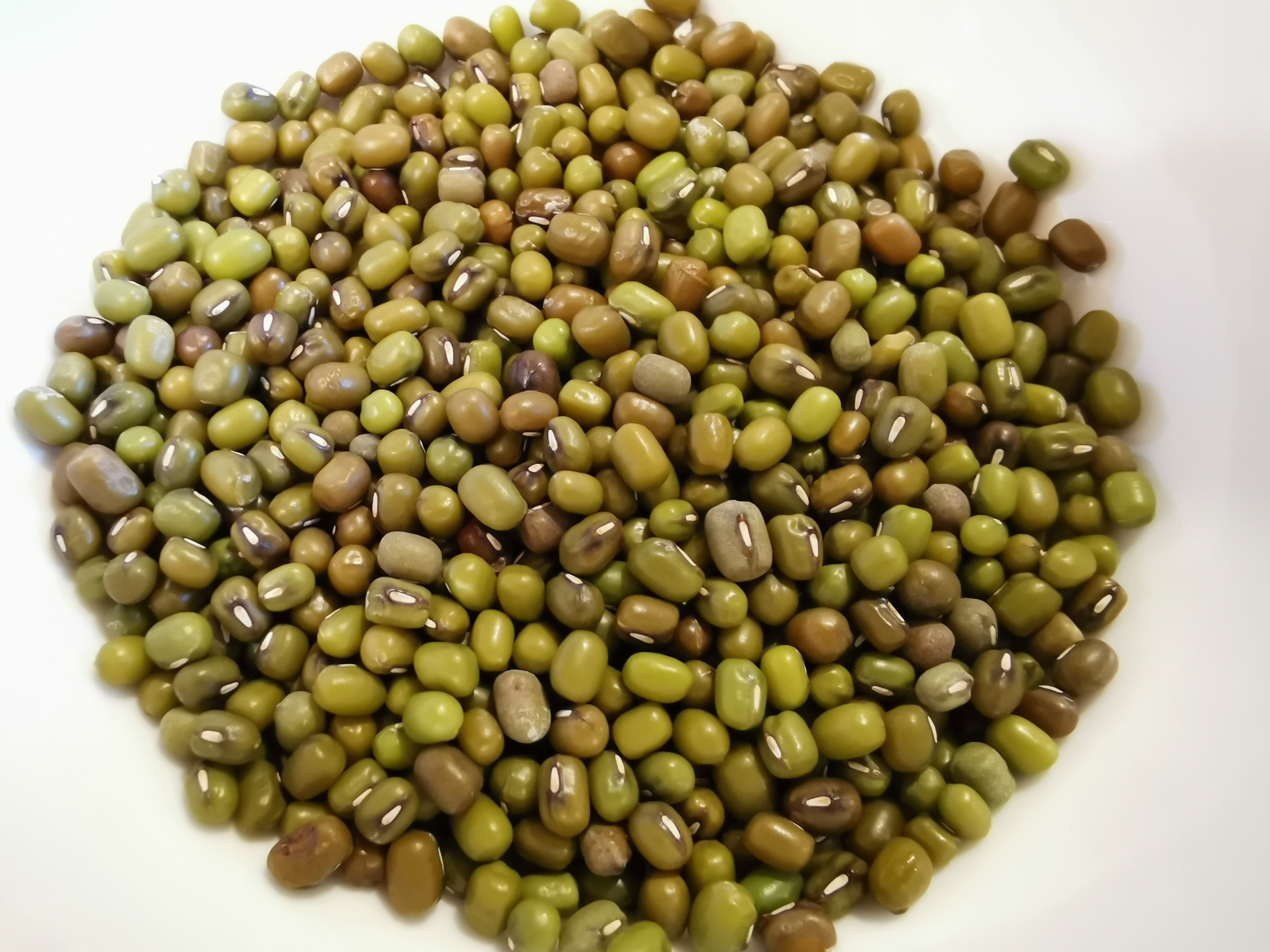
Mung beans selected

The process of making Douzhi is as follows:

1. Selecting mung beans: The process begins with selecting high-quality mung beans, as their quality greatly influences the final taste. The best mung beans are plump and bright green, ensuring that the resulting Douzhi has a strong bean aroma and a smooth texture.
2. Fermentation: Fermentation is the most critical step in making Douzhi. After grinding the mung beans and mixing them with water, the mixture is left to ferment naturally in a warm environment. The duration of fermentation affects the flavor of the drink, with longer fermentation producing a more pronounced, tangy taste.
3. Filtering: After fermentation, the bean pulp is separated from the liquid. This is done using a fine cloth to ensure a smooth, impurity-free texture. The filtered Douzhi appears pale yellow and carries a distinct sour aroma. It can be consumed as is or boiled for a richer flavor.
4. Boiling: The filtered Douzhi is then poured into a large pot and brought to a gentle boil. This step not only intensifies the flavor but also reduces the sourness to a more balanced level. Boiling also helps sterilize the drink, making it safer and more enjoyable to consume.

== Nutrition ==
Douzhi is made from mung beans, which contain protein, dietary fiber, vitamins and minerals, making them a beneficial component of a balanced diet. The drink also contains bioactive compounds, including polyphenols and peptides, which are associated with antioxidant properties. It also supports digestion.
