= Ruanzha liji =

Chinese pork dish

Ruanzha liji (Chinese: 软炸里脊; pinyin: ruǎnzhàlǐjí) is a dish in Beijing cuisine consisting of fried pork tenderloin strips.

The dish is prepared by marinating the tenderloin slices in rice wine and salt, followed by coating it in an egg white-flour mix. The slices are then fried in pork fat and served with sesame oil. Due to the use of pork fat, the dish is generally considered unhealthy and the vegetable oil has been used as an alternative, though some diners consider this less tasty.

== See also ==
- List of pork dishes
