= Wandouhuang =

Traditional Chinese snack food

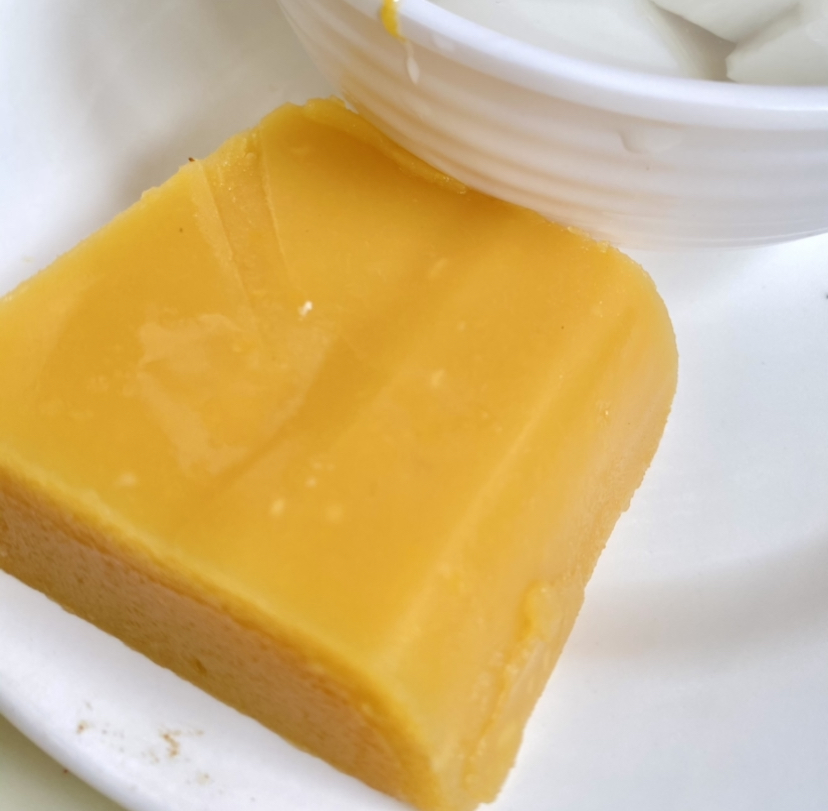
- Alternative names: wandouhuangr (豌豆黄儿)
- Type: Pastry
- Place of origin: China
- Region or state: Beijing
- Main ingredients: Pea, water, sugar

Wandouhuang (simplified Chinese: 豌豆黄; traditional Chinese: 豌豆黃; Pinyin: wāndòuhuáng), also called wandouhuangr (豌豆黄儿), is a traditional snack or dessert in China. It was popular among the Chinese Han population, and then spread into the Forbidden City during the Qing Dynasty. Wandouhuang has been famous in Beijing since the Ming Dynasty and became one of Beijing's traditional snacks.

Wandouhuang is a kind of ginger- or saffron-colored paste-like cake with a slightly sweet taste that is considered light and refreshing. The main ingredients are yellow pea or yellow pea flour, water, and sugar. Wandouhuang is a classic spring product, so it was common to see in Spring Temple Fair in the past but today it is available during all seasons in restaurants across China.

== Etymology ==
Wandou is the Chinese name for peas. Huang means yellow in Chinese.

== History ==
=== Custom ===
In ancient China, vendors sold Wandouhuang during Shangsi Festival (March 3 in the lunar calendar), during which people travel together to have a Spring break. At that time, most people were more likely to go to temples to pray for protection and blessings from the Chinese God. Many elaborate fairs were held in the regions surrounding the local temples. Wandouhuang came into people's view through vendors. Because its taste won the favor of the public, eating Wandouhuang in Shangsi Festival became a custom in ancient China. It is a traditional folk snack among Han people.

=== Legend ===
During Qing Dynasty, one day Empress Dowager Cixi, vacationing in the palace of Beihai, heard the sounds of a gong and shouting in the street. Curious, she asked her servants to find out what was happening. The servants told her the noise was from vendors selling wandouhuang and yundoujuan, specialties of the area. Cixi had the vendors called in to show her these desserts. After tasting them, Cixi was full of praise for these folk snacks and asked the vendors to work in the royal kitchen of the Forbidden City and only cook those desserts for her. When Wandouhuang came into the Forbidden City, the chef there improved the recipe and refined the materials. Therefore, there are two versions of the recipe for Wandouhuang: one is for Cixi, and the other one is for the folk version.

== Ingredients ==
Wandouhuang consists of peas or pea flour, water, and sugar. By using a complicated method, peas are turned into a purée, which can blend with water and sugar. As a result, the taste of Wandouhuang is delicate.
