= Jiaoquan =

Fried snack food

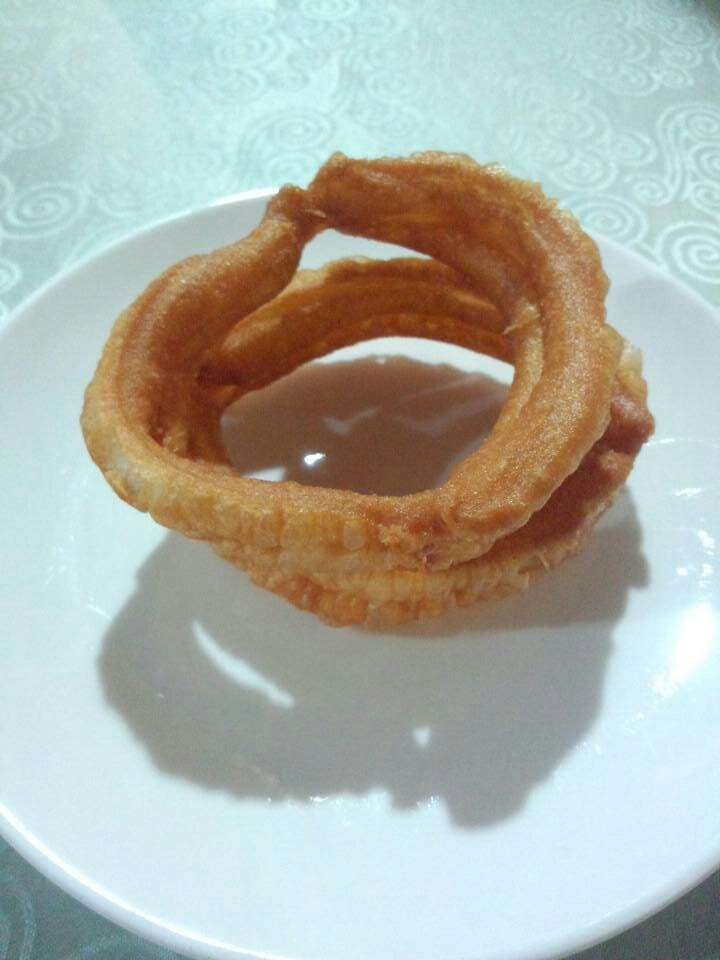

Jiao quan (Chinese: 焦圈; pinyin: jiāoquān; or xiaoyougui; also called fried ring) is a dish from Beijing cuisine. It has a golden color and is shaped like a bracelet. It feels crispy and crunchy when eaten. The unique taste of it is very popular in Beijing cuisine. People usually eat jiaoquan with shaobing and douzhi.

Jiao quan is a special Beijing local food. The shape of it is like a doughnut, but it has a crispier texture.
