= Baodu =

Chinese halal tripe dish

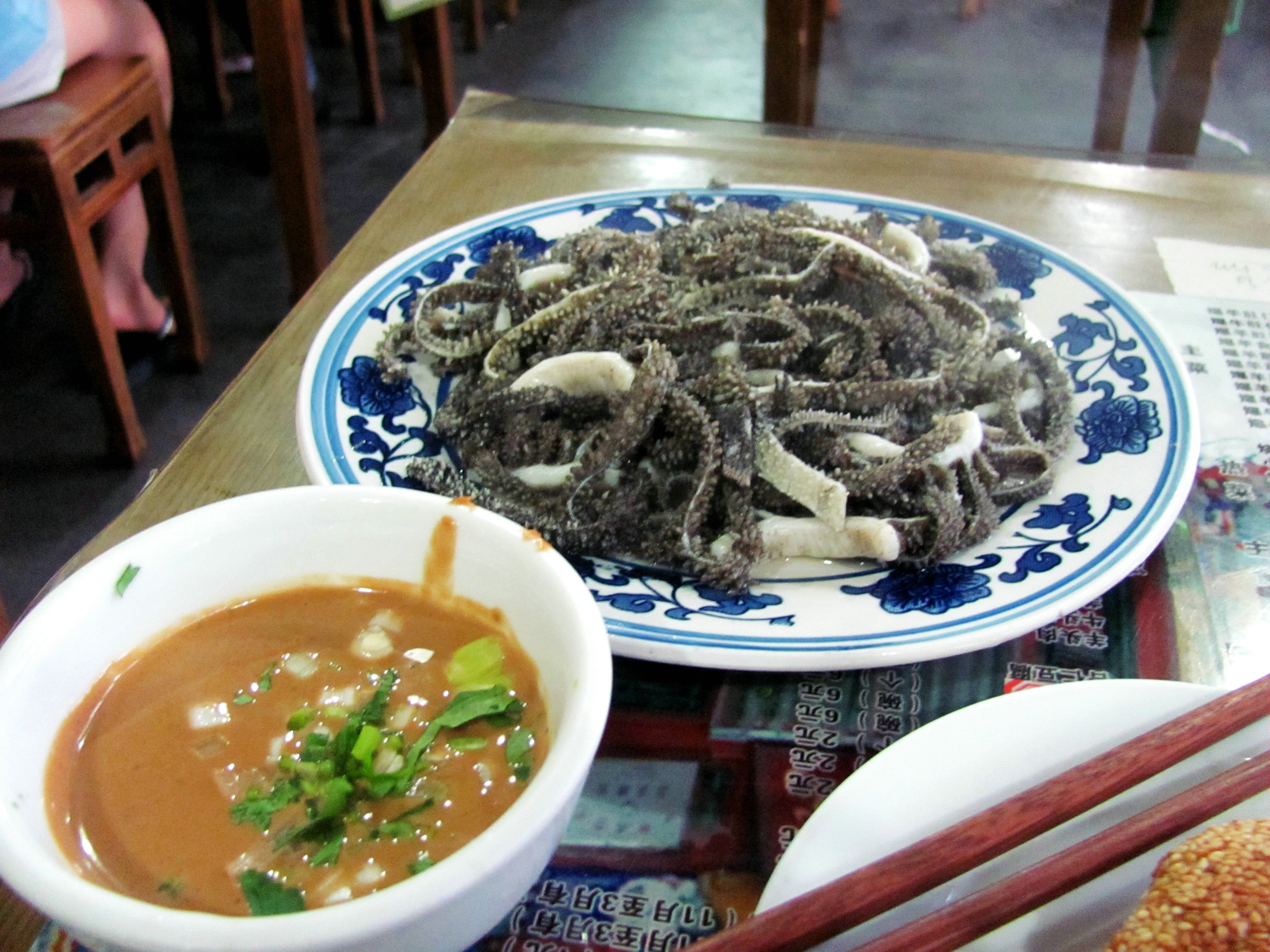
Bao du

Baodu (Chinese: 爆肚; pinyin: bàodǔ) is a halal tripe dish that is part of Beijing cuisine. It is traditionally prepared by the Muslim Hui people.

== History ==
It was first recorded in the Qing dynasty. There are many restaurants and street peddlers selling it in Beijing, such as Baodu Feng, a traditional and well-known restaurant established in 1881.

== Description ==
Traditionally, customers at a baodu restaurant can order various different cuts of lamb or beef tripe to their liking.

=== Cuts ===
- Beef tripe (mainly divided into four parts)
  1. 百叶: Rumen (black)
  2. 百叶尖儿: Omasum (white)
  3. 肚仁儿
  4. 厚头
- Lamb tripe (mainly divided into nine parts; as lamb is more tender than beef, more cuts can be used)
  1. 食信儿: Weasand (Oesophagus)
  2. 肚板儿: Rumen
  3. 肚领儿: An uplift of the rumen
  4. 肚仁儿
  5. 肚芯儿
  6. 葫芦: Reticulum (or second stomach)
  7. 散丹: Omasum
  8. 蘑菇：Reticulorumen
  9. 蘑菇头: The bottom of the reticulorumen

=== Cooking techniques ===
The dish is made of fresh beef or lamb tripe which is first cut into slices and then simply blanched in boiling water rapidly. Despite its simplicity, the dish is a test of a cook's ability, requiring experience and advanced cooking skills to control cooking time and heat to prevent the tripe from toughening.

== Seasoning ==
The seasoning is mainly a mixture of jiang doufu, sesame paste, and a savory paste made from the flowers of Chinese chives. Additionally, ingredients such as soy sauce, vinegar, coriander, or chopped green onion can be added according to taste.
