= Yundou juan =

Traditional Chinese dish

Yundou juan (Chinese: 芸豆卷; pinyin: yúndòujuǎn; lit. 'kidney bean rolls') is a mashed kidney bean roll that is a traditional snack in Beijing cuisine. It is said to have been a favorite dessert of Empress Cixi.

After the water is heated to the boiling point, the kidney beans would then be boiled in the hot water for at least an hour and then steamed for at least twenty minutes afterward.

The kidney beans would then be crushed and compressed into linear mash/paste form with diameter of 3.5 cm. The mash/paste would then be placed on a piece of wet cloth and formed into rectangular shape with knife, and a layer of bean paste is placed on top of the rectangular shaped kidney bean mash/paste, and rolled together. When serving, the resulting roll would be cut into smaller pieces.

== See also ==
- Khandvi (food)
- Swiss roll
- List of legume dishes
