= Jin Sheng Long =

Traditional restaurant in Beijing, China

Jin Sheng Long (Chinese: 金生隆; pinyin: Jīn Shēng Lóng), also called Baodu Feng (Chinese: 爆肚冯; lit. 'Feng's baodu'), is a historic traditional restaurant in Beijing, China. It was founded by Feng Tianjie, a Hui Muslim chef from Shandong, during the reign of the Guangxu Emperor (r. 1875–1908) in the Qing dynasty.

The first outlet was founded in Menkuang Hutong, at the Zhengyangmen Dashilan. It is now a chain restaurant with numerous outlets. It was registered by the Beijing National Trademark Office in 1995.

Jin Sheng Long is known for its baodu (a halal tripe dish). In 2000, its dish baodu ren sanpin (爆肚仁三品) was voted one of the 46 "Famous Dishes of China".
