= Misandao =

Fried cake glazed in malt sugar

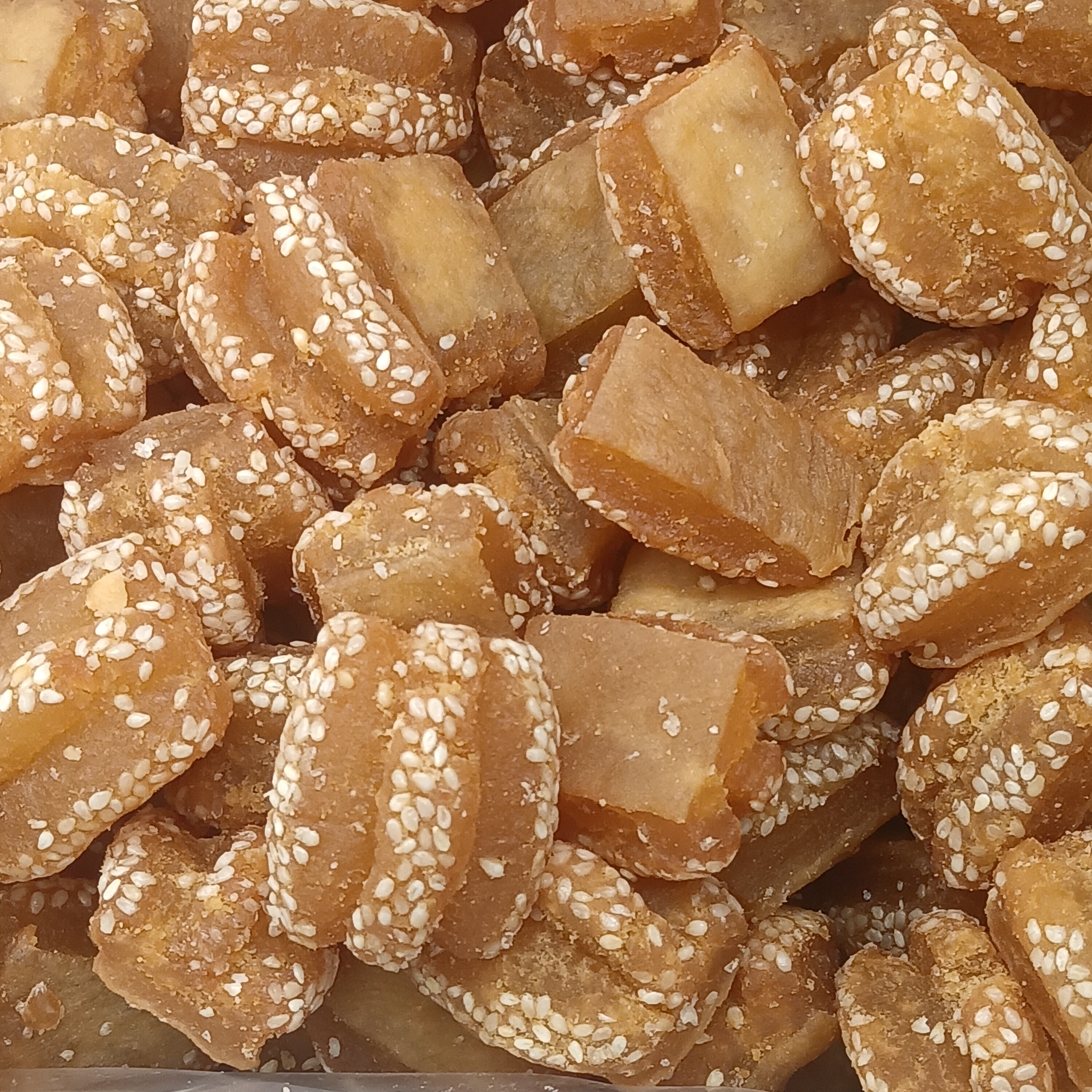
- Type: Pastry
- Place of origin: China
- Main ingredients: Flour, baking soda, vegetable oil, maltose

Misandao (Chinese: 蜜三刀; pinyin: mìsāndāo; lit. 'three cuts of honey') is a fried cake glazed in malt sugar and is a traditional Song dynasty era dish of Xuzhou cuisine.

== Preparation ==
The basic ingredients of this dish are flour, baking soda, and vegetable oil. About 25% of the flour is mixed with water, baking soda, and malt sugar for fermentation, forming the outside skin. The remaining flour is mixed evenly with water, becoming the inner part. Both types of dough would then be compressed into rectangular shapes and stacked. This sandwiched dough is then compressed and cut into long strips, before being folded and cut three times into four equal parts. The resulting dough pieces are then fried in vegetable oil. Once the fried dough pieces are taken out, they are dipped in malt sugar and then served.

The origin of the name is said to come from Su Dongpo, a famed Song dynasty poet who named it when it was served soon after he had made three cuts into a wall with a knife in a moment of revelry.

Misandao is also the name of a Chinese punk band, named after the confection. The snack was also popularized as one of the favorite foods of Olympic skier Eileen Gu.
