= Pease pudding =

Savoury pudding dish made of boiled legumes

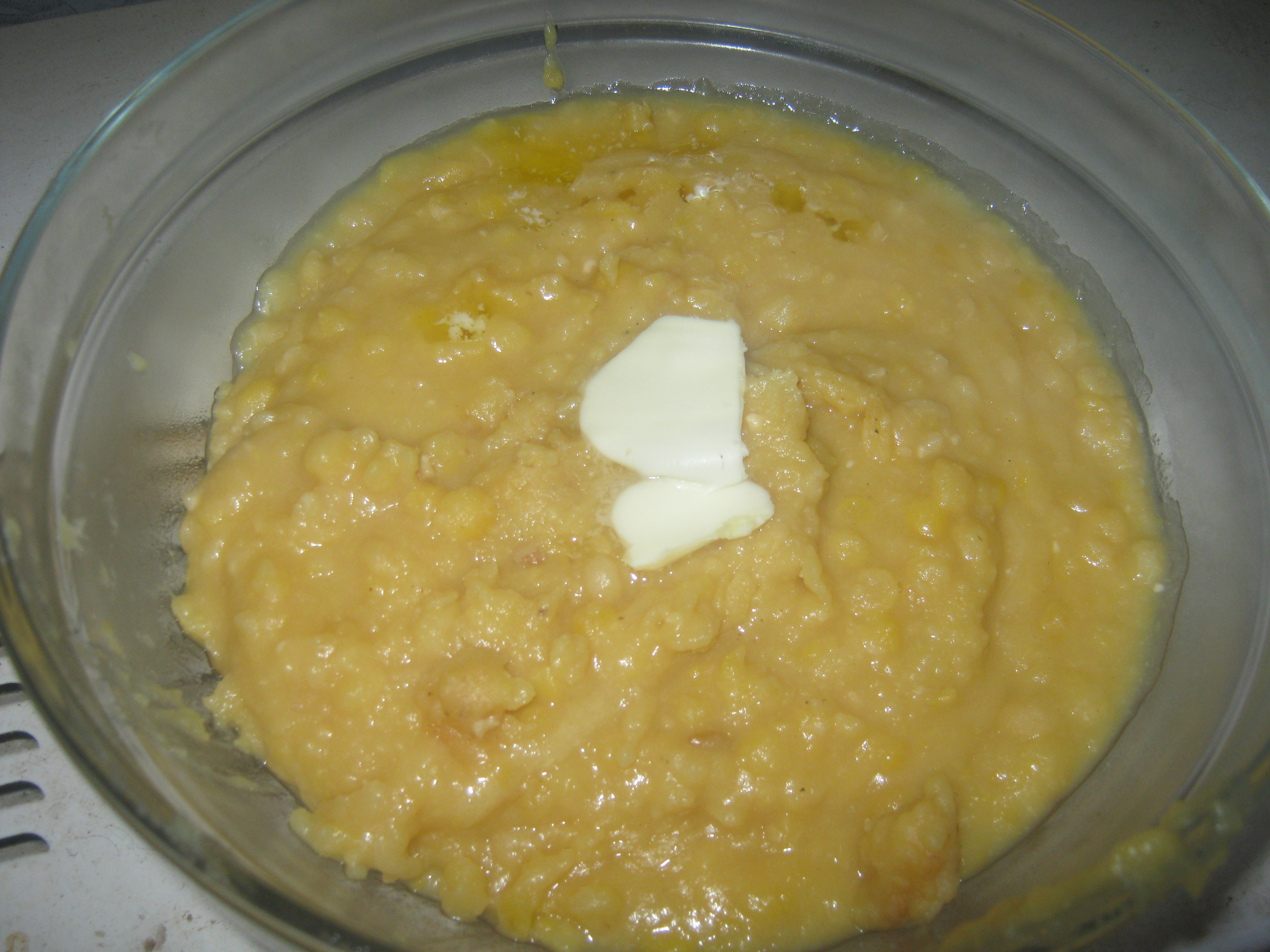
- Alternative names: Pease pottage, pease porridge
- Type: Pudding
- Place of origin: England
- Main ingredients: Split yellow peas, water, salt, spices

Pease pudding, also known as pease porridge, is a savoury pudding dish made of boiled legumes, typically split yellow peas, with water, salt and spices, and often cooked with a bacon or ham joint. A common dish in the north-east of England, it is consumed to a lesser extent in the rest of Britain. In Newfoundland, it retains its traditional name as part of the customary Jiggs dinner. In non-English speaking countries, similar dishes exist under different names.

== Dish ==
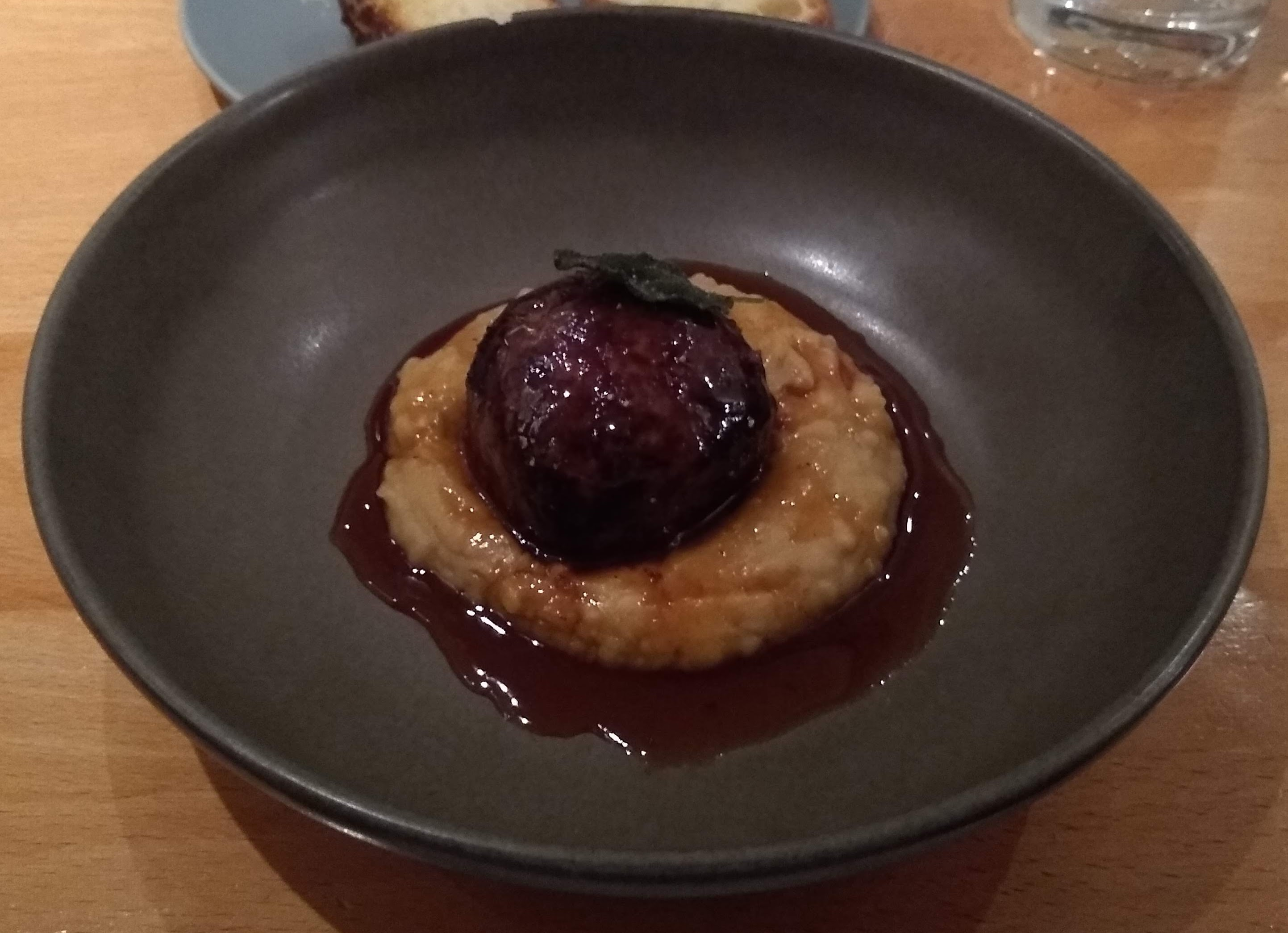
Pease pudding and faggot (meatball)

Pease pudding is typically thick, somewhat similar in texture to (but perhaps a little more solid than) hummus, and is light yellow in colour, with a mild taste. Pease pudding is traditionally produced in England, especially in the industrial North Eastern areas including Newcastle, South Shields, Sunderland and on down to Darlington on the North Yorkshire border. It is often served with ham or bacon, beetroot and stottie cakes. It is also a key ingredient in the classic saveloy dip. In Southern England, it is usually served with faggots. It was historically eaten in the East End by Cockneys, especially in the late 19th and early 20th centuries, served with saveloy. Also in the south is the small village of Pease Pottage which, according to tradition, gets its name from serving pease pottage to convicts either on their way from London to the South Coast, or from East Grinstead to Horsham.

Peasemeal brose, also known as brosemeal, is a traditional breakfast dish in the north of Scotland. It is made in the traditional way and usually eaten with butter, and either salt or honey.

In parts of the Midlands, it replaces mushy peas as a traditional accompaniment to fish and chips, although the distinction is largely the name and tendency for mushy peas to be green. In both cases, the starchy "field peas" used are harvested dry, as opposed to "sweet peas", which are the same species harvested fresh.

== Etymology ==
In Middle English, pease was a mass noun used in the same way as flour or oatmeal. Later taken to be a plural form, the modern singular pea and its plural peas derive from this, in a process known as back-formation.

== Regional variations ==
The dish is a traditional part of Jiggs dinner in Newfoundland, Canada.

In German-speaking countries, pease pudding is known under the name Erbspüree or Erbsenpüree. Alternative regional names are Erbsbrei or Erbsmus. It is especially widespread in the traditional cuisine of the German capital Berlin. The best-known German dish which is traditionally served with pease pudding is Eisbein. A similar dish with ham hock, karka, is served in Lithuania.

In the Netherlands, pea soup is called snert, or erwtensoep. It is cooked with dried split peas (yellow, or green), with chopped onions and bay leaf, and a smoked pork sausage, often Polish, which is then sliced, and served with the soup.

Traditional Russian cuisine has several pea-based dishes, including pease pudding/puree/soups known as gorohovaya kasha (Russian: гороховая каша) or goroshnitsa (Russian: горошница). In the Gorokhovetsky District of Vladimir Oblast the dish goes by the name puchalka (Russian: пучалка) and is traditionally made for weddings, commemorations of the dead, Christmas, and Great Lent.

In Beijing cuisine, wandouhuang (豌豆黄) is a sweetened and chilled pease pudding made with yellow split peas or shelled mung beans, sometimes flavoured with sweet osmanthus blossoms and dates. A refined version of this snack is said to have been a favourite of Empress Dowager Cixi.

In Greek cuisine, a similar dish is called fava (Φάβα). Despite the name, it is usually made from yellow split peas, not broad beans. The mashed peas are usually drizzled with olive oil and topped with chopped raw onions.

== Recipe ==
Generally, recipes for pease pudding involve steeping soaked split yellow peas in stock (traditionally ham hock stock) and cooking them for around 40 minutes. The resulting mush is then blended with other ingredients, which depend on the variation. The oldest known written recipe for something similar to pease pudding involves saffron, nutmeg and a little cinnamon in the blending process; modern recipes sometimes beat in an egg at this point to act as an extra binding agent.

== In popular culture ==
Pease pudding is featured in a nursery rhyme, "Pease Porridge Hot".

The song "Food, Glorious Food" from the 1960s West End and Broadway musical (and 1968 film) Oliver! has a lyric extolling pease pudding.

In the Victorian novel The Princess and the Goblin, Curdie takes bread and pease pudding with him for sustenance when he goes to spy on the King's house.

Pease porridge is discussed extensively in Stephen Graham Jones's 2025 novel The Buffalo Hunter Hunter, where it is associated with themes of greed, excess, and gluttony.

== See also ==
- Daal
- Ful medames
- Hummus
- List of porridges
- Pea soup
- Mushy peas
- Porridge
- Pottage
