= Jingjiang rousi =

Traditional dish served in Beijing

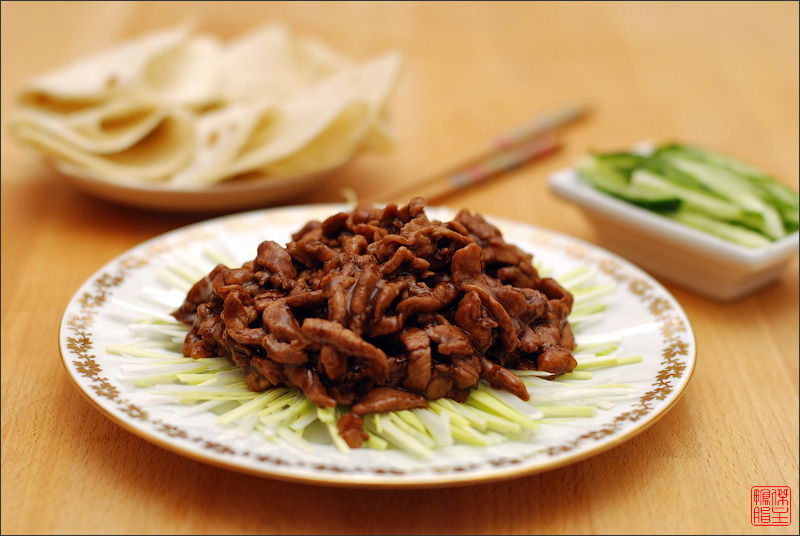
Jing Jiang Rou Si, served with doupi and cucumber slices.

Jingjiang rousi (simplified Chinese: 京酱肉丝; traditional Chinese: 京醬肉絲; pinyin: Jīngjiàng ròusī), or sauteed shredded pork in sweet bean sauce, is a traditional dish in Beijing. Its main ingredient is pork tenderloin, which is stir-fried with soya paste or sweet soya paste for flavour. The dish is served with shredded leek (only using its white stalk) and doupi (dried tofu layer) to wrap. A vegetarian variant uses fried tofu puffs in place of pork.

It may be prepared and consumed wrapped in doupi, or rarely with bing. Some versions are prepared using hoisin sauce.

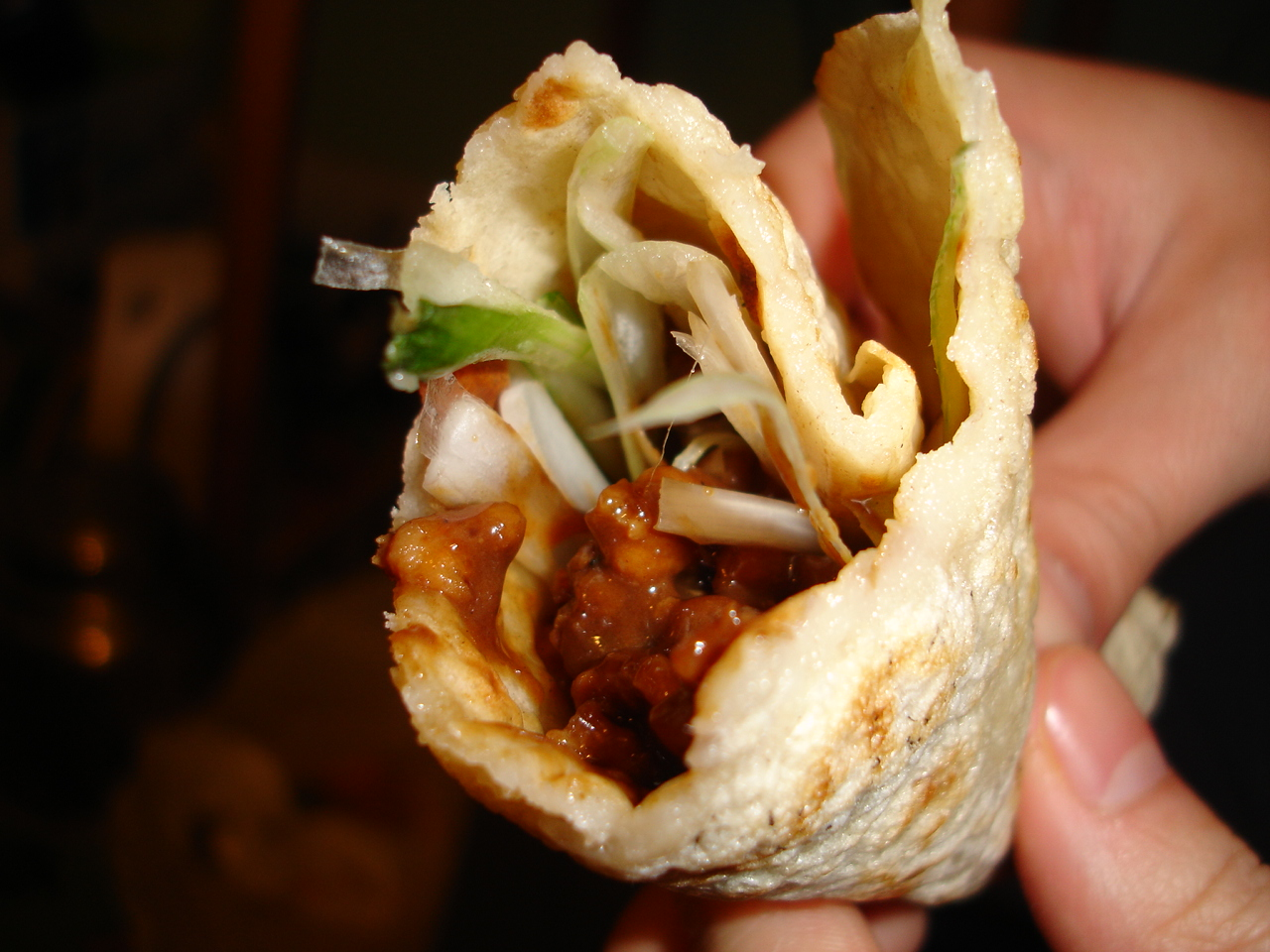
Jing Jiang Rou Si may be placed in bing
