= Yinsi juan =

Yinsi juan (Chinese: 银丝卷; pinyin: yínsījuǎn; lit. 'silver thread roll') is a Shandong style bread. The name comes from the long threads of dough that are pulled when it's being made.

Yin si juan are typically made from wheat flour, giving them a white appearance. They are first steamed, then can be baked. There are two main ways to assemble yin si juan from the stretched dough threads; one in which the lengths are wrapped in a sheet of dough, and another in which the ends of the stretched dough are pinched together and folded in on itself to secure the shape.
