= Zhang Dongguan =

Zhang Dongguan (張東官; fl. 18th century) was the lead cook in the palace during at least Qianlong Emperor's reign. Not much historical source survives about him, but according to legends the first Manchu Han Imperial Feast in 1722 was prepared by him.

Zhang Dongguan was from Suzhou, and received special rewards from Qianlong Emperor at least 5 times between 1765 and 1780. He often accompanied the emperor on private tours.
