= Kaikouxiao =

Chinese fried sesame egg cake

Kai kou xiao
- Type: Pastry
- Place of origin: China
- Region or state: Beijing
- Main ingredients: Flour, peanut oil, eggs, sugar, malt sugar, sesame seeds, baking soda

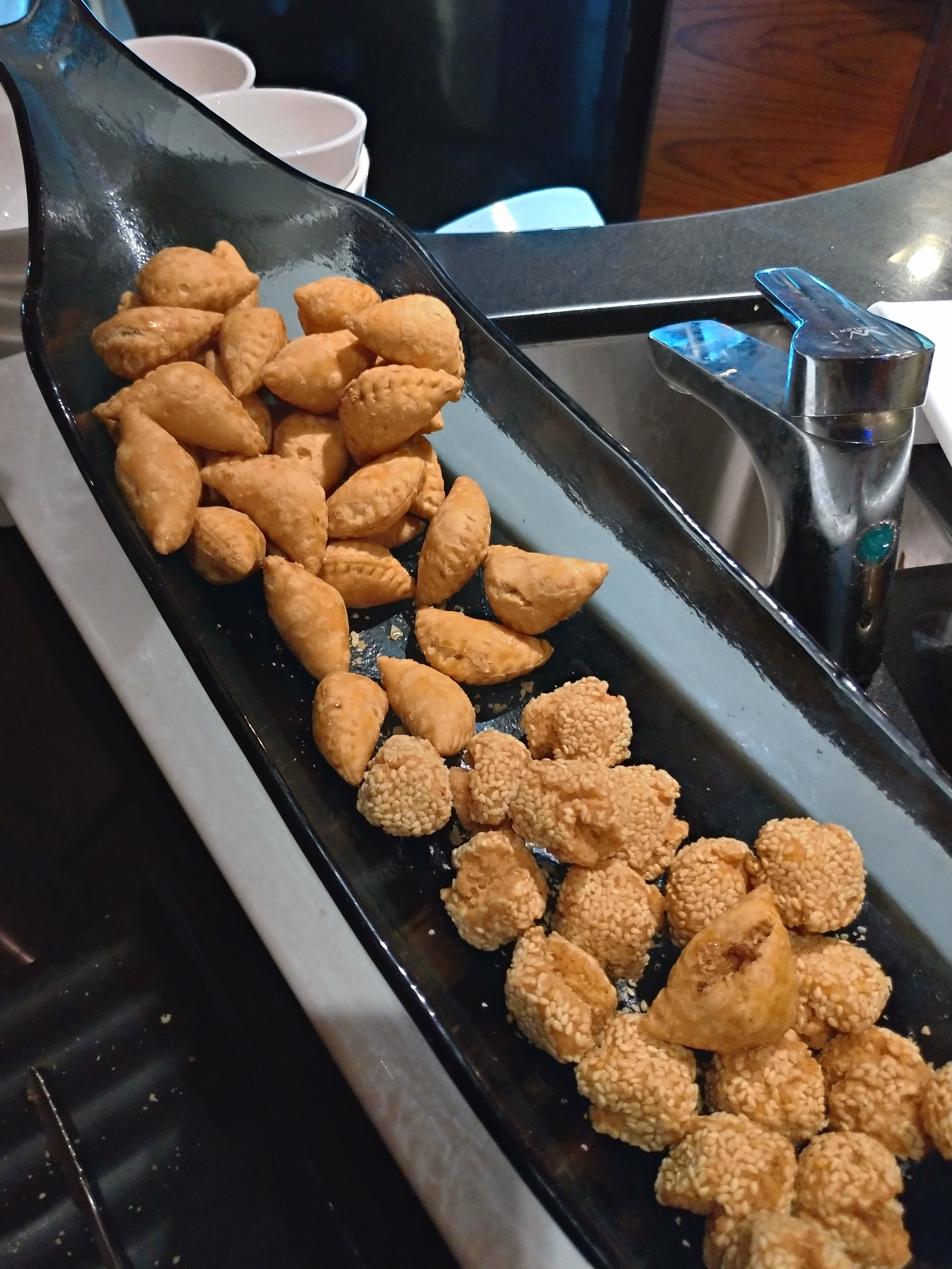
Sesame cookie balls (bottom) in Hong Kong.

Kaikouxiao (Chinese: 开口笑; pinyin: kāikǒuxiào; lit. 'open mouth laughing') is a fried sesame egg cake found in Chinese cuisine.

Also called "smiling sesame cookies" or "laughing balls", they are a popular dish during Lunar New Year for their resemblance to a smiling mouth.

== Preparation ==
The traditional culinary method of this dish begins with the preparation of flour, peanut oil, egg, sugar, malt sugar, sesame seeds and baking soda. With the exception of the sesame seeds, everything else is mixed together, and the resulting dough is cut into pieces. The sesame seeds are boiled in water and each small piece of dough is rolled in the sesame seeds. The end result is then fried on a skillet. The chef must lift the frying pan off the stove and put it back on depending on the situation. The resulting opening crack is where the literal name in Chinese comes from, as it resembles a happy smiling mouth.
