= Beijing yogurt =

Chinese fermented milk drink

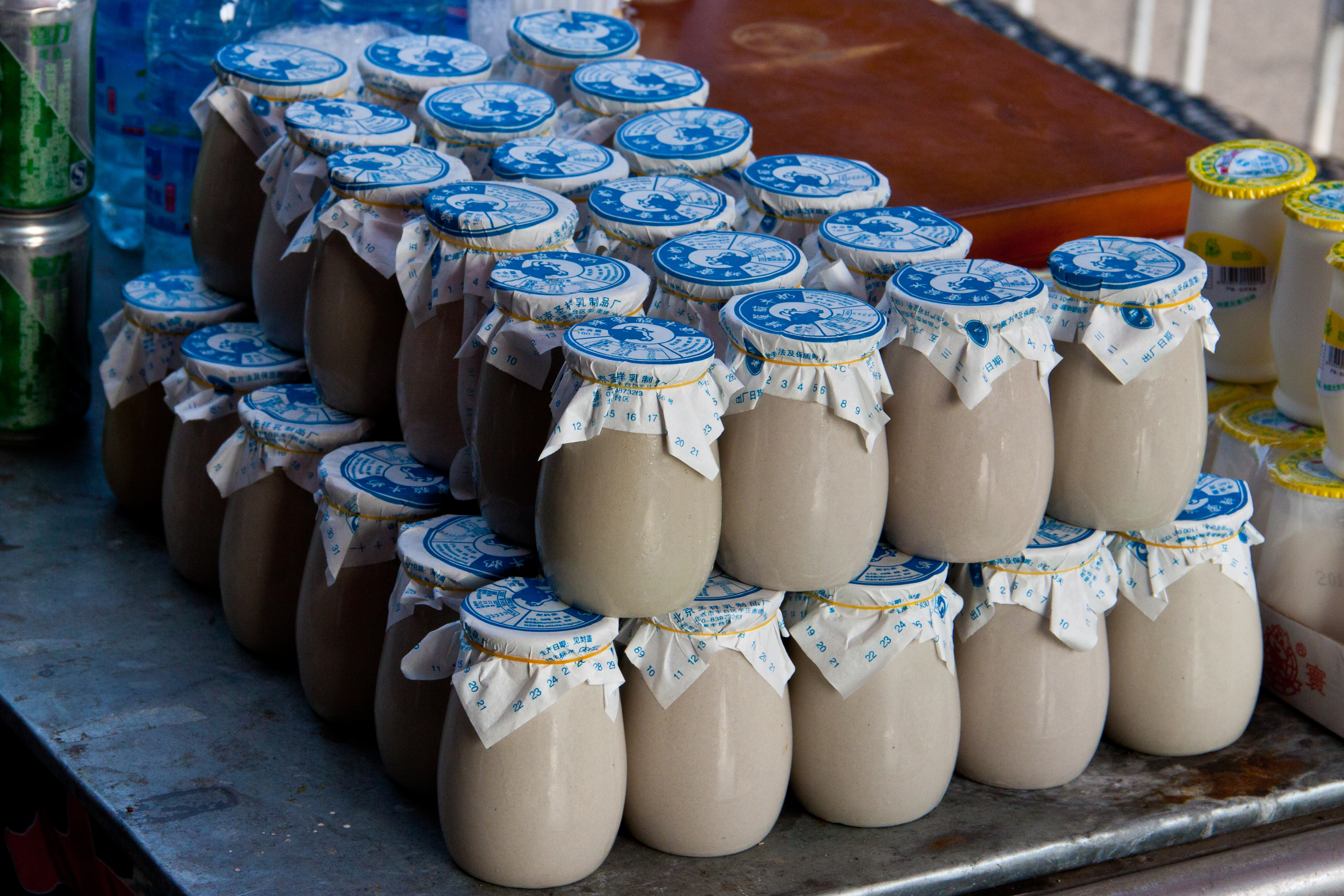
- Beijing yogurt for sale at Wangfujing
- Type: Yogurt
- Place of origin: China
- Region or state: Beijing
- Main ingredients: Milk, sugar, nuts, raisins, rice wine

Beijing yogurt
- Chinese: 奶酪
Transcriptions
Standard Mandarin
- Hanyu Pinyin: nǎilào
Yue: Cantonese
- Jyutping: naai5 lok6

Nailao (Chinese: 奶酪; pinyin: nǎilào), also known as Beijing yogurt (Chinese: 北京酸奶; pinyin: Běijīng suānnǎi), is a traditional fermented milk drink that is popularly consumed throughout China. The word suannai means "sour milk".

== Preparation ==
Nailao is prepared by heating milk and adding sugar to it. Two types of nuts mixed with raisins and rice wine made from glutinous rice are poured in and thoroughly stirred. A special device called lào tǒng (酪桶, lit. 'yogurt barrel') is used during production. A lào tǒng contains a heat chamber in the center, providing the heat needed for cooking. The milk is mixed with rice wine and honey or sugar and is rapidly poured into fifty small bowls. The bowls are then stacked along the inner wall of the yogurt barrel, heated for about thirty minutes, and later cooled.

== Serving ==
Places that sell suānnǎi traditionally serve it in ceramic containers that must be returned to the vendor. However, many vendors now serve suān nǎi in disposable plastic cups.

In 2011, a factory specializing in Beijing-style yogurt was opened in the US.

== See also ==
- List of yogurt-based dishes and beverages
