= Pease Porridge Hot =

Nursery rhyme and clapping game

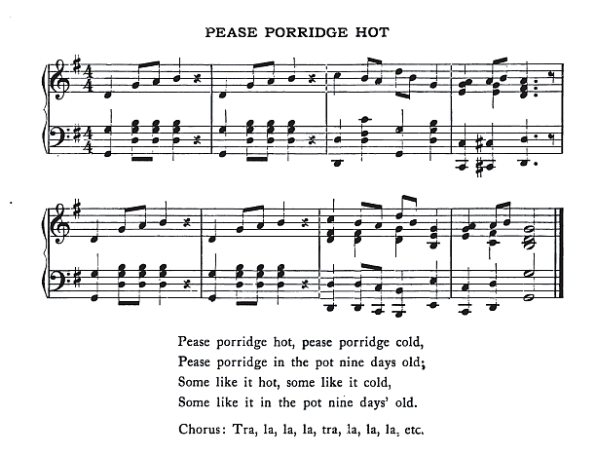
- Music from The Song Play Book.

Nursery rhyme
- Published: c. 1760
- Songwriter(s): Traditional

"Pease Porridge Hot" or "Pease Pudding Hot" is an English children's singing game and nursery rhyme. It has a Roud Folk Song Index number of 19631.

== Lyrics ==
The lyrics to the rhyme are:

Pease Porridge Hot
Tune for Pease Porridge Hot

Pease porridge hot, pease porridge cold,
Pease porridge in the pot, nine days old;
Some like it hot, some like it cold,
Some like it in the pot, nine days old.

== Origin ==
The origins of this rhyme are unknown. The name refers to a type of porridge made from peas. Today it is known as pease pudding, and was also known in Middle English as pease pottage. ("Pease" was treated as a mass noun, similar to "oatmeal", and the singular "pea" and plural "peas" arose by back-formation.)

The earliest recorded version of "Pease Porridge Hot" is a riddle found in John Newbery's Mother Goose's Melody (c. 1760):

Pease Porridge hot,

Pease Porridge cold,

Pease Porridge in the Pot

Nine Days old,

Spell me that in four Letters?

I will, THAT.

Where the terms "pease pudding" and "pease pottage" are used, the lyrics of the rhyme are altered accordingly.

== Game ==
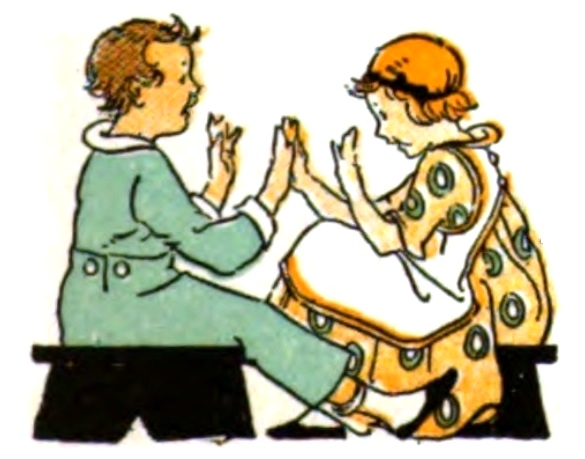
Children playing Pease Porridge Hot.

Schoolchildren often play Pease Porridge Hot by pairing off and clapping their hands together to the rhyme as follows:

Pease (clap both hands to thighs) porridge (clap own hands together) hot (clap partner's hands),

pease (clap both hands to thighs) porridge (clap own hands together) cold (clap partner's hands),

Pease (clap thighs) porridge (clap own hands) in the (clap right hands only) pot (clap own hands),

nine (clap left hands only) days (clap own hands) old (clap partner's hands).

(Repeat actions for second stanza)

NOTE: The actions are performed during recitation of the word or phrase, not following.
