= Scaphium (disambiguation) =

Scaphium can refer to:

- Scaphium - a genus of plants
- Scaphium (beetle) - a genus of beetles
- Part of the Weberian apparatus in fish anatomy
- Scaphium (vessel), an ancient shallow vessel without a handle. It was called like that because it was shaped like a small boat.
