= Shanzhagao =

Chinese dessert

Shanzhagao (Chinese: 山楂糕, Pinyin: shānzhāgāo) or hawthorn cake is a Chinese snack food made from the Chinese hawthorn, Crataegus pinnatifida. Shanzhagao is red in color and has a gummy texture. It is typically cut into cubes.

== Process ==
The red dessert is usually made by cooking hawthorn berries and blending or pounding them into a paste. The paste is then cooked again and placed in a dish to set into a gelatin-like state. Sugar is also typically added during the paste stage.

== Traditional medicine ==
Chinese hawthorn berries have been believed to benefit health in Chinese traditional medicine since the Tang dynasty. It is particularly believed to benefit the heart and digestive system.

== See also ==
- Haw flakes
- Pear-syrup candy
- Tanghulu
