= Candy apple =

Whole apple with a hard toffee coating

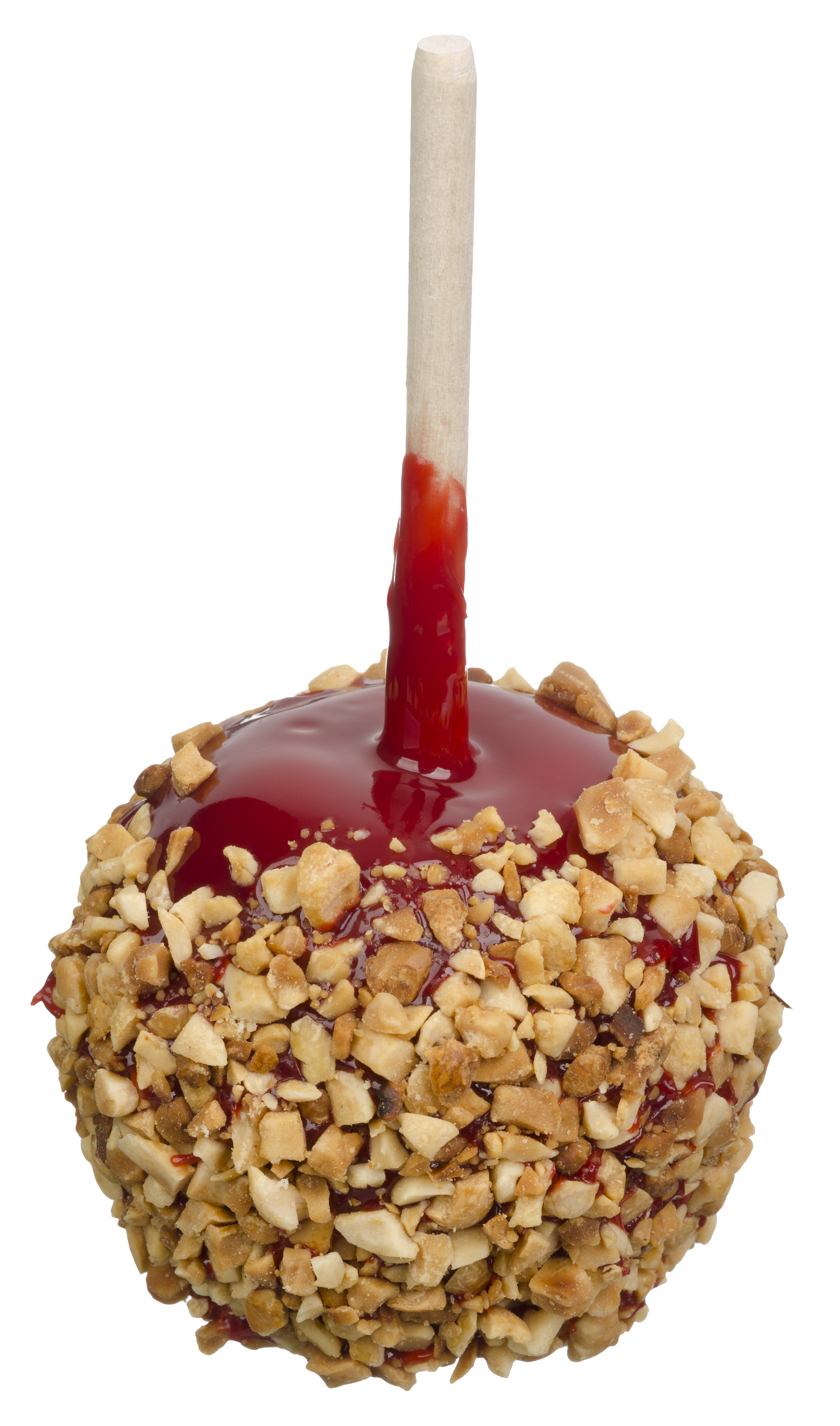
- Candy apple coated with red caramel and covered with chopped peanuts
- Type: Confectionery
- Place of origin: England
- Region or state: London
- Main ingredients: Apples and sugar candy

Candy apples (in American English) or toffee apples (in Commonwealth English) are whole apples covered in a sugar candy coating, with a stick inserted as a handle. These are a common treat at fall festivals in Western culture in the Northern Hemisphere, such as Halloween and Guy Fawkes Night, because these festivals occur in the wake of annual apple harvests. Although candy apples and caramel apples may seem similar, they are made using distinctly different processes.

== History ==
Candy apples were originally sold in London in the 1890s. In the US William W. Koln sold the earliest known America version of a red candy apple in 1908. He sold the whole first batch for 5 cents each and later sold thousands yearly. Soon candied apples were being sold along the Jersey Shore, at the circus and in candy shops across the country, according to the Newark News in 1948.

== Ingredients and method ==
Candy apples are made by coating an apple with a layer of sugar that has been heated to hard crack stage. The most common sugar coating is made from sugar (white or brown), corn syrup, water, cinnamon and red food coloring. Humid weather can prevent the sugar from hardening.

== Regional traditions ==
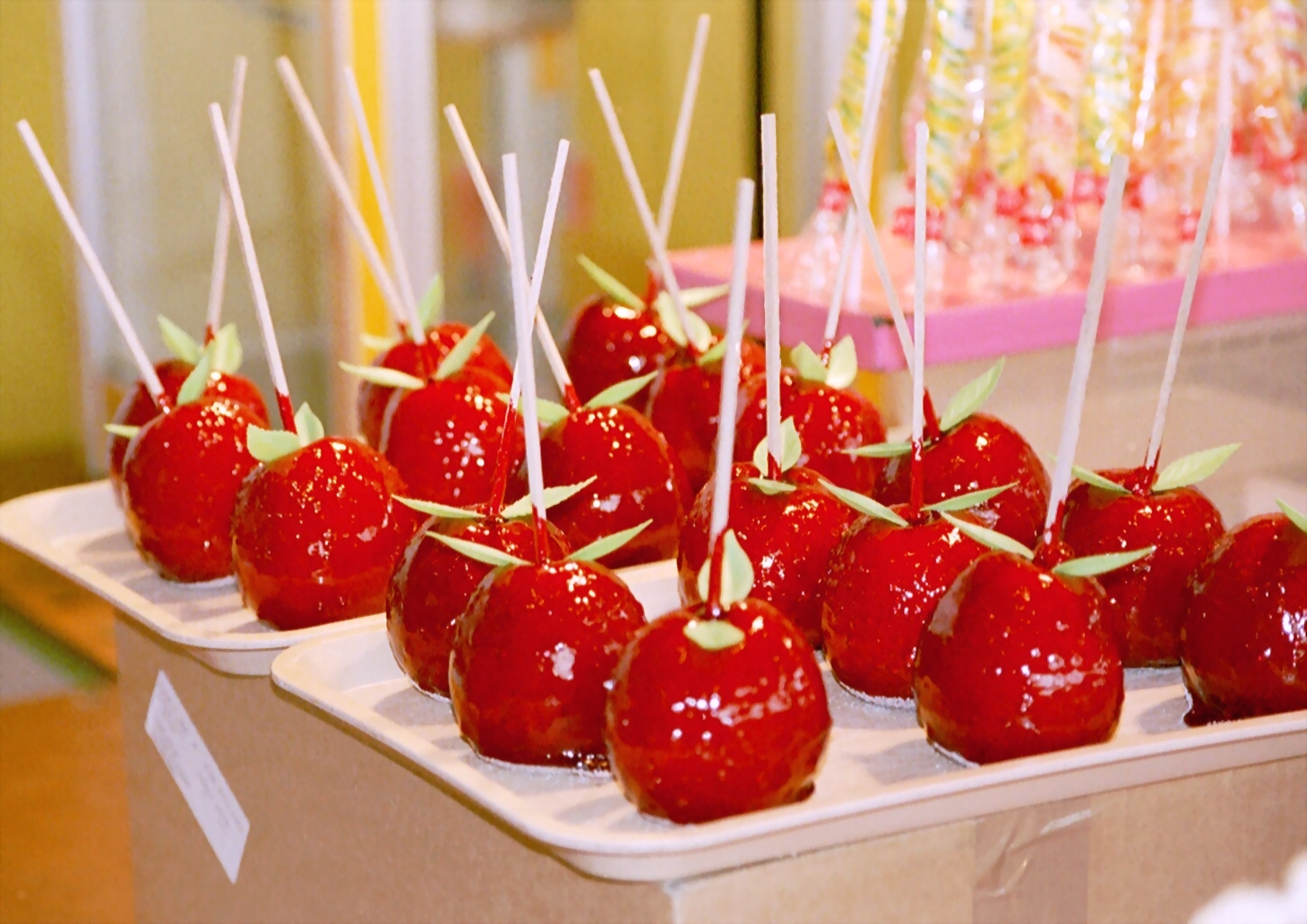
Pommes d'amour on display

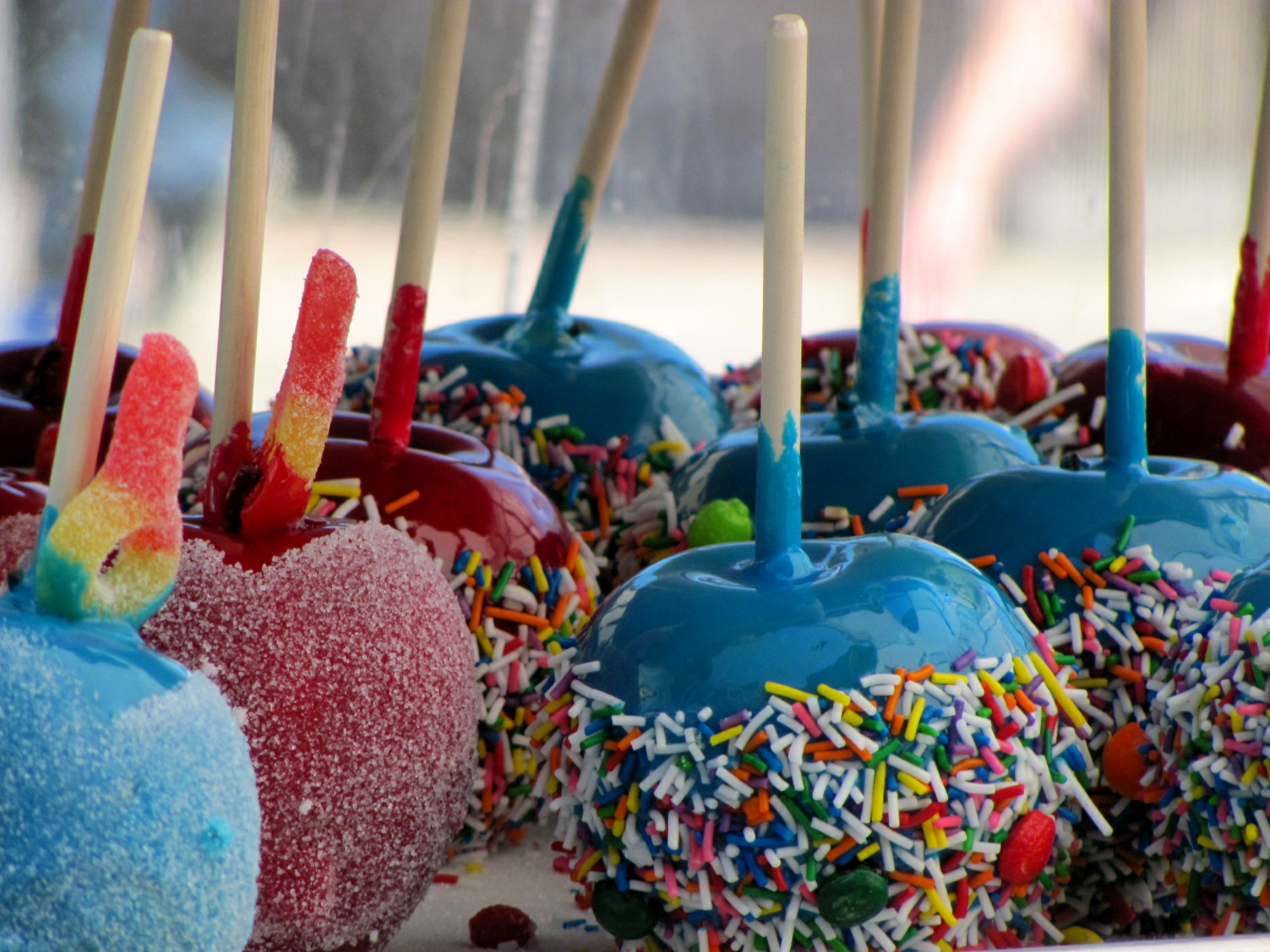
Blue and red candy apples, dipped in sprinkles and sugar

- Australia – the Granny Smith variety of apple is considered ideal for toffee apples.
- Brazil – candy apples (named as in other Lusophone countries maçã do amor, as in the French pommes d'amour, meaning "apples of love") are common in the festivities in honor of John the Baptist.
- Mainland China – a similar treat called Tanghulu is made by coating small fruits, traditionally hawthorns with hard sugar syrup.
- Canada – very popular and usually eaten at fairs or carnivals.
- France – candy apples are called pommes d'amour (apples of love). They are a common treat found at many festivals.
- Germany – most often associated with Christmas. They are also sometimes sold at carnivals and fairs
- Israel – almost solely sold in cities' squares on Yom Ha'atzmaut eve (Israel Independence Day) as part of the street celebrations.
- Japan – candy apples, grapes, strawberries and tangerines are commonly available at Japanese festivals.
- Republic of Ireland – eaten at Halloween.
- United Kingdom – toffee apples are associated with and eaten at Halloween (Scotland and Northern Ireland), or Bonfire Night (England, Scotland and Wales).
- United States – jelly apples, found in New York's Coney Island area, are related but have a soft candy ("jelly") coating and a cherry flavor, not cinnamon.
- Uruguay – Manzanas acarameladas, sold in fairs, zoos and carnivals
- South Africa - toffee apples are mostly available at supermarkets such as Checkers and Spar. They are also very popular throughout apple season. Mostly dipped in red or green coloured sugar syrup.

== See also ==
- List of apple dishes
- Lollipop
- Tanghulu
- Caramel apple
