= Pear-syrup candy =

Chinese traditional medicine and confection

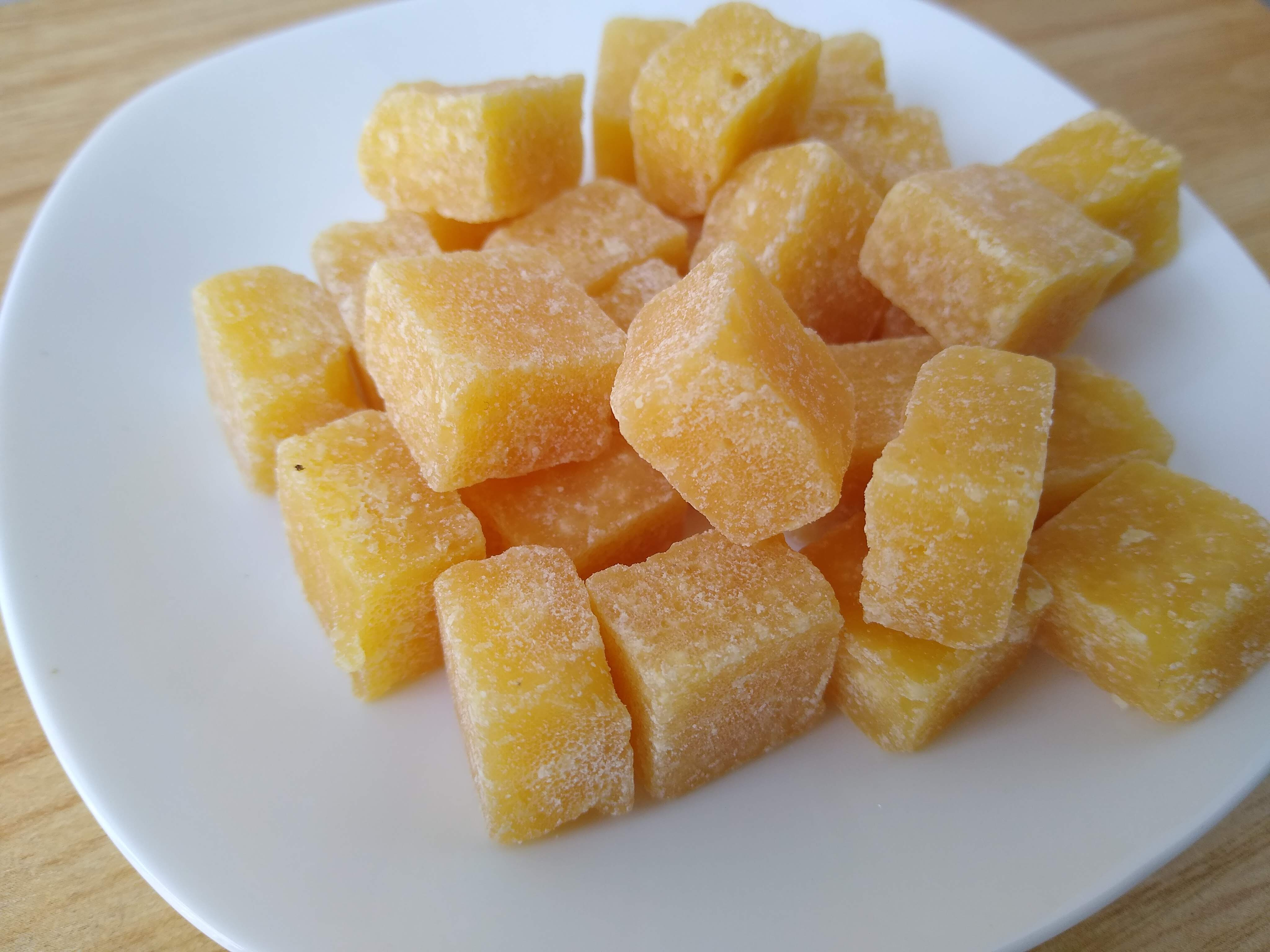
- Alternative names: Ligaotang; Liqingtang
- Place of origin: China
- Region or state: Jiangnan
- Created by: Wei Zheng
- Main ingredients: Pear, honey, rock candy

Pear-syrup candy, also known as lígāotáng (梨膏糖) or líqīnggāo (梨清膏), is a traditional medicine and confection from eastern area of the Jiangnan region of China, where it was traditionally used to relieve coughing, reduce sputum, and stimulate appetite. Its main components are pear juice, honey, and various kinds of herbs. With modern medical science, it is now rarely used to treat coughing; pear-syrup candy has become a souvenir and a snack, and is a part of Jiangnan culture.

== History ==
=== Ancient ===
The history of pear-syrup candy can be traced back to 634 (the Tang Zhenguan Eighth Year). According to legend, the mother of Wei Zheng (a renowned official of the Tang dynasty) suffered from a cough, so the imperial court sent imperial physicians to treat her. However, Wei's mother felt that the medicines were too bitter to take, and so she failed to take them on time, and thus curing her took a long time. For this reason, Wei Zheng decided to make his own medicine, combining almond, chuanbei (bulbus fritillariae cirrhosae), tuckahoe, and juhong (red tangerine peel), and adding the combination to pear syrup, and finally decocting the whole thing into paste. Wei's mother took the medicine and was soon cured. After that, Wei shared this prescription to the public, and not only the upper classes but ordinary people produced it, so the method of making the candy became widespread.

During the Northern Song dynasty (960–1127), the production and sales of pear-syrup candy normalized, becoming a huge industry. In Luoyang, the western capital, there were countless shops selling it, and the production technology was quite mature. After the Jingkang incident in 1127, many of the craftspeople involved in its production moved to the Southern Song dynasty (1127–1279), in the south of China. They passed through Yangzhou and settled down in Hangzhou, the Southern Song capital. Thus, pear-syrup candy appeared in Suzhou, Wuxi, Changzhou, and nearby areas. The candy has remained popular throughout Jiangnan since that time.

=== Modern ===
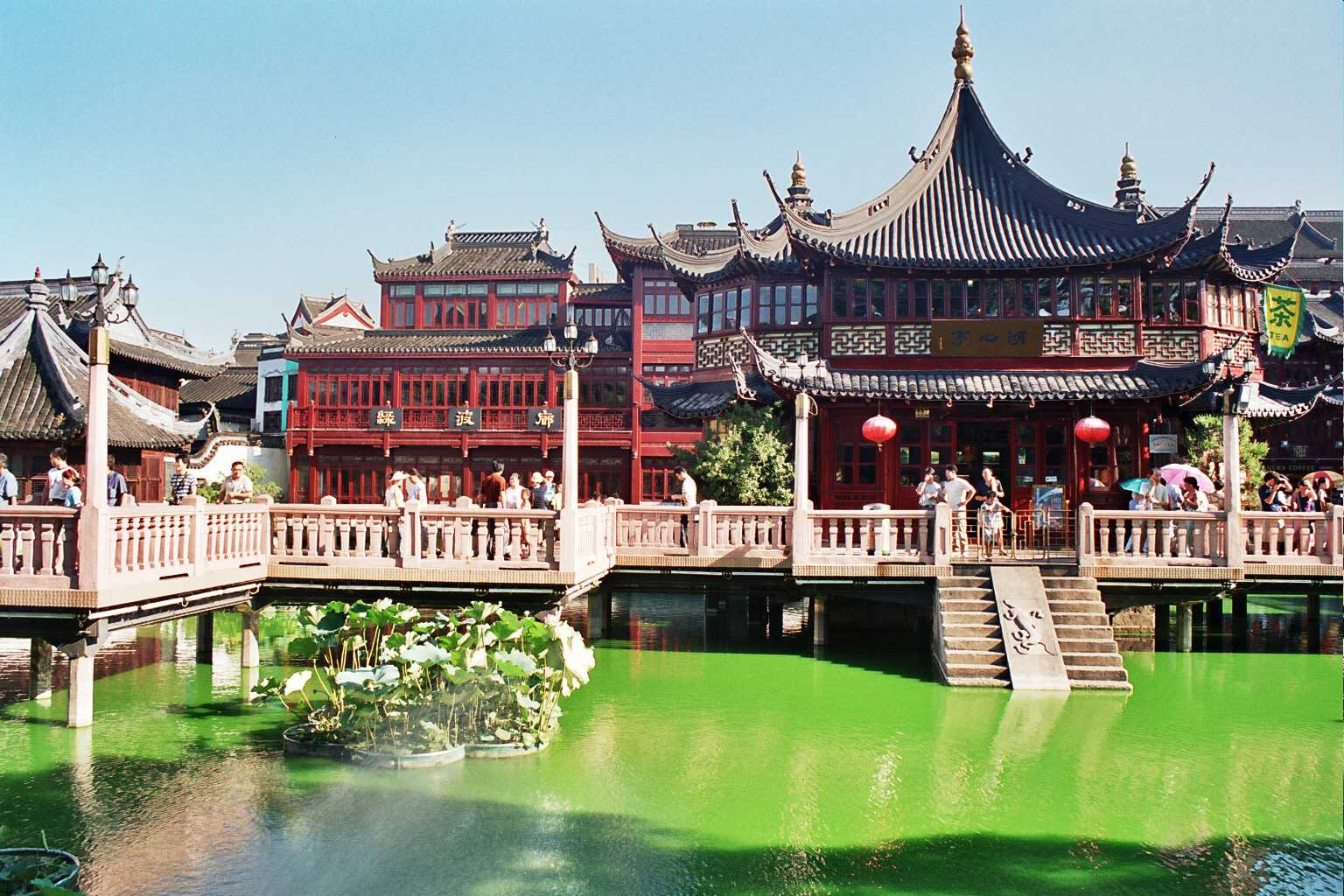
Chenghuang Miao (City God Temple of Shanghai), Shanghai, one of the most important sites for the modern ligaotang industry.

In modern times, pear-syrup candy has developed into Shanghai style, Suzhou style, Hangzhou style, Yangzhou style, and Ningbo style; these styles have mingled and were popular in Shanghai. The prosperity of the Shanghai pear-syrup candy industry started in the mid nineteenth century. In 1855, Zhupinzhai, the first pear-candy shop in Chenghuang Miao in Shanghai opened. In 1882, Yongsheng Tang, the second pear-syrup candy shop in the Old Chenglong Miao opened. In 1904, Deshengtang, the third pear-syrup candy shop opened in the north of the Old Chenglong Miao. These shops were the three most important in fierce competition which stimulated the rapid development of the ligaotang industry, helping it reach the peak of its manufacture. In production, the shops insisted on producing hand-made products based on the shop's secret recipe, with homology of medicine and food. In addition to the medical ligaotang, there were other kinds with mint, pine nut, dried meat floss, or rose. All were popular among tea drinkers and the audiences of story-telling houses.

In 1956, the Chinese Communist Party initiated a public-private partnership. Zhupinzhai, Yongshengtang, and Deshengtang were merged and transferred to the Shanghai Pear-Syrup Candy Food Factory (上海梨膏糖食品厂), which became the leading corporation in pear-syrup candy production in China. It is now a holding subsidiary corporation of Yuyuan Tourist Mart, a local listed enterprise in Shanghai. Modern factories divide ligaotang into two types: food-oriented and medicine-oriented. The food-oriented type consists of Chinese herbs and natural ingredients, with dozens of flavors such as mint, Chinese cymbidium, shrimp, walnut, kumquat, dried meat floss, almond, ginkgo, ham, peanut, pine nut, rose, sweet-scented osmanthus, sweet bean paste, etc. The medicine-oriented pear-syrup candy gains the production validation approved by the Ministry of Health of the People's Republic of China (MOH). Pear-syrup candies with colloidal medicine, grain-like electuaries, cough reduction, various herbs, and Sichuan fritillary bulbs all contribute to treating cough, tracheitis, asthma, and other illnesses to some extent.

== Medicinal value ==
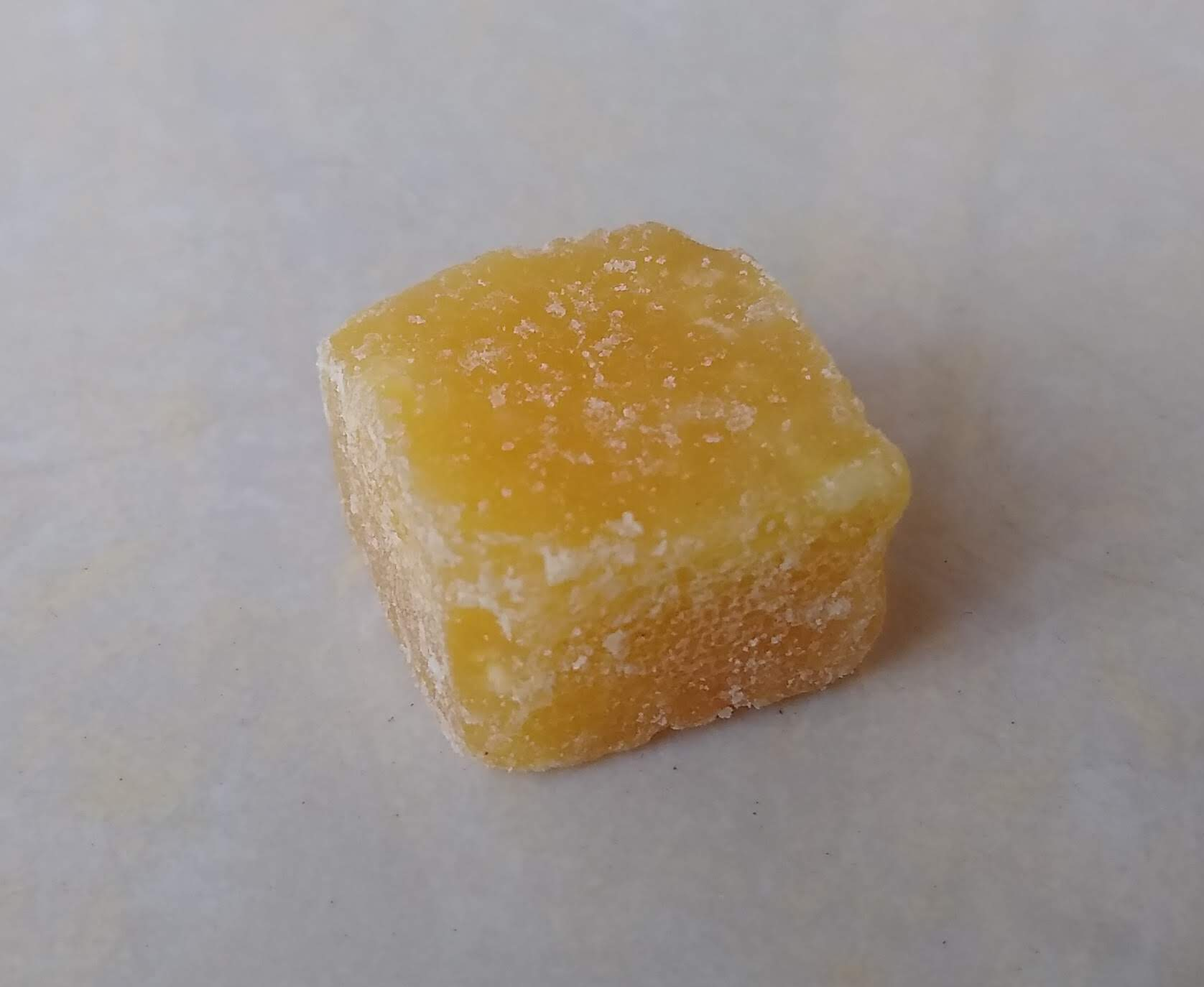
A cube of pear-syrup candy.

The candy contains calcium, potassium, iron and other micronutrients that the human body needs. It also contains nutrients including carotene, thiamine, riboflavin, folic acid, ascorbic acid, etc. Traditional pear-syrup candy is made from loquat or fresh pear, along with almond, jiegeng (桔梗, Platycodon grandiflorus, Chinese bellflower), tuckahoe, banxia (半夏, Pinellia ternata), donghua (冬花, flos farfarae/coltsfoot/Tussilago farfara), qianhu (前胡, common hogfennel root; Peucedanum praeruptorum), juhong (橘红, red tangerine peel), beimu (贝母, Fritillaria thunbergii), other medicines, and sugar. In some recipes, it also contains pangdahai (Scaphium scaphigerum) and honeysuckle (Lonicera japonica), functioning to clear and nourish the throat, relieve coughing and reduce sputum.

The medical value of modern pear-syrup candy has been reduced. Except those factories with a long history which were permitted by the MOH to manufacture medicinal ligaotang, ordinary factories can only produce food-oriented pear-syrup candy. The MOH and China Food and Drug Administration have stipulated that food and medicines must be sold separately. They also pointed out that manufacturers should try to avoid using medical ingredients in food or materials of medicine food homology. In the Law of Food Safety of People's Republic of China (《中华人民共和国食品安全法》) and Measures of Banning Medicine Adding in Food and Health Management (《禁止食品加药卫生管理办法》), it has been stated that food manufacturers cannot add medicines to food although some traditional food have edible medicinal ingredients. In labelling pear-syrup candy, it is banned to claim that it can relieve cough or reduce sputum, and neither terms like 'dietetic food' nor 'health food' can be used.

== Cultural influences ==
=== Production process performance ===
In the past, pear-syrup candy production could be a kind of performance, with two main types: Wenmai, which was artistic, and Wumai, which was similar to martial arts. The former one is also called Cuomu (锉木), sometimes involving the singing of local music. Thus, it attracted crowds and provided people with understanding of the process. Wenmai became a special selling method among Shanghai retailers.

=== The "Xiaorehun" Rap ===
Wumai is also called "Luobang", which is a selling method in the form of rap. Rapping and peddling in various dialects, it won popular favour. Vendors' raps included when they had something new to sell, as they moved from street to street. Among these vendors, Chen Changsheng (stage name: Xiao Deli) was the most famous, considered representative of ligaotang sellers in Suzhou. After him, Du Baolin created something new based on Chen's creation. He added criticisms of politics and satire of officials. To avoid trouble from the government, he called himself "Xiaorehun", asserting that all he said was nonsense, and it was needless for officials to worry about it. Du Baolin's "Xiaorehun" rap became popular in Hangzhou. Later, he came to Shanghai seeking new opportunities, and became a famous comedian in Shanghai in 1920s. "Xiaorehun" then became an alternative name for pear-syrup candy. In 1958, Wu Jingshou (Stage name: Xiao Mingli), current Vice Director of Changzhou Folk Arts Sodality, and Bao Yunfei (stage name: Xiao Delin), established a Rap and Candy-selling Cooperation of Street Artists in the East Avenue in Changzhou, which helped spread the "Xiaorehun" culture in Suzhou. Wumai in Yangzhou was also interesting. Typically two people worked together at a time, and pairs of men and women pushed wheelbarrows and walked along the streets. They sold candies in crowded places and sang Xiaodiao (Yangzhou folk songs) to attract customers. Xiaodiao was clear and easy to understand, a bit like a roundelay, which often won laughter from the audience.

Some folklore experts consider that "Xiaorehun" has greatly contributed to the forming and development of Shanghai Dujiaoxi ("funny drama"). Furthermore, the fact that "Xiaorehun" artists were brave enough to express their ideas on politics openly can be regarded as an awakening of public awareness of fighting for the right of speech.

=== Nonmaterial Cultural Heritage ===
Shanghai City, Jiangsu Province, and Zhejiang Province all listed the performance of "Xiaorehun" or the production process of pear-syrup candy in their provincial level directory of nonmaterial cultural heritage. Shanghai government listed the making process of ligaotang into the Second Nonmaterial Cultural Heritage list of Shanghai. Jiangsu Province listed both Changzhou "Xiaorehun" and Changzhou style making process of ligaotang into the Nonmaterial Cultural Heritage list of Jiangsu Province. Zhejiang Province listed "Xiaorehun" into the First Nonmaterial Cultural Heritage of Zhejiang Province.

== Brands ==
Famous Chinese brands of pear-syrup candy currently produced include Caizhi Zhai and City God Temple of Shanghai by the Shanghai Pear-Syrup Candy Food Factory.
