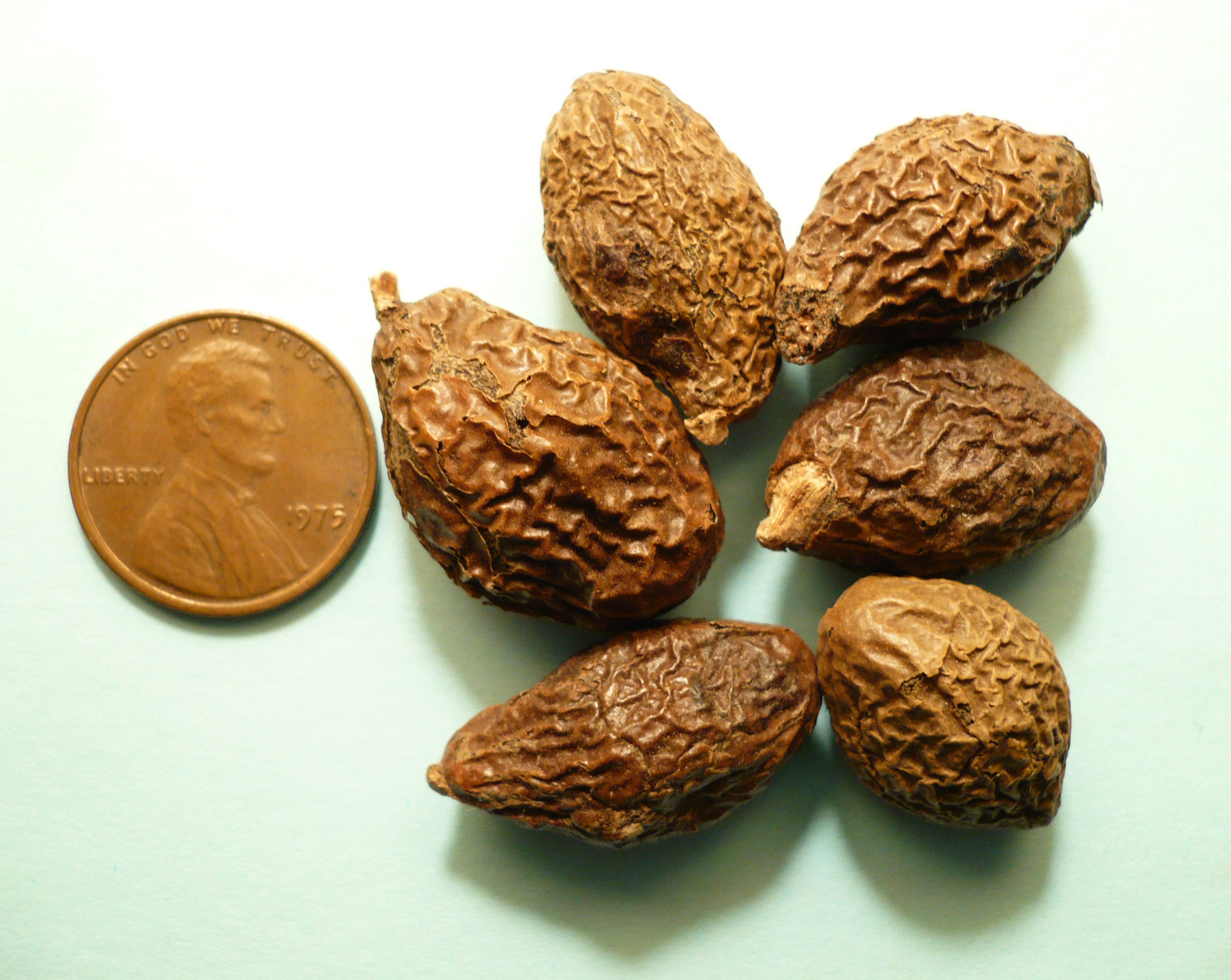
- Dried seeds for use in Vietnamese cuisine (known as hạt đười ươi)

Conservation status
- Least Concern (IUCN 3.1)

Scientific classification
- Kingdom: Plantae
- Clade: Tracheophytes
- Clade: Angiosperms
- Clade: Eudicots
- Clade: Rosids
- Order: Malvales
- Family: Malvaceae
- Genus: Scaphium
- Species: S. affine

Binomial name
- Scaphium affine (Mast.) Pierre

Synonyms
- Sterculia lychnophora Hance; Sterculia beccariana Pierre; Sterculia affinis Mast. Scaphium lychnophorum (Hance) Pierre; Scaphium beccarianum Pierre; Firmiana lychnophora (Hance) K. Schum. Firmiana affinis Terrac. Clompanus affinis Kuntze

= Scaphium affine =

Species of tree

Scaphium affine is a tree species in the family Malvaceae, subfamily Sterculioideae (previously placed in the Sterculiaceae and synonyms include Sterculia lychnophora Hance).The species is endemic to mainland Southeast Asia, and no subspecies are recognized in the Catalogue of Life.

Scaphium affine has culinary and traditional medicinal uses. In English, it is known as malva nut tree, or sometimes "Taiwan sweet gum tree", although these names also apply to the similar Scaphium macropodum (Vietnamese: ươi).

== Description ==
The tree can grow up to 25–30 meters in height, and its seeds are the size of a fingertip, with a brown, coarse-textured skin.

=== Common names for the malva nut ===
- Lao: ໝາກຈອງ /mȁːk cɔːŋ/
- Chinese: 胖大海; pinyin: pàngdàhǎi; lit. 'fat ocean'
- Vietnamese: hạt lười ươi; đười ươi; hột lười ươi
- Khmer: សំរង, lit. '(មិនមែនសំរ៉ង) ឈ្មោះឈើមួយប្រភេទ ផ្លែទុំស្ងួត បើត្រាំទឹករីកស្គុយ សាច់ស្កាតៗ ប្រើលាយស្ករបរិភោគជាចំណីត្រជាក់' /sɑmraoŋ/.
- Marathi: निरंजन फळ Niranjan Phal /NiRṃJN PhL/ (IAST)
- Hindi: मालवा फल Malva Phal /MāLVā PhL/ (IAST)
- Thai: ลูกสำรอง, หมากจอง, พุงทะลาย
- Malay: Kembang Semangkuk
- Tamil: அதிராம்பட்டினம், தமிழ்நாடு, உம்மாசலிமா கொட்டை

== Culinary and medicinal use of the nuts ==
In traditional medicine, especially Ayurveda and traditional Chinese medicine, the seeds of this species and its close relative, S. macropodum, are used to treat gastrointestinal disorders, to soothe the throat, and as a "coolant". As a result, it is a popular non-timber forest product in Laos, where it is the country's second-largest export crop after coffee. Sterculinine, a bio-active alkaloid, is found in this species.

=== Malva nuts in soups and desserts ===
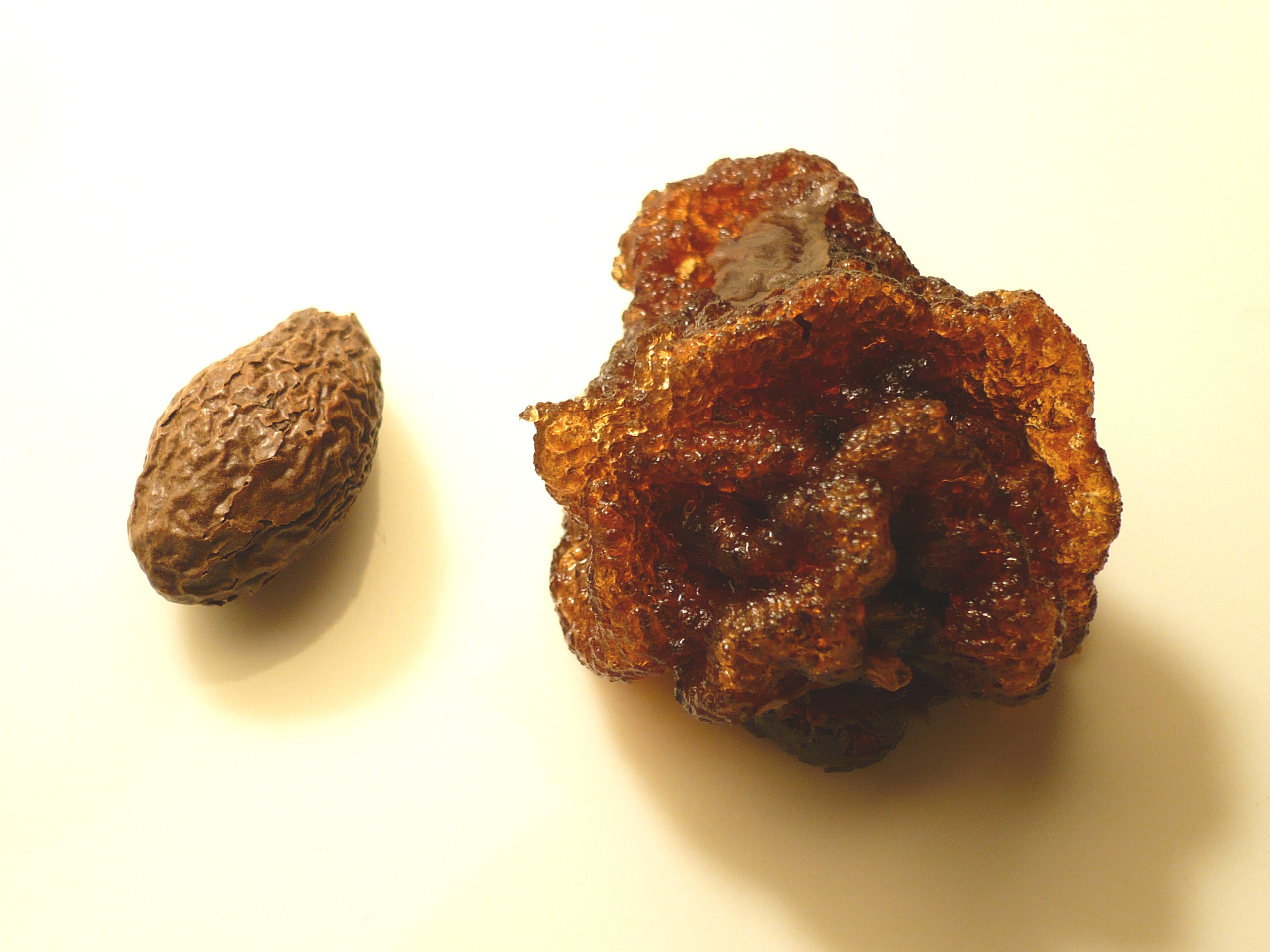
A dried Sterculia lychnophora seed compared to a water-soaked seed with its skin removed (right)

The flesh surrounding the dried seeds swells to eight times its original volume when soaked in water, forming an irregularly shaped, reddish gelatinous mass. In Vietnam, Thailand, Laos, and Cambodia, the flesh of the fruit, after being soaked and the seed kernel removed, is mixed with sugar, ice, and basil seeds to make a refreshing drink. They are sometimes also used, along with other ingredients, in sweet, cool soups similar to the Chinese tong sui.

In China, the seeds of this species are used to make a variety of herbal teas, in which they are mixed with other ingredients such as sugar, dates, hawthorn berries, licorice, chrysanthemum flowers, lilyturf roots, and jasmine tea. Such herbal teas are believed to reduce bodily "heat", balance bodily fluids, and improve overall health.

=== Malva nuts in traditional Chinese medicine ===
According to Chinese medicine, the use of "Pang Da Hai" can remove heat from the lung, cure sore throats, counteract toxicity, and moisten the bowels. Specific symptoms treated include: hoarseness of voice, dry cough or productive cough with yellow sticky sputum, sore, dry throat due to heat in the lung and constipation with headache and bloodshot eyes. Consume malva nut by adding one or two nuts to a large cup of boiling water and consume the liquid. Typically, in traditional Chinese medicine, malva nut would be part of a larger formula of herbs designed to address a person's condition.

Although it possesses medicinal properties, care must be taken with its consumption. Avoid boiling more than 3 seeds per drink. Excessive consumption of this species can cause watery phlegm, nausea, coughing, and tongue swelling. People with frequent digestion problems and abdominal pain or diarrhea should avoid it entirely.
