= Qiu Li Gao =

Qiu Li Gao (Chinese: 秋梨膏; pinyin: qiū lí gāo) or Autumn Pear Syrup or Sydney Paste is a pear syrup or paste used as a traditional medicine in East Asia, in particular in Chinese food therapy.

== History ==
The preparation was known as early as the Qing Dynasty, when it was mentioned in Yi Xue Cong Zhong Lu (Medicine for the Large General Population) by Chen Xiuyuan (1766-1823).

== Uses and indications ==
The preparation is used to suppress Coughing and Mucus production and to treat breathlessness, Asthma and dry cough. Traditional practitioners believe it "nourishes lung yin, support's the Spleen to clear Phlegm and damp, strengthens the Kidneys holding ability to relieve asthmatic breathless symptoms”.

== Preparation ==
The preparation is made at home and in factories. Commercial products are sold in 12-ounce bottles.

Ingredients include autumn-harvested asian pears, monk fruit, and honey. Sometimes other ingredients such as ginger, jujube, and fritillaria bulbs are included.

== See also ==
- Pear-syrup candy
- Traditional Chinese medicine
