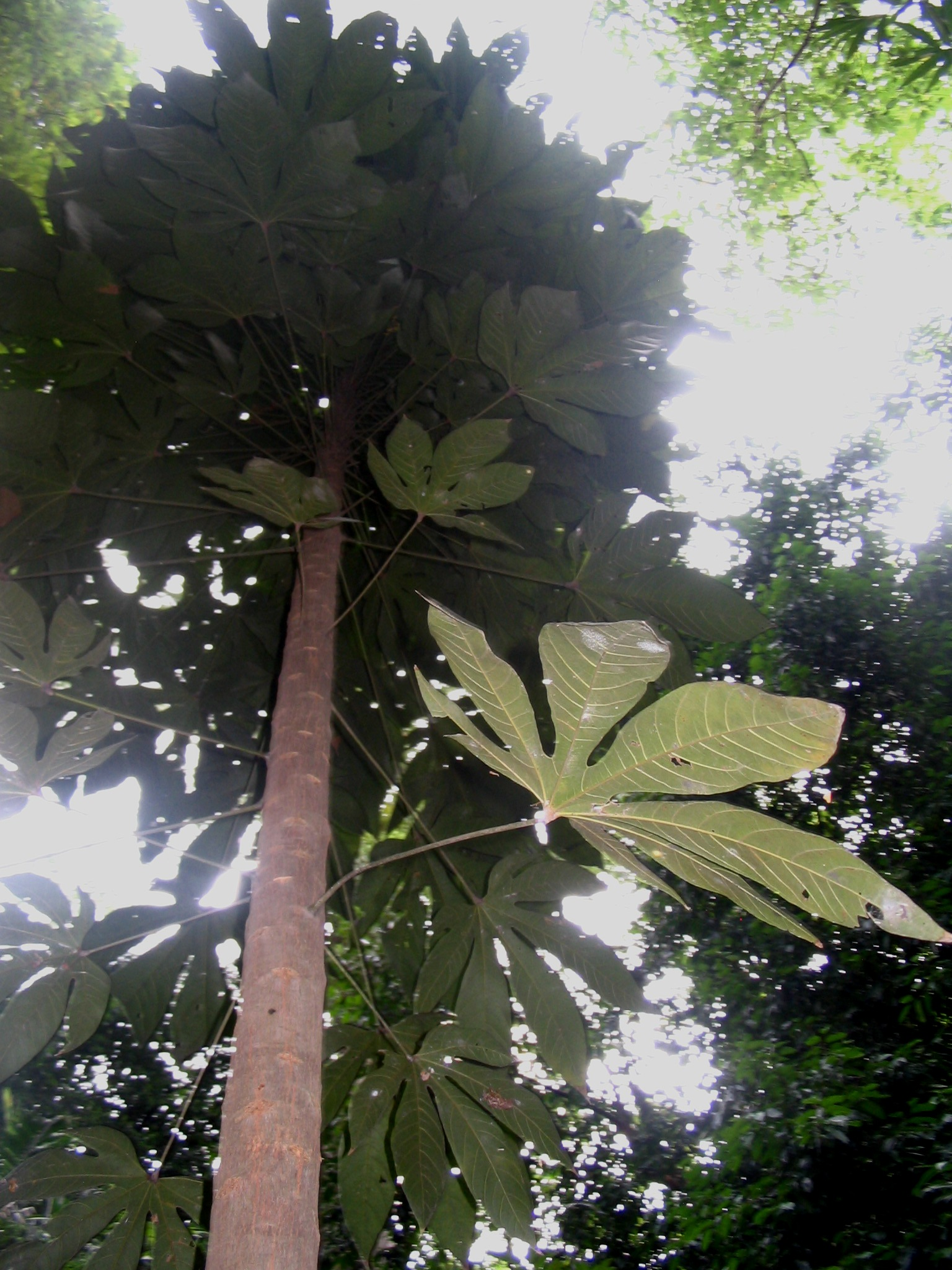

Conservation status
- Vulnerable (IUCN 2.3)

Scientific classification
- Kingdom: Plantae
- Clade: Tracheophytes
- Clade: Angiosperms
- Clade: Eudicots
- Clade: Rosids
- Order: Malvales
- Family: Malvaceae
- Genus: Scaphium
- Species: S. longiflorum

Binomial name
- Scaphium longiflorum Ridl.

= Scaphium longiflorum =

Species of tree

Scaphium longiflorum is a species of plant in the family Malvaceae. It is a tree endemic to Peninsular Malaysia. Scaphium longiflorum (Scaphium; a tropical canopy tree genus.) is mostly present in swamp areas.
