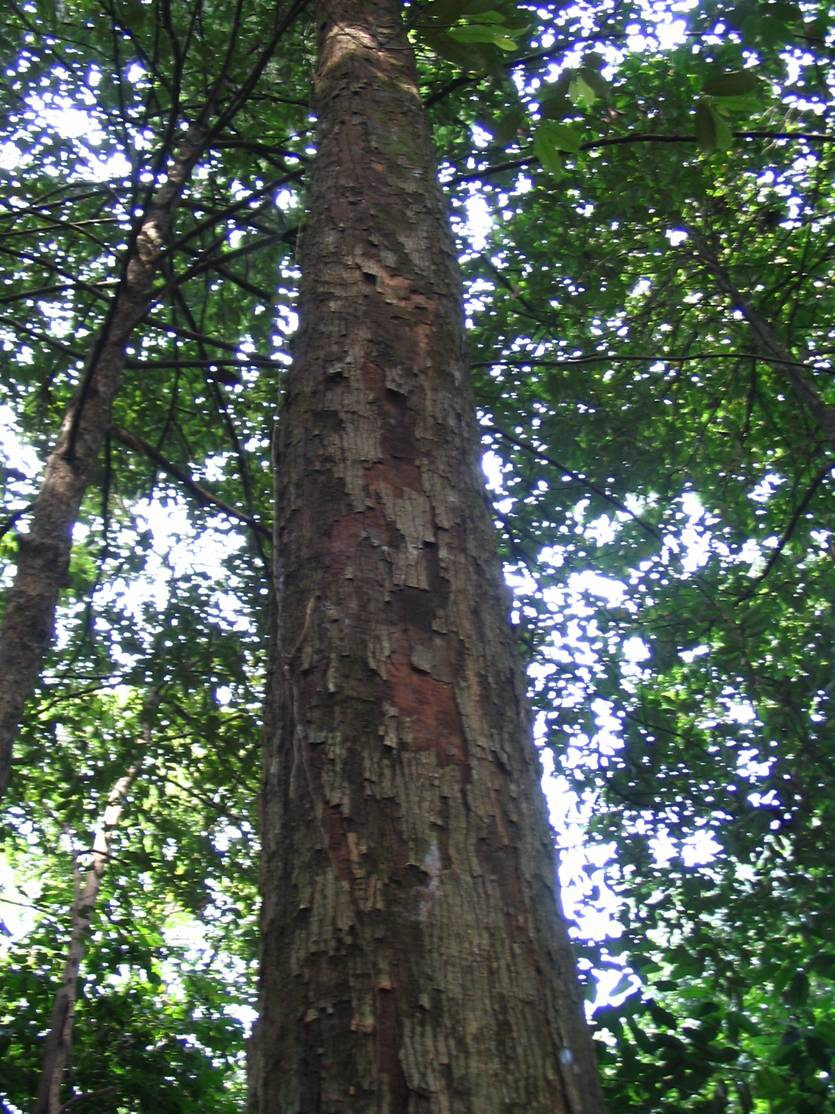
- In Malaysia

Conservation status
- Least Concern (IUCN 3.1)

Scientific classification
- Kingdom: Plantae
- Clade: Tracheophytes
- Clade: Angiosperms
- Clade: Eudicots
- Clade: Rosids
- Order: Malvales
- Family: Malvaceae
- Genus: Scaphium
- Species: S. macropodum

Binomial name
- Scaphium macropodum (Miq.) Beumée ex K.Heyne

Synonyms
- Carpophyllum macropodum Miq.; Firmiana borneensis Merr.; Scaphium borneense (Merr.); Sterculia macropoda (Miq.) Hook. ex Kloppenb.

= Scaphium macropodum =

Species of tree

Scaphium macropodum is a tree species in the family Malvaceae, subfamily Sterculioideae (previously placed in the Sterculiaceae). No subspecies are listed in the Catalogue of Life; there is little concern about its conservation status.

Scaphium macropodum may be known as the "malva nut tree", although this name is also applied to the similar Scaphium affine. It is found in Cambodia, Indonesia, Laos, Malaysia, Singapore, Thailand, and Vietnam (where it is called (cay) ươi). Throughout the region the seeds have commercial value, having traditional medicinal (and culinary) uses: with "cooling" properties especially for treating fevers, phlegm, coughs and sore throats, respiratory conditions, and generally improving health.
