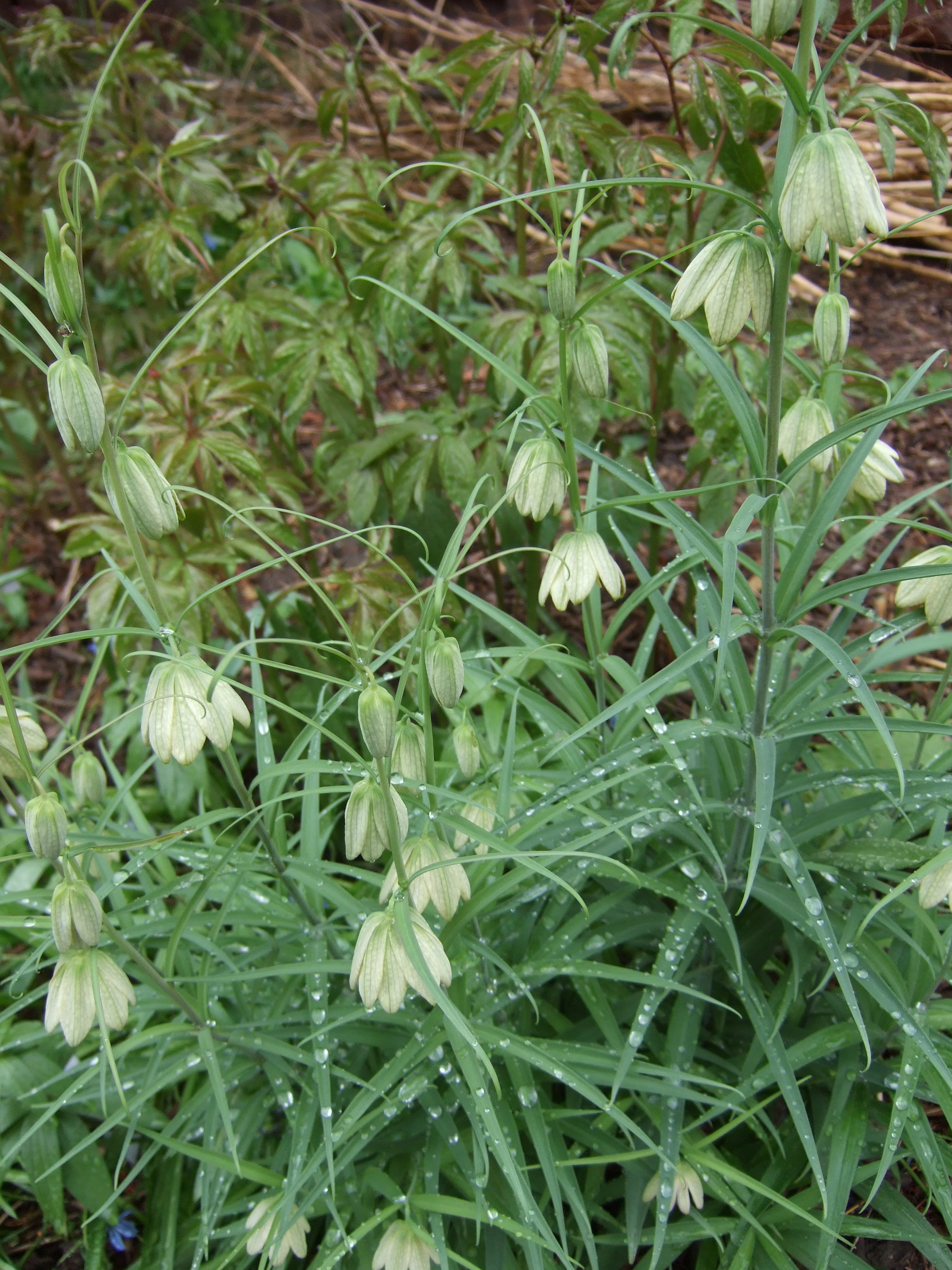
- photographed in Madison, Wisconsin, in the garden of James Steakley

Scientific classification
- Kingdom: Plantae
- Clade: Tracheophytes
- Clade: Angiosperms
- Clade: Monocots
- Order: Liliales
- Family: Liliaceae
- Subfamily: Lilioideae
- Genus: Fritillaria
- Species: F. thunbergii

Binomial name
- Fritillaria thunbergii Miq. 1867

Synonyms
- Synonymy: Uvularia cirrhosa Thunb. 1784, not Fritillaria cirrhosa D. Don 1825; Fritillaria verticillata var. thunbergii (Miq.) Baker; Fritillaria collicola Hance; Fritillaria thunbergii var. chekiangensis P.K.Hsiao & K.C.Hsia; Fritillaria austroanhuiensis Y.K.Yang & J.K.Wu; Fritillaria chekiangensis (P.K.Hsiao & K.C.Hsia) Y.K.Yang; Fritillaria xiaobeimu Y.K.Yang, J.Z.Shao & M.M.Fang

= Fritillaria thunbergii =

Species of flowering plant

Fritillaria thunbergii is a flowering plant species in the lily family Liliaceae. It is native to Kazakhstan and in Xinjiang Province of western China, though cultivated in other places and naturalized in Japan and in other parts of China.

Fritillaria thunbergii produces bulbs up to 30 mm in diameter. The stem is up to 80 cm tall. The flowers are pale yellow, sometimes with a purple tinge or purple markings.

The specific epithet thunbergii honors the Swedish naturalist Carl Peter Thunberg, who collected many plants in Japan in the 18th century.

formerly included

- Fritillaria thunbergii var. puqiensis (G.D.Yu & G.Y.Chen) P.K.Hsiao & S.C.Yu, now called Fritillaria monantha Migo
