= Haw flakes =

Chinese sweets made with hawthorn fruit

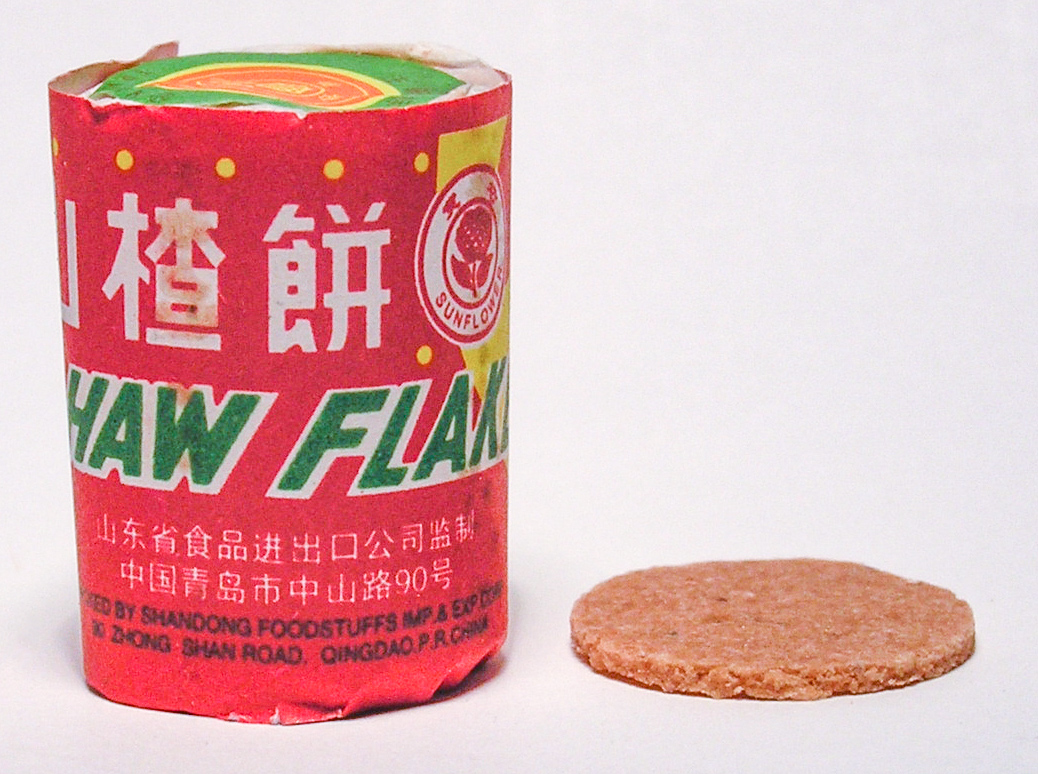
- A packaged stack of haw flakes and an individual haw flake
- Alternative names: shānzhā bǐng, shānzhā piàn
- Type: Confectionery
- Place of origin: China
- Main ingredients: Chinese hawthorn fruit, sugar

Haw flakes
- Traditional Chinese: 山楂餠
- Simplified Chinese: 山楂饼
Transcriptions
Standard Mandarin
- Hanyu Pinyin: shānzhā bǐng
- Bopomofo: ㄕㄢ ㄓㄚ ㄅㄧㄥˇ
- Gwoyeu Romatzyh: shanja biing
- Wade–Giles: shan^{1} cha^{1} ping^{3}
Yue: Cantonese
- Jyutping: saan^{1} zaa^{1} beng^{2}
Southern Min
- Hokkien POJ: san-cha-piáⁿ or sian-cha-piáⁿ

Alternative Chinese name
- Traditional Chinese: 山楂片
- Simplified Chinese: 山楂片
Transcriptions
Standard Mandarin
- Hanyu Pinyin: shānzhā piàn

Haw flakes (Chinese: 山楂餠; pinyin: shānzhā bǐng or Chinese: 山楂片; pinyin: shānzhā piàn) are Chinese sweets made from the fruit of the Chinese hawthorn. They are a light or dark pink candy, usually formed into discs two millimeters thick. They are dry and sometimes crumbly in texture. They are most commonly packaged in cylindrical stacks with label art resembling Chinese fireworks. The sweet and tangy snack is usually served to guests along with tea or as a treat for children. They are sometimes eaten alongside bitter Chinese herbal medicine to aid digestion.

== Variety ==
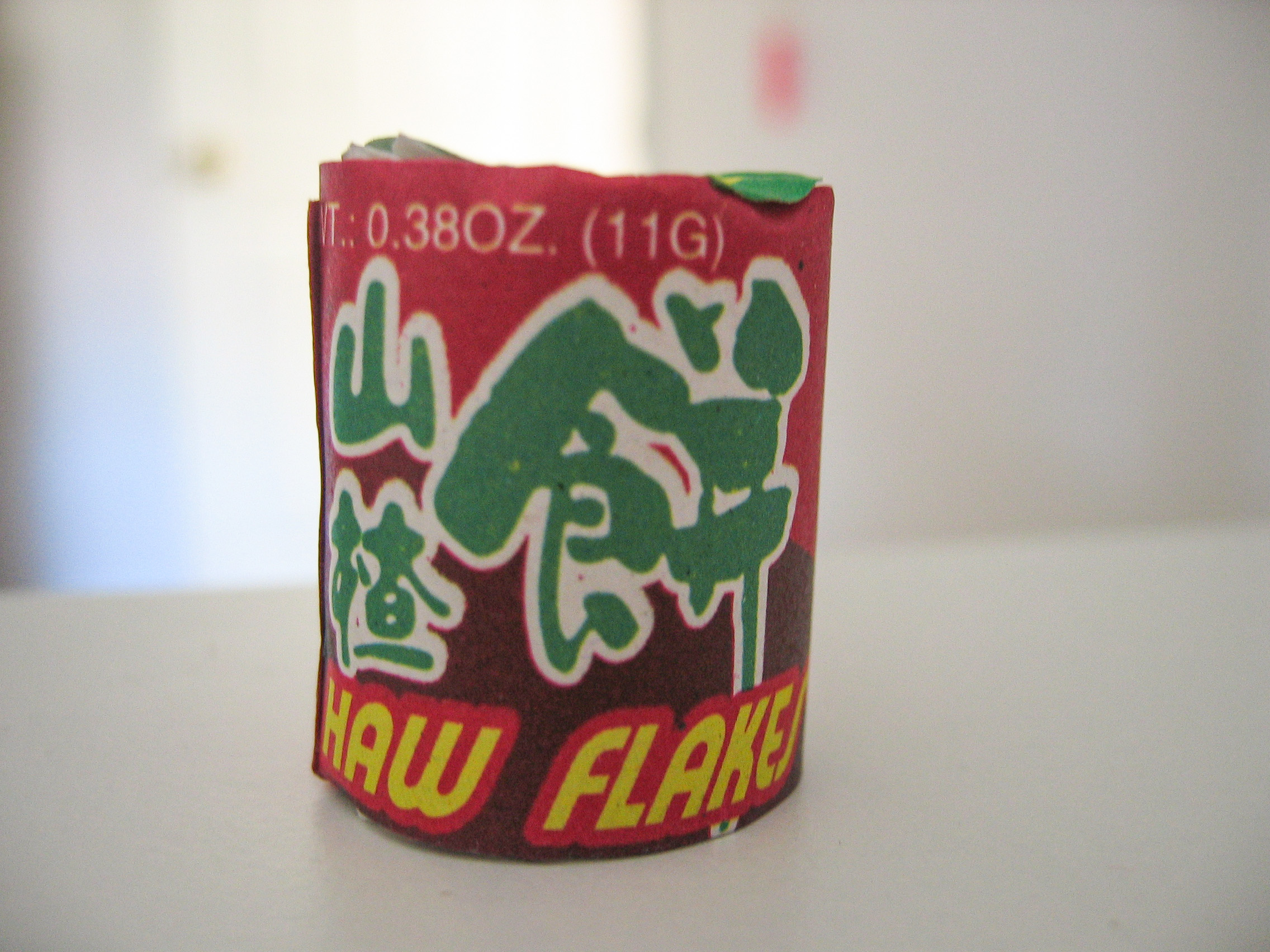
A variant on the typical packaging

Gourmet haw flakes are also available at specialty Chinese markets in the West. Gourmet haw flakes tend to be larger than the regular Shandong haw flakes; gourmet haw flakes are about 35–40 mm in diameter, whereas Shandong haw flakes are about 25 mm in diameter).

Low-sugar and additive-free haw flakes aimed towards the health conscious are readily available in China, but less so in the West. They vary from pale beige to reddish brown in color.

== Regulation ==
Haw flakes have been seized on several occasions by the United States Food and Drug Administration for containing Ponceau 4R (E124, Acid Red 18), an unapproved artificial coloring. Ponceau 4R is used in Europe, Asia and Australia but is not approved by the US FDA.

Currently, certain brands of haw flakes contain Allura Red AC (FD& C #40) as the red coloring. In Europe, Allura Red AC is not recommended for consumption by children. The food coloring was previously banned in Denmark, Belgium, France and Switzerland, but is now approved in the whole EU as food additive E 129.

== See also ==
- List of Chinese desserts
- Tanghulu – traditional Chinese snack consisting of skewers of glazed fruit
- White Rabbit (candy) – popular Chinese brand of milk candy
- Sugar painting – Chinese snack consisting of sugar drizzled into edible shapes
