= Scaphium (beetle) =

Scientific classification
- Domain: Eukaryota
- Kingdom: Animalia
- Phylum: Arthropoda
- Class: Insecta
- Order: Coleoptera
- Suborder: Polyphaga
- Infraorder: Staphyliniformia
- Family: Staphylinidae
- Subfamily: Scaphidiinae
- Tribe: Scaphiini
- Genus: Scaphium; Kirby, 1837

Genus of beetles

Scaphium is a genus of shining fungus beetles in the family Staphylinidae. There are at least two described species in Scaphium.

== Species ==
These two species belong to the genus Scaphium:

- Scaphium castanipes Kirby, 1837^{g b}
- Scaphium immaculatum (Olivier, 1790)^{g}

Data sources: i = ITIS, c = Catalogue of Life, g = GBIF, b = Bugguide.net
