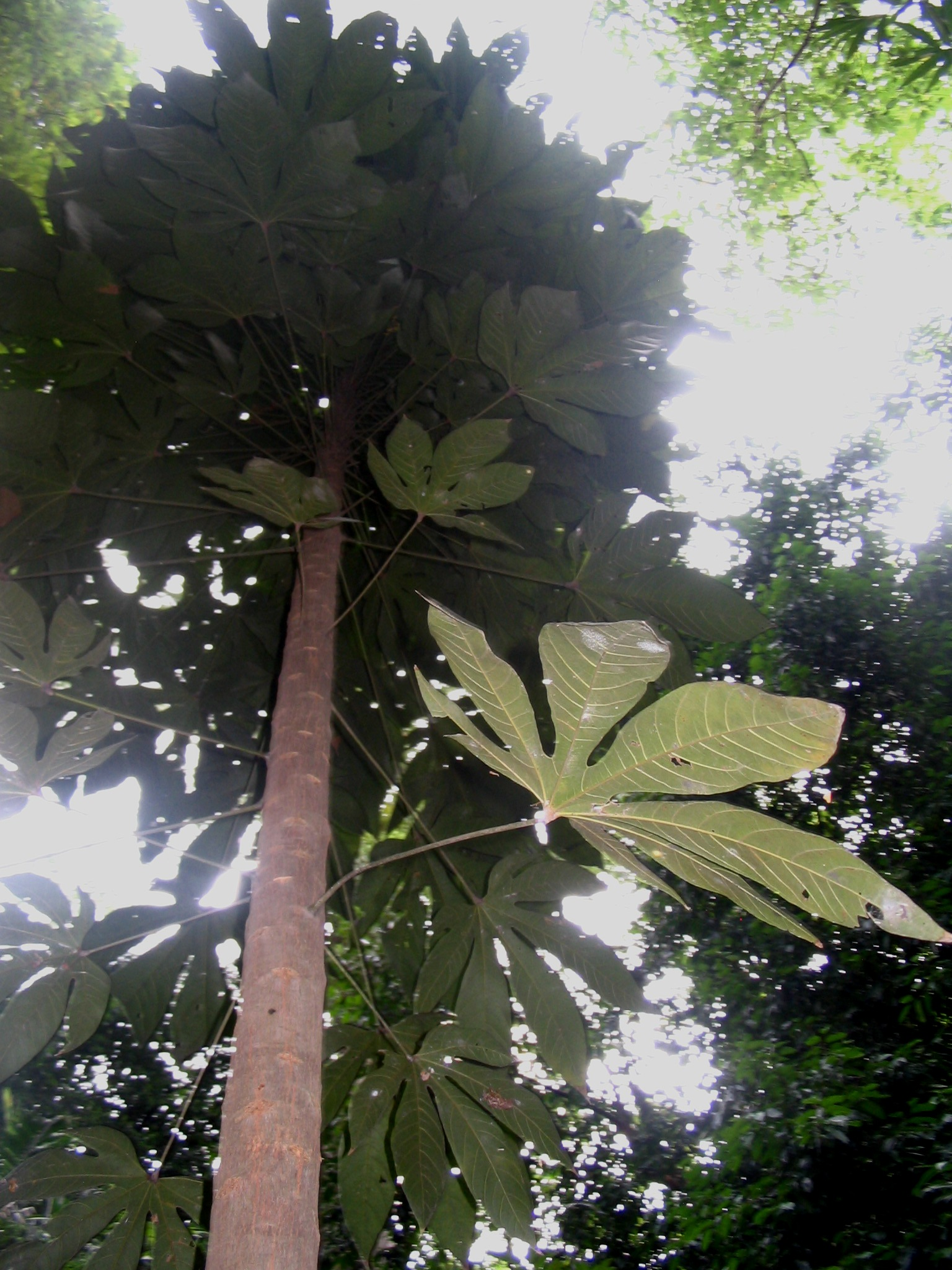
- S. longiflorum in Malaysia

Scientific classification
- Kingdom: Plantae
- Clade: Tracheophytes
- Clade: Angiosperms
- Clade: Eudicots
- Clade: Rosids
- Order: Malvales
- Family: Malvaceae
- Subfamily: Sterculioideae
- Genus: Scaphium; Schott & Endl.

Synonyms
- Carpophyllum Miq.

= Scaphium =

Genus of plants

Scaphium is a genus of about eight species of plants in the subfamily Sterculioideae of the family Malvaceae. The species are native to tropical Asia, ranging from the eastern Himalayas through Indochina to Borneo and Sumatra. The name Scaphium was picked in reference to the shape of the plants' fruit, and is derived from the Greek word for skiff, skaphion (σκάφιον).

== Species ==
Eight species are accepted.

- Scaphium affine (Mast.) Pierre
- Scaphium burkillfilii Kosterm.
- Scaphium linearicarpum (Mast.) Pierre
- Scaphium longiflorum Ridl.
- Scaphium longipetiolatum (Kosterm.) Kosterm.
- Scaphium macropodum (Miq.) Beumée ex K.Heyne
- Scaphium parviflorum P.Wilkie
- Scaphium scaphigerum (Wall. ex G. Don) G.Planch.
