= Scaphium (vessel) =

Ancient Greek vessel

Scaphium (Ancient Greek: Σκάφιον or Σκαφεῖον) was a shallow vessel without a handle. It was named for its resemblance to a small boat (σκάφιον or "scapha" in Greek was a small boat, for example a skiff).

These vessels could be:

- Drinking cup
- Vessel which was used for dipping and pouring water over the body in the bath
- A primitive substitute for a concave mirror or burning-glass used to relight the sacred fire
- Chamber pot
- Concave sundial
- The reservoir of a Water clock
