= Scaphium scaphigerum =

Scientific classification
- Kingdom: Plantae
- Clade: Tracheophytes
- Clade: Angiosperms
- Clade: Eudicots
- Clade: Rosids
- Order: Malvales
- Family: Malvaceae
- Genus: Scaphium
- Species: S. scaphigerum

Binomial name
- Scaphium scaphigerum (Wall. ex G.Don) G.Planch.

Synonyms
- Clompanus scaphigera (Wall. ex G. Don) Kuntze; Sterculia scaphigera Wall. ex G. Don

Species of tree

Scaphium scaphigerum is a deciduous tropical nut-bearing tree of genus Scaphium.

== Uses ==
Seeds of this plant are known as pang da hai in Chinese-speaking countries and are used as herbal remedies in Indonesian and Chinese medicine. Beverages brewed from S. scaphigerum seeds have the consistency of weak tea or higher, and are often drunk together with the boiled pulp of the seed. They are traditionally taken as a restorative to treat loss of the voice from the common cold, flu, laryngitis, and for this reason are a popular refreshment served at Karaoke.
