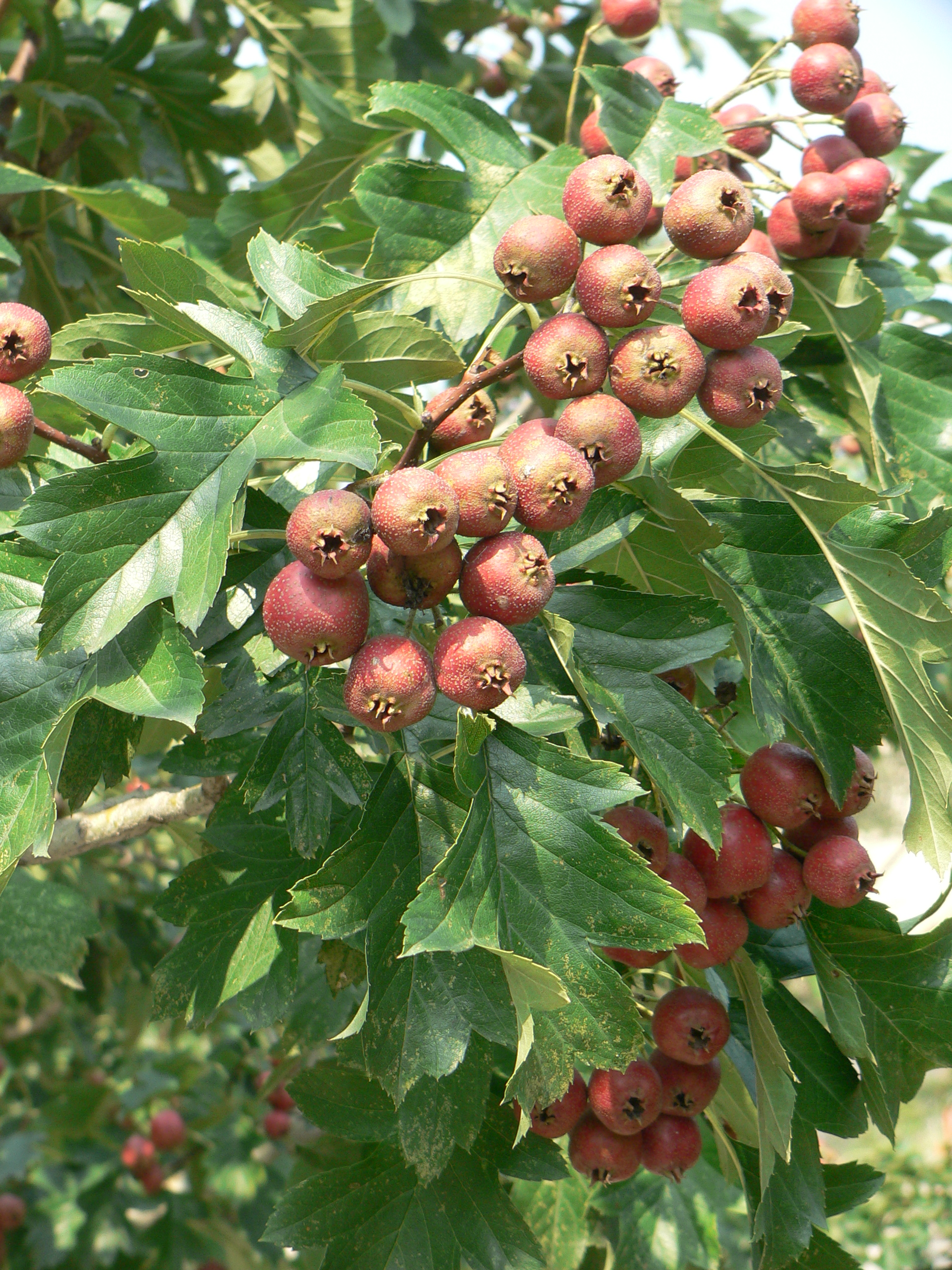

Conservation status
- Least Concern (IUCN 3.1)

Scientific classification
- Kingdom: Plantae
- Clade: Tracheophytes
- Clade: Angiosperms
- Clade: Eudicots
- Clade: Rosids
- Order: Rosales
- Family: Rosaceae
- Genus: Crataegus
- Species: C. pinnatifida

Binomial name
- Crataegus pinnatifida Bunge

= Crataegus pinnatifida =

Species of hawthorn

Crataegus pinnatifida, also known as mountain hawthorn, Chinese haw, Chinese hawthorn or Chinese hawberry, refers to a small to medium-sized tree, as well as the fruit of the tree. The fruit is bright red, 1.5 in (38 mm) in diameter.

== Use ==
=== Culinary use ===
In northern Chinese cuisine, ripe C. pinnatifida fruits are used in the desserts tanghulu and shanzhagao. It is also used to make the traditional candies haw flakes and haw rolls, as well as candied fruit slices, jam, jelly, and wine. It is also traditionally used as a finishing ingredient in Cantonese sweet and sour sauce, although it has since been partially supplanted by ketchup.

=== Traditional medicine ===
In traditional Chinese medicine, the dried fruits of C. pinnatifida have been used as a digestive aid.

== See also ==
- List of culinary fruits
- Phytotherapy
