= Fritillaria monantha =

Scientific classification
- Kingdom: Plantae
- Clade: Tracheophytes
- Clade: Angiosperms
- Clade: Monocots
- Order: Liliales
- Family: Liliaceae
- Subfamily: Lilioideae
- Tribe: Lilieae
- Genus: Fritillaria
- Species: F. monantha

Binomial name
- Fritillaria monantha Migo

Synonyms
- Synonymy: Fritillaria hupehensis P.K.Hsiao & K.C.Hsia; Fritillaria huangshanensis Y.K.Yang & C.J.Wu; Fritillaria lichuanensis P.Li & C.P.Yang; Fritillaria ningguoensis S.C.Chen & S.F.Yin; Fritillaria puqiensis G.D.Yu & G.Y.Chen; Fritillaria wanjiangensis Y.K.Yang, J.Z.Shao & Y.H.Zhang; Fritillaria qimenensis D.C.Zhang & J.Z.Shao; Fritillaria guizhouensis Y.K.Yang, S.Z.He & J.K.Wu

Species of flowering plant

Fritillaria monantha is a Chinese plant species in the lily family Liliaceae. It is found only in China, in the Provinces of Anhui, Henan, Hubei, Jiangxi, Sichuan, and Zhejiang.

This herbaceous perennial produces bulbs up to 20 mm in diameter. The stem grows to 100 cm (39 in) tall. The pendent, nodding flowers are usually yellowish to pale purple, with purple spots.
