= Tanghulu =

Skewers of glazed fruit

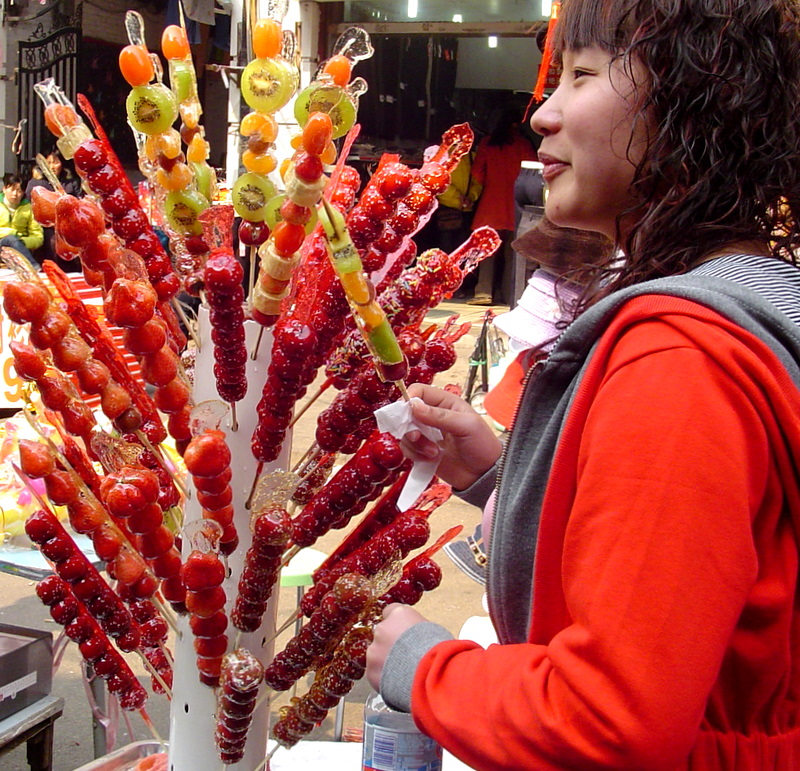
- Traditional bingtang hulu (Shanghai, 2008)
- Alternative names: Bīngtáng húlu, táng húlu, tangdun'er, tangqiu, tangzhan'er
- Type: Confections
- Place of origin: China
- Region or state: Beijing, Tianjin, and other Northern Chinese cities
- Main ingredients: Chinese haw, sugar syrup

Tanghulu
- Traditional Chinese: 糖葫蘆
- Simplified Chinese: 糖葫芦
- Hakka: tongˇ fuˇ luˇ
Transcriptions
Standard Mandarin
- Hanyu Pinyin: tánghúlu
Hakka
- Romanization: tongˇ fuˇ luˇ

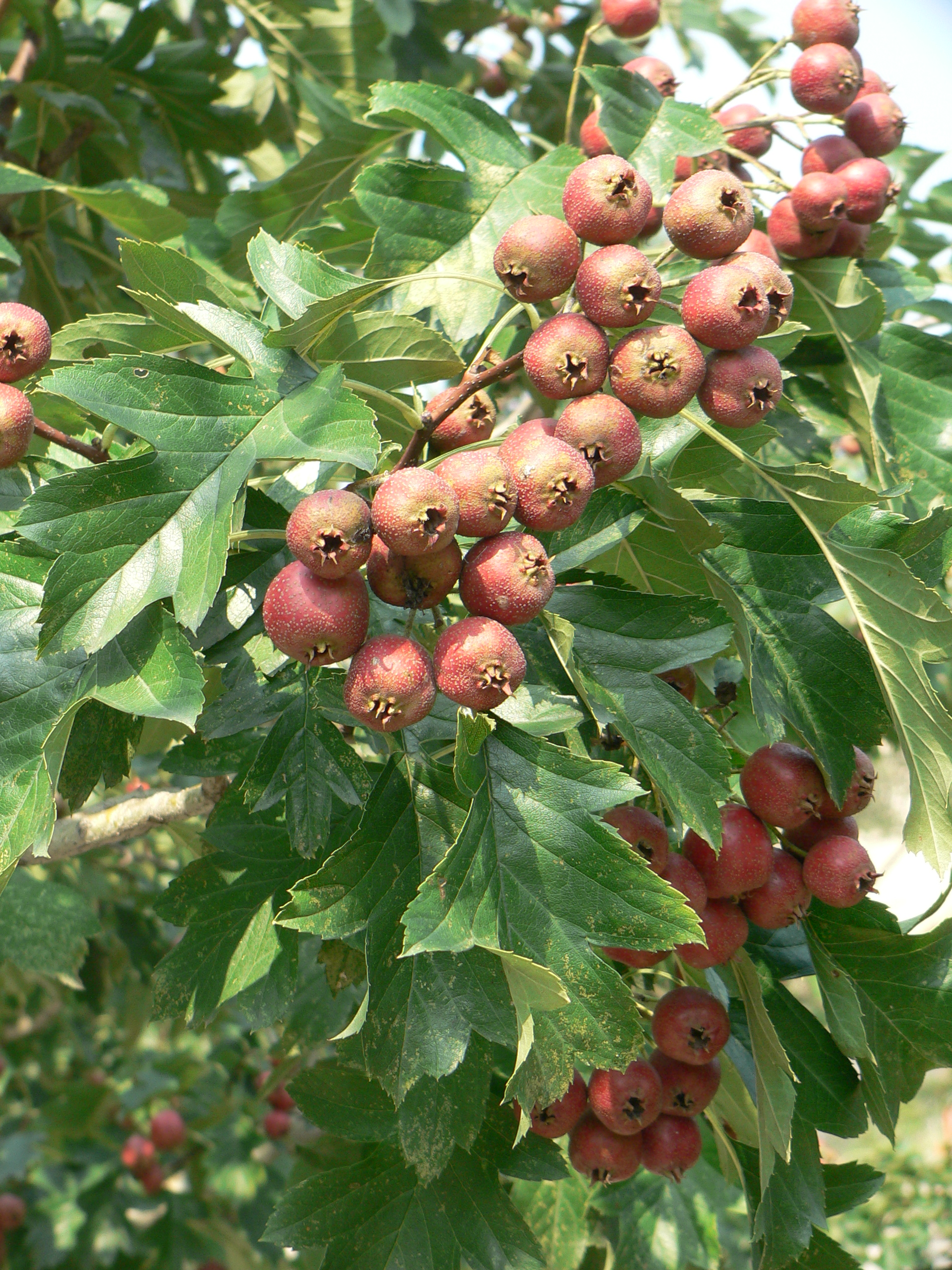
Chinese haw

Tanghulu, (Note: /tɑːŋˈhuːluː/) tang hulu, (Note: traditional Chinese: 糖葫蘆; simplified Chinese: 糖葫芦; pinyin: táng húlu; lit. 'sugar calabash') or bingtang hulu (Note: 冰糖葫蘆; 冰糖葫芦; bīngtáng húlu; 'rock-sugar calabash') is a traditional Chinese snack consisting of several malt sugar coated fruits of Chinese hawthorn (Crataegus pinnatifida) on a bamboo skewer. It is typically made by skewering hawthorn fruits and coating them in heated sugar syrup, which hardens in the cold. It is named for its calabash-like shape. Tanghulu is called tangdun'er (糖墩儿) in Tianjin, tangqiu (糖球) in Fengyang, Anhui, and tangzhan'er (糖蘸儿) in Shandong. Tanghulu is often mistaken for regular candied fruits; however, it is coated in a hardened sugar syrup. Tanghulu has been made since the Song dynasty and remains popular throughout northern China.

Chinese hawthorn is the traditional fruit used, though in ancient times other fruits were also used. In records from the Qing dynasty, grapes and walnuts were added. The pits and seeds of the hawthorn are emptied and are commonly filled with sweet red bean paste before being skewered and dipped. In modern times, fruit choices have become more diverse, such as cherry tomatoes, mandarin oranges, strawberries, blueberries, pineapples, kiwifruit, and bananas.

== Origin ==
Tanghulu is traditionally a Northern Chinese dessert which was prominently famous in Beijing, according to numerous Qing dynasty accounts. Folklore attributes its origin to the Southern Song dynasty, when the emperor Song Guangzong (宋光宗) had a beloved imperial concubine named Huang Guifei. One day, when Huang was sick, she refused to eat or drink all day long, and she seemed about to die at any moment. Palace doctors were puzzled as to how to cure her, resulting in Song Guangzong spending an exorbitant amount of money seeking medical help. Later, a doctor came to the palace and treated Huang. He ordered cooks to prepare the hawthorn with rock sugar, advising Huang to take five to ten of them before each meal. Surprisingly, after a few days, Huang gradually recovered. Everyone thought this method was quite novel, so the prescription was passed down. Later, people began to string the fruit together and sell it on the street. Modern tanghulu is still prepared in the same way, but is skewered on bamboo.

== Nutrition ==
Depending on the fruit used, tanghulu can be rich in vitamin C, pectin and chlorogenic acid, caffeic acid, maslinic acid, oleanolic acid, quercetin, ursolic acid, chrysin, epicatechin and other organic acids and nutritional elements. Chinese hawthorn may have medicinal effects, such as reducing the effects of constipation and dysentery and lowering blood lipids and cholesterol, and its medicinal properties have been widely asserted in Chinese medicine books. However, due to its high sugar content, long-term consumption may be unsuitable for people with diabetes or other health conditions.

Each skewer is reported to contain about 20 to 30 grams of sugar, which is close to the recommended daily sugar intake.

== South Korea craze ==
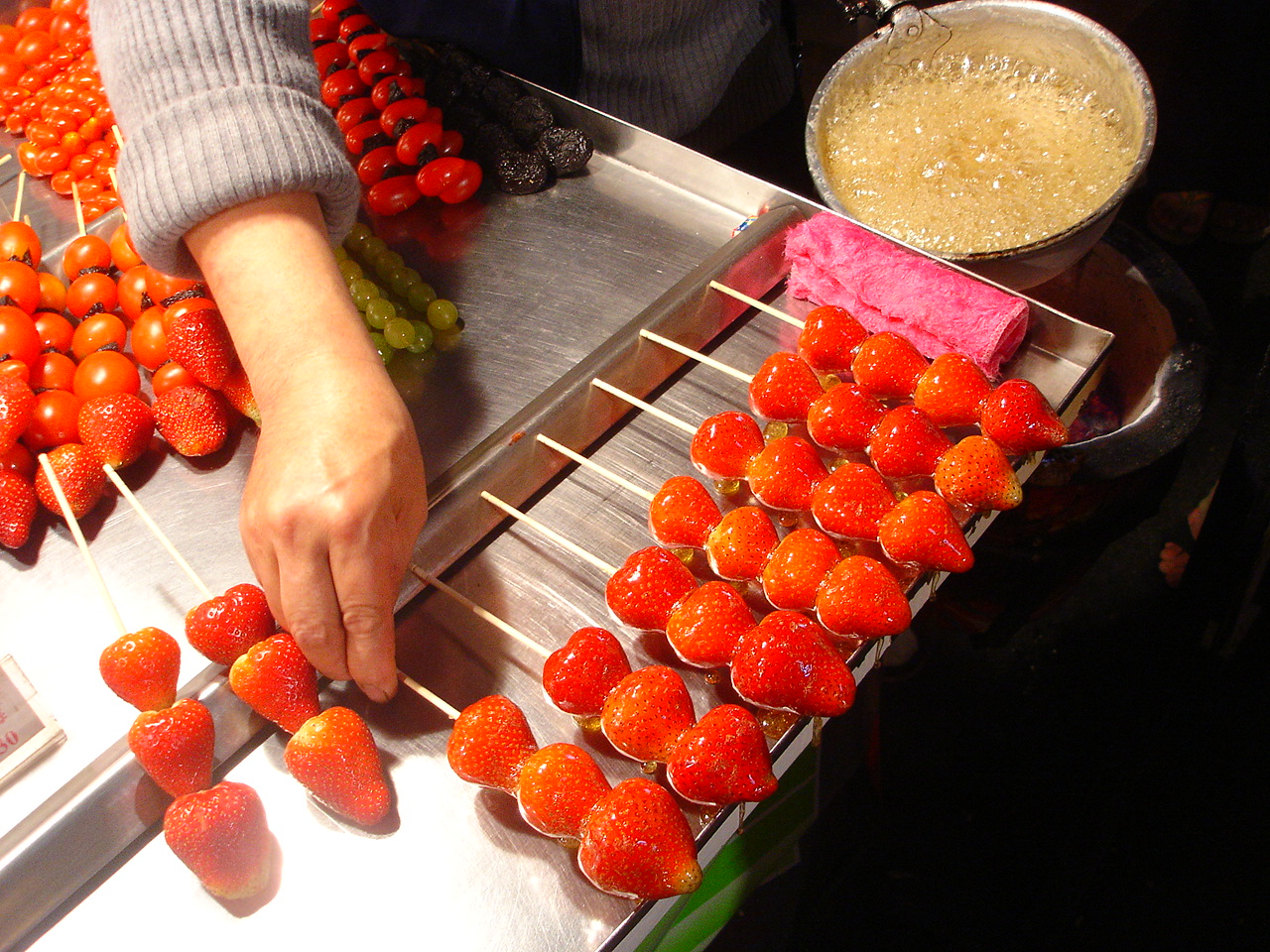
Strawberry Bingtang Hulu

In the 2020s the snack spread to other Asian countries including South Korea; two members of Blackpink made the snack in a documentary and helped accelerate a craze.

=== Problems ===
In 2023, a senator from the Democratic Party of Korea summoned the president of Wangga Tanghulu, one of the leading brands of tanghulu, during a national inspection over the issue of extreme sugar intake and diabetes among children and youth, which had increased 20% just within two years.

Tanghulu skewers and paper cups are often found littered on the streets of South Korea. Even when disposed of properly, skewers pierce garbage bags. Businesses, such as internet cafes, noraebangs, and restaurants, have been seen to display "No Tanghulu Zone" signs, banning people from eating or bringing tanghulu into their establishment due to litter.

Demand declined in 2024 due to changing trends; young people were virally drawn to frozen yogurt, the hot weather made a "sticky mess" of the tanghulu, and customers were concerned about the health consequences of the sugary snack. The Ministry of the Interior and Safety reported that 76 tanghulu stores closed in early May, higher than the number of stores closed at the same time last year.

=== Burn incidents ===
In 2023 to 2024, the Tanghulu recipe became so popular on social media platforms that it became a trend, but a microwave-based preparation method for making the hard candy caused several cases of people suffering burns.

In 2024, Boston hospital Shriner’s Children issued a press release warning about the possibility of severe scald burns as a result of following online recipes to make Tanghulu. The high temperatures required to melt sugar, as well as liquid sugar’s high viscosity can potentially lead to prolonged skin contact and cause deep skin burns that could potentially require skin grafts to heal. Concerns were raised especially over children and teens attempting to make tanghulu without awareness of the potential risks.

One online method involved using a microwave in order to heat the sugar to the hard-crack stage, requiring temperatures of 300 °F (149 °C). Food scientist Ann Reardon warned that under these temperatures microwave-safe plastic and glass containers could melt or shatter, respectively, resulting in high temperature spillage.

== See also ==
- Dango, a similar Japanese dessert, with dough instead of fruit
- Candy apple
- Churchkhela
- Ligao Tang
- List of Chinese desserts
- Lollipop
- Rock candy
