= Hong Kong street food =

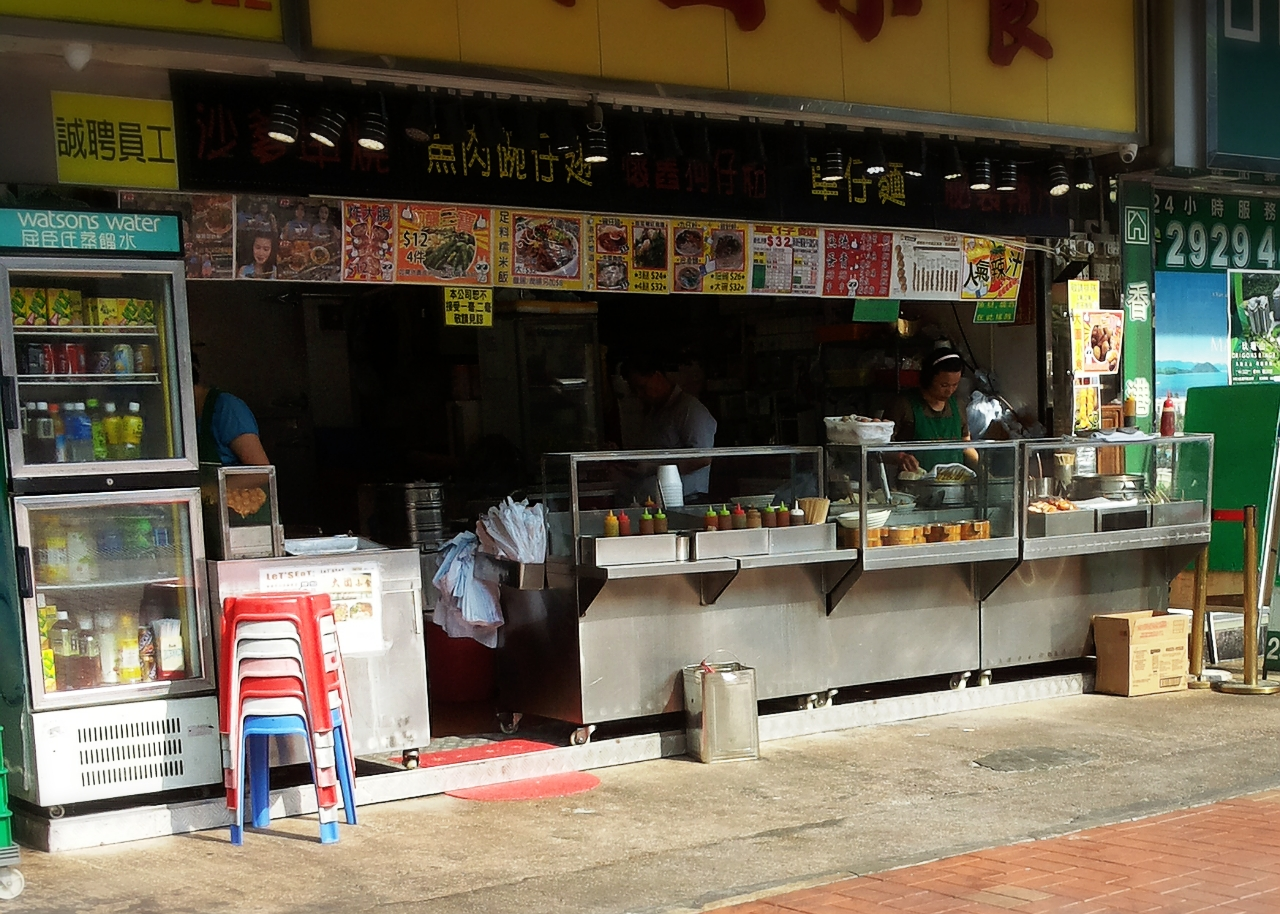
A street food stall in Tai Wai

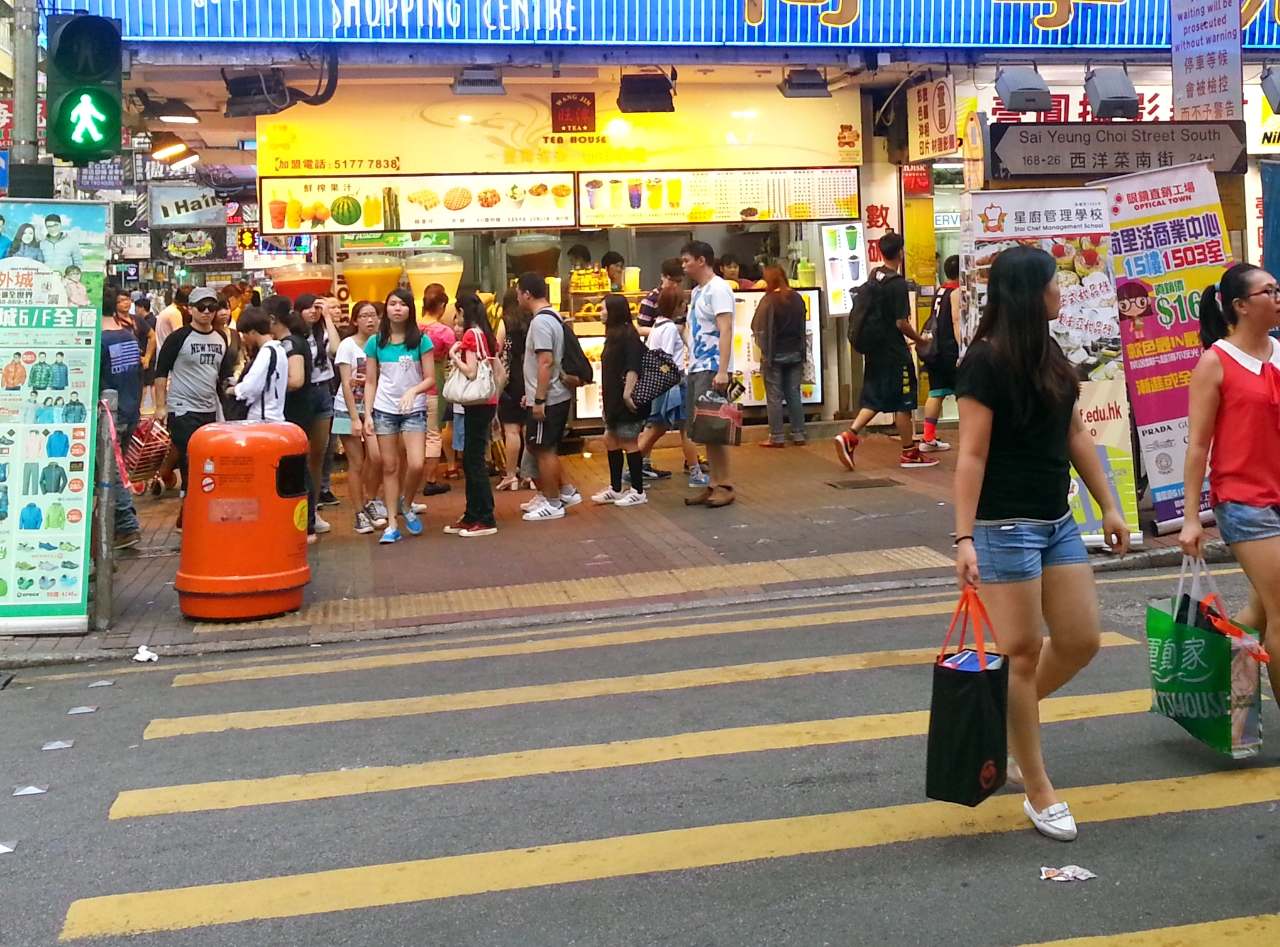
A street food stall in Sai Yeung Choi Street, Mong Kok

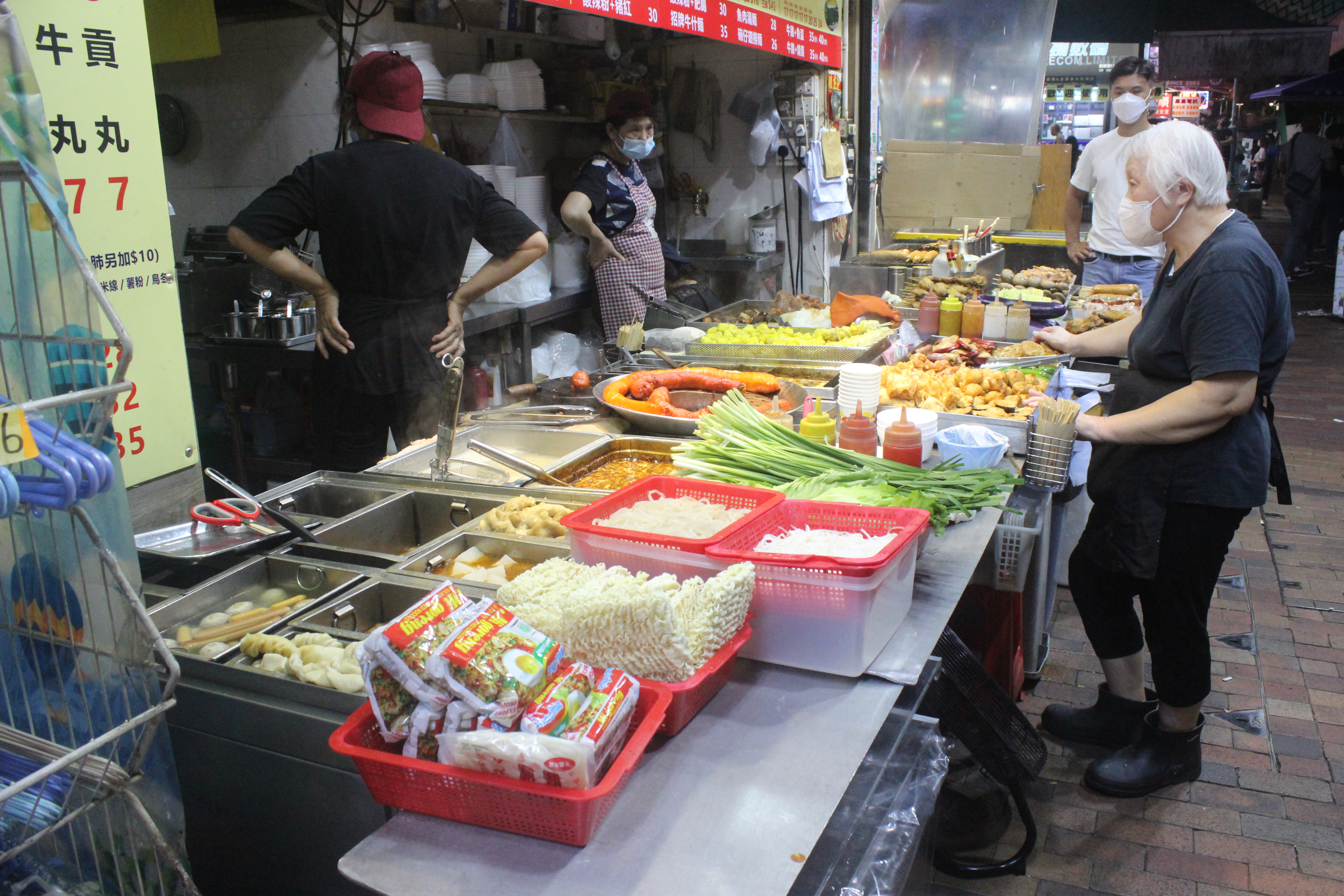
A street food stall in Sham Shui Po

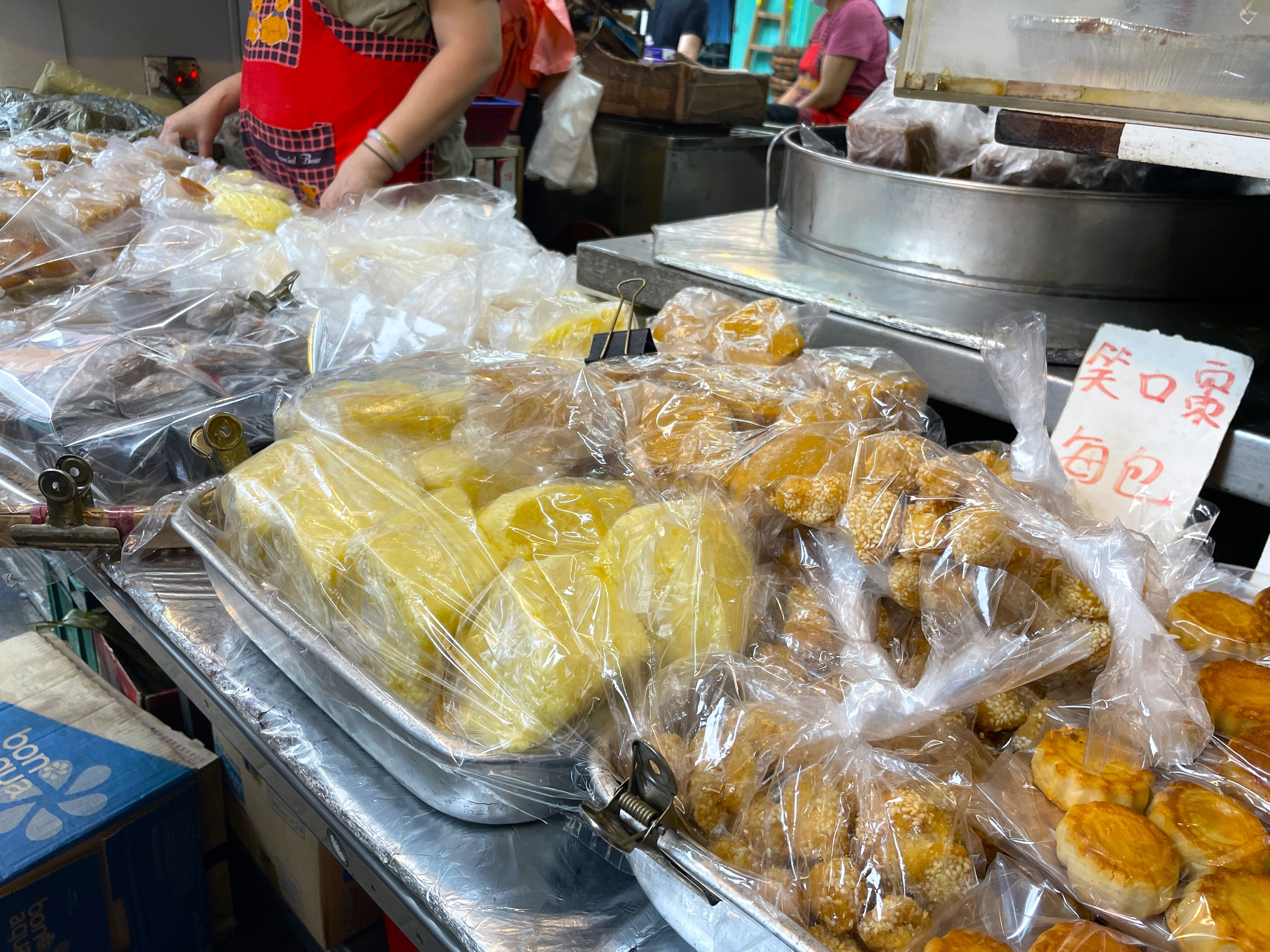
Hong Kong traditional pastries and desserts from Kwan Kee Store, Sham Shui Po

Hong Kong street food is characterised as the ready-to-eat snacks and drinks sold by hawkers or vendors at food stalls, including egg tarts, fish balls, egg waffles and stinky tofu, according to the definition provided by the Food and Agriculture Organization. They can be found throughout the city, especially in the areas of Mong Kok, Causeway Bay, Yuen Long, Tsuen Wan, and Kwun Tong.

== Characteristics ==
Street food is ready to be taken away and eaten elsewhere immediately. Generally, the customers are served snacks, which are contained in polystyrene boxes, with disposable bamboo sticks or plastic utensils. Street food needs to be sold along the street, even though nowadays street stalls have transformed into shops without providing seats. Food can easily be taken away via small plastic bags, paper bags or bowls. The food is prepared quite quickly.

Nutritionists contend that, compared to other food, street food is often cooked in greater quantities of oil, and hawkers usually add large amounts of sugar or salt for seasoning.

According to travel websites Timeout.com and About.com in 2013, food prices averaged between $1 and $25 and were found to be most acceptable to Hongkongers.

Cultural research suggests that food stalls supply a variety of snacks, including both local and international, ranging from red-bean pudding from Guangdong to Thai prawn cutlets.

== History ==
=== Ancient snack stalls ===
According to Tang Zhiyan (Chinese: 唐摭言, "selected words from the Tang"), hawkers had sold cold food on the streets to get relief during summer heat as early as the Tang dynasty. Then, during Qing dynasty, the street-side snack stalls gradually developed into street markets. As highlighted in a feature article namely 'Finding the Dining Habit of the Unemployed' (Chinese: 尋找地踎飲食), the scene of hawkers carrying wood barrels, traditional wares and stoves has become part of the history of local street snacks.

=== Development in 20th century ===
In the 1950s, facing the economic downturn and high unemployment rate, the majority of grass roots were forced to become itinerant hawkers to maintain their livelihood. Owing to the limited resources, rough canopies, cooking stove and wooden carts were used. Considering the effectiveness and convenience, they sold the snacks on mobile carts in the main streets to maximise revenue. During the post-war period, the political stability and economic development of Hong Kong attracted immigrants from Mainland China. At that time, 300,000 of them worked as hawkers, including street food hawkers. The growth in the number of itinerant hawkers fostered the development of street food culture. These hawkers mainly served the lower-income group. These stalls were in form of junkers, a kind of wooden car with wheels, allowing these junkers to be pulled and pushed around. The food was very often cheap in price and with many variations. They became very popular during 1950s to 1960s. However, the Hong Kong government has banned these types of shops in order to build a hygienic image of the society while maintaining public health. Thus, the owners attempted to run their business in a shop instead of utilizing their own junkers. Although the original style of "wooden junkers service" has more or less been changed, the types of food being sold are the same as those in the past.

== Contemporary development ==
From the 1970s to 1980s, several changes concerning the development of street snacks were caused by the following factors.

=== Governmental factor ===
In 1970s, the government adopted an oppressive attitude towards hawkers instead of the laissez-faire approach adopted before. This showed in the change in government policies. For example, the government stopped issuing itinerant hawker licenses to control the number of hawker stalls since 1979. Later, the Urban Council and the Regional Council implemented a policy to eliminate hawkers in 1995. All of the above actions suppressed the prevalence of street food at that time.

=== Hygiene factor ===
Street food does not have a high concern in regards to hygiene. The street snacks contained germs like cholera and Escherichia coli. According to a publicity film released by the Medical and Health Department in 1987, food stalls were considered unhygienic in terms of their environment and cooking process. In the video, a hawker was shown smoking while selling snacks. His stall was located beside a busy road and the floor was wet with rubbish and sewage. This unhygienic condition aroused customer concern, which acted as a catalyst for change. The hawkers do not sell their goods in permitted areas, apply for hawker licenses, or fight for legislation that will make unlicensed hawking a kind of legal activity in the 1970s.

=== Social factor ===
The presence of hawkers contributed to the surge of Mainlanders, who suffered from the end of civil war, mainly after the 1950s. Those people were trying to live a better life in Hong Kong, as an escape of Chinese authority. However, most of the people were not educated, and were often poor. People lived in extremely crammed environments, resulting in many of them choosing to start their “business” in the street, including food selling, singing, and storytelling.

Between the 1960s and 1970s, hawkers increased in popularity. There were over 300,000 people in the industry, accounting for 20% of the labour force. Since there were neither shopping malls nor markets at the time, it provided many opportunities for hawkers to extend their business. The hawkers were then no longer limited to earning a living, but started to pursue better quality of life.

Often crowds surrounding hawkers' carts are seen as causing inconvenience to other pedestrians. In some cases, the elderly might slip as they walked over the puddles, while children might get hurt by the boiled oil from the stalls. The safety concern and disturbance to the public aroused their discontent towards street hawkers.

== Changes made in the contemporary society ==
Over the past few decades, Hong Kong street food has changed its operation.

=== Introduction of new legislation ===
The government has set a quota in the licenses provided. According to the official document, they have let 233 contracts for fixed-pitch hawkers and 93 contracts for itinerant hawkers until 2011. The number of hawkers has decreased compared to 2005, in which there were 1,075 contracts for fixed-pitch hawkers. To maintain a safe and clean environment, the government has also controlled hawking activities through laws. They are listed below:

- Sections 83-86D of the Public Health and Municipal Services Ordinance (Cap.132);
- Hawker Regulation (Cap.132, sub.leg.);
- Food Business Regulation (Cap.132, sub.leg.); and
- Section 4A of the Summary Offences Ordinance (Cap.228).

=== Improvement in hygiene condition ===
Street food is readily available for sale. Hawkers keep their wares boiling during operation to prevent the growth of bacteria.

=== Change in operation mode ===
Due to the limited supply of itinerant licenses and the introduction of a compulsory deletion policy, hawkers have a fixed bunk after moving into shopping malls. The distribution of street snacks was geographically dispersed throughout Hong Kong before. Today, street snacks are mainly located in six districts: Eastern, Central and Western, Wan Chai, Yau Tsim Mong, Sham Shui Po and Kowloon City.

== Importance to Hong Kong ==
=== Local tourism and international recognition ===
The worldwide popularity of local street snacks has fostered tourism in Hong Kong. It is recognised locally and internationally. The Hong Kong Tourism Board website featured street food as “must-eat food.” While for the overseas media, the CNN travel has opened a column especially for Hong Kong street snack. According to a Reuters' article, Hong Kong street food gourmets were ranked the first in the top 10 street-food cities by online travel advisor Cheapflights.com in 2013. In short, the above honour has arisen Hong Kong citizens' appreciation towards the local street food culture.

=== Demonstration of core values in Hong Kong ===
Street snacks have epitomised Hong Kong's core values of cultural diversity, with an emergence of street stalls selling foreign treats like takoyaki and satay. There is a diversity of food options, matching Hong Kong's title of “Gourmet Paradise.”

It can also represent Hong Kong's identity. For example, the name of “Hong Kong-style egg waffle” showed its local origin. The alterable essence of local street food has demonstrated Hong Kong’s cultural acceptance and serves as a medium to display its character to the world.

In 2015, a marked rise in nativist sentiment led to the growing influence of localist parties such as Civic Passion and Hong Kong Indigenous. Localists, feeling that street vendors — who generally represented the lower class of Hong Kong society — were being increasingly oppressed by a government colluding with commercial interests and property owners, offered high-profile support for the traditional Lunar New Year Kweilin Street Night Market in 2015 when it was targeted for closure by the CY Leung administration. On the eve of Lunar New Year in 2016, FEHD inspectors carried out a preemptive raid against street vendors in Sham Shui Po, making arrests and seizures. This led to the 2016 Mong Kok civil unrest, where nativists defended stall holders from being victimised by FEHD inspectors and engaged in confrontations with the police.

== List of common Hong Kong street food ==
Name	Image	Description
Fish balls 魚蛋		Fish balls are usually served in curry and sold on skewer.
Siu mai 燒賣		Also called shumai. Different from the dim sum served in Chinese restaurants. It does not include any ingredient other than fish meat and pork. Siu mai even has its encyclopedia, as three Hongkongers administrate a popular Facebook page called “Hong Kong Siu Mai Concern Group.” The group frequently shares food reviews and information on the best siu mai across the city. At the same time, the page also posts submissions from other enthusiasts, who sometimes create peculiar recipes such as putting siu mai in a salad.
Imitation shark fin soup 碗仔翅		Mushrooms, vermicelli, and scrambled egg are commonly used as the major ingredients. It is a tradition to add red vinegar in the soup when eating it.
Fried chestnuts 炒栗子		Chestnuts are stir-fried with black sand and sugar in a wok.
Egg waffles 雞蛋仔		Made by stirring eggs, sugar, and flour as a pulp, then baking it until it turns a golden colour. It is crunchy on the outside and soft on the inside.
Put chai ko 砵仔糕		Palm-sized, steamed in a porcelain bowl.
Stinky tofu 臭豆腐		Deep-fried, smells stinky after natural fermentation.
Baked waffles 格仔餅		Peanut butter, butter, sugar and condensed milk are put together in the two waffles.
Beef offal 牛雜		Braised beef offal, including tripe, lungs and intestine.
Fried squid tentacles 炸魷魚鬚		It is pre-pickled till the outside become orange. The texture is like a rubber. It is conventional to dip it in black vinegar when served.
Deep-fried pig intestine 炸大腸		It is cut into slices and placed on a bamboo skewer. The outer side is fried until orange colour and the inside is filled with grease and fat.
Roasted sweet potatoes 煨蕃薯		Soft and piping hot; regarded as a good wintertime snack.
Three fried stuffed treasures 煎釀三寶		Stuffed eggplant, stuffed bell pepper, and stuffed bean curd.
Traditional Candy and Coconut Wrap 糖蔥餅		A traditional Cantonese snack wrap with hard sugar and coconut inside a white wafer slice.
Tofu Pudding 豆腐花		The pudding can be served hot or cold with brown sugar.
Maltose Crackers 麥芽糖夾餅		This snack is made of two pieces of crackers stuffed with sticky sweet maltose in the middle, rolled up on a thin strip of bamboo.
Dragon beard candy (龍鬚糖)	Dragon's beard candy	It is a handmade traditional snack made of stretched sugar strands, wrapped around peanuts, coconut, and sesame seeds.

== See also ==
- Hawkers in Hong Kong
- List of street foods
- Mobile stalls in Hong Kong
- Kam Wing Tai Fish Balls
