= Mobile stalls in Hong Kong =

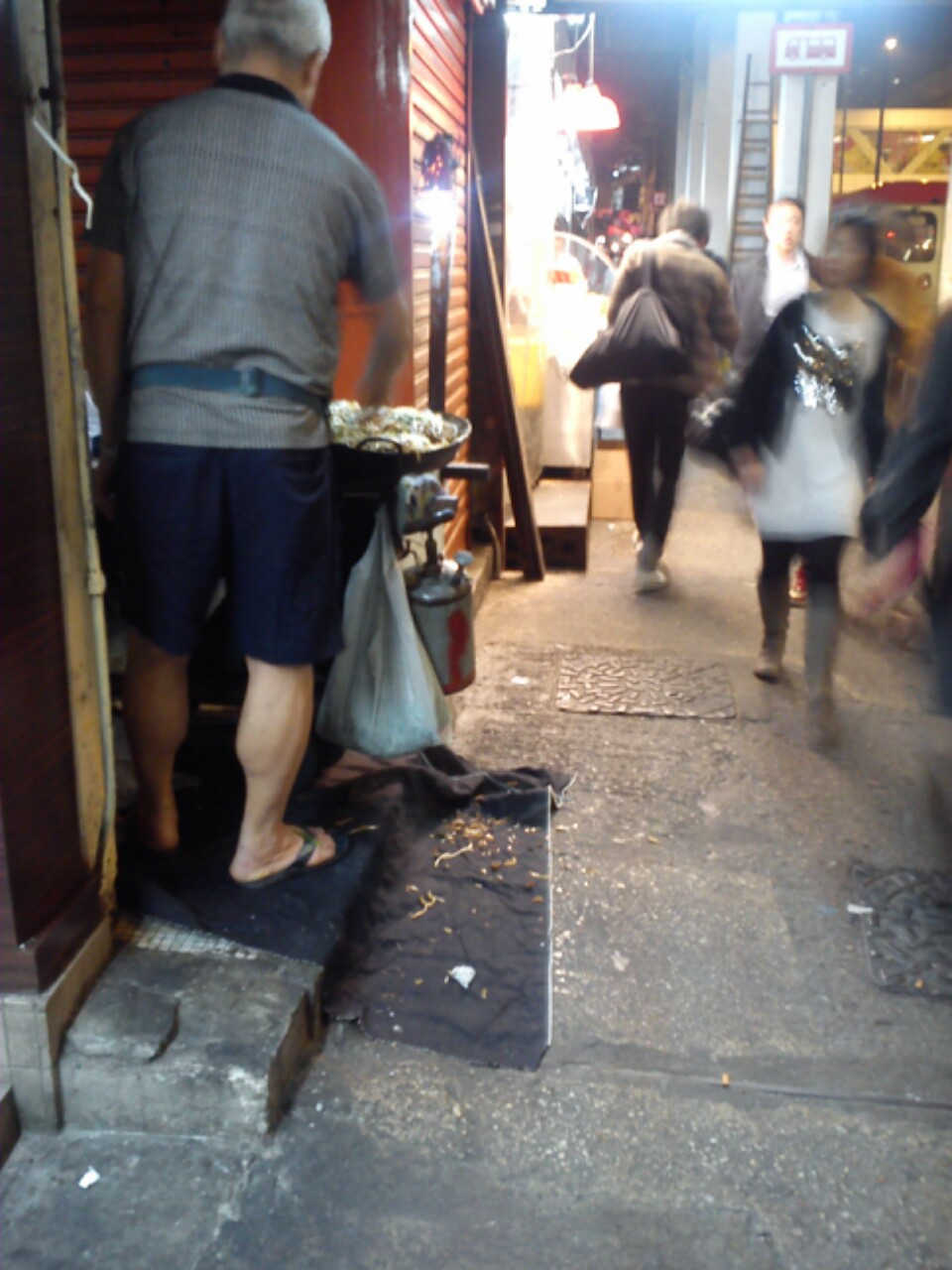
An owner of a mobile stall in Kwun Tong

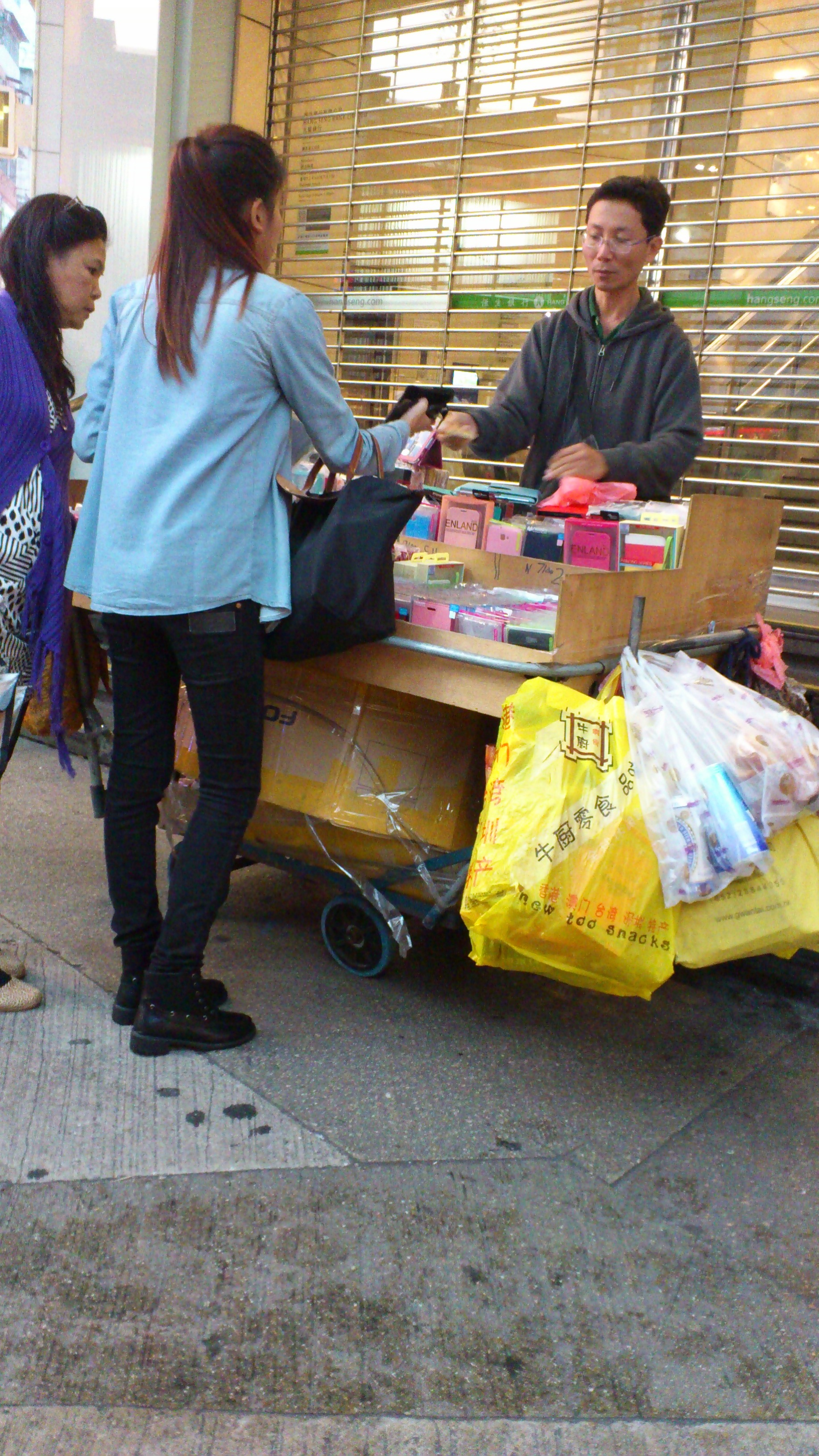
A mobile stalls selling mobile phone cases in Mong Kok

In Hong Kong, mobile stalls (Chinese: 車仔檔) are used by the street hawkers to sell inexpensive goods and street food, like eggettes, fishballs and cart noodles since the 1950s. This style of selling is part of Hong Kong traditional culture. It reflects people’s ways of living and their spirits. In recent years, the operation of the mobile stalls faces challenges because of government policies and modernisation.

== History ==
Hong Kong experienced economic downturn in the 1950s, meanwhile, refugees from the Mainland fled to Hong Kong constantly after the establishment of the People's Republic of China, leading to an increase in population. People struggled to make a living, they started to operate mobile stalls using wooden carts with low production costs. With the portable carts, street vendors could get away in time from being arrested by the police. In the 1970s and 1980s, a wide variety of products were sold then. Besides food and snacks, household goods, clothing and kitchenware could be found in the mobile stalls. They are mostly located in Sham Shui Po and Mong Kok.

== Features ==
The mobile stalls sell mainly two kinds of products, street food and clothes. Some traditional street food such as eggettes, curry fish balls and fried chestnuts are favored by teenagers. These $10-odd snacks are cheap but delicious. They smell and taste good so people are willing to line up and wait for them. The mobile stalls owners make the snacks once they are ordered so as to keep them hot and fresh. Apart from the street snacks, the carful also sells clothes, sometimes handbags and other accessories. Women love buying free-sized leggings and socks. Though customers cannot try the products on, they are willing to buy them.

== Owners and locations ==
There are mainly two types of owners which are the unemployed middle-aged and the unlicensed hawkers. Both of them are the main support of their family while they cannot secure their jobs. As a result, they choose to run the mobile stalls so they can make a decent living and avoid paying high rents. The mobile stalls are operated by family units. Most of the mobile stalls can be found near the public housings, schools and MTR stations, because a steady stream of people in these places helps increase their business turnover.

== Relationship with Hong Kong ==
The mobile stalls reflect Hong Kong's traditional values of diligence and a fast-paced lifestyle. With a small amount of capital and time, owners can earn a huge profit from the day's sales by moving their carts around without paying high rents. This traditional hawking style is threatened by government policies and modernisation. Under the law, unlicensed hawking is prohibited and many mobile stalls have been demolished; the government nevertheless sets up markets in different districts like Tin Sau Hui (天秀墟) and Wan Chai Tai Yuen Street (太原街) where mobile stalls continue to gather. Some citizens support the government’s plan since they think it is more hygienic and peaceful without the mobile stalls on the streets, while others object to government policy.

== See also ==
- Hong Kong street food
- Hawkers in Hong Kong
