= Stuffed peppers =

Dish involving filling the cavities of a bell pepper with other food

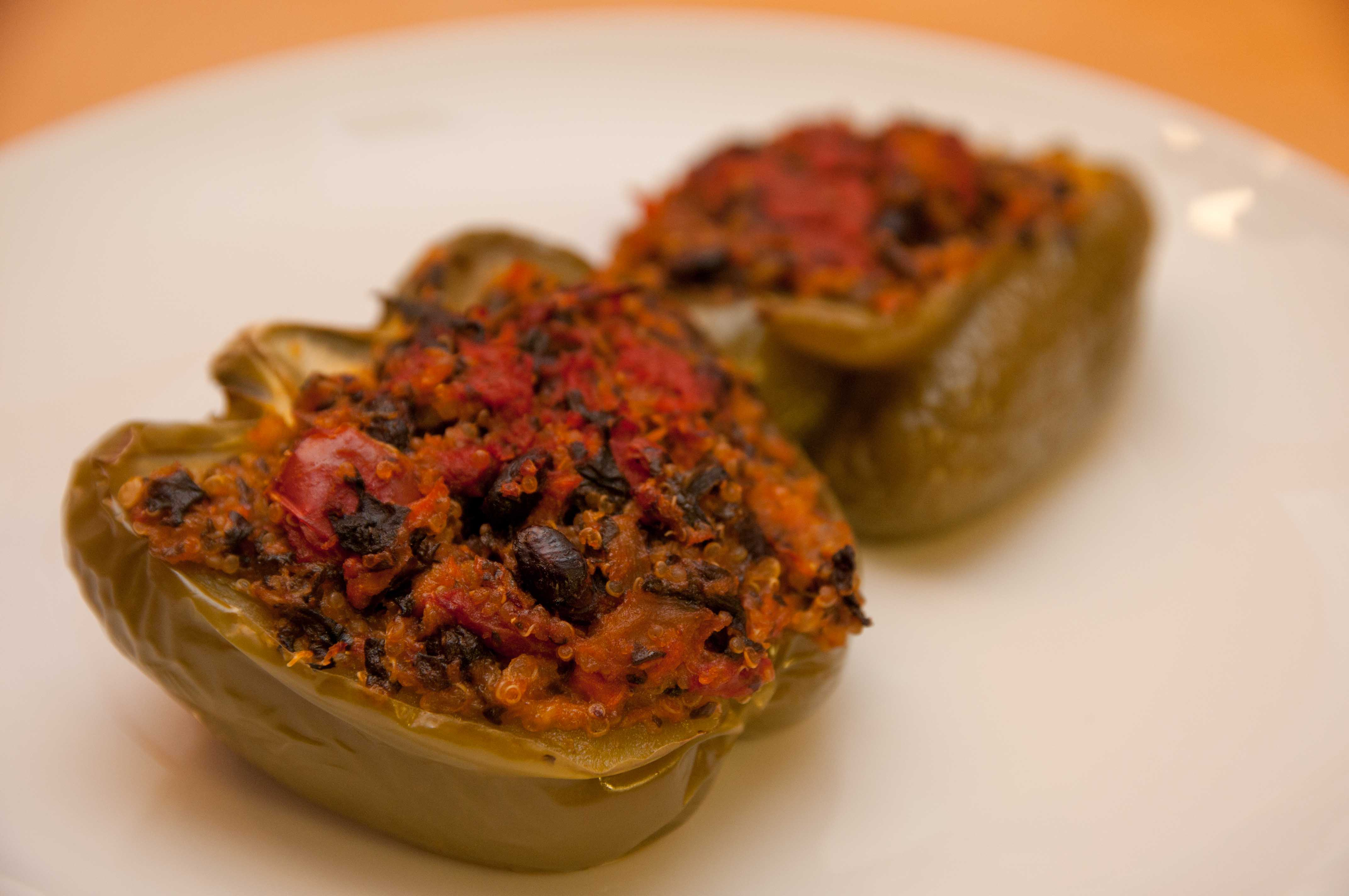
- Main ingredients: Peppers

Stuffed peppers is a dish common in many cuisines. It consists of hollowed or halved bell peppers filled with any of a variety of fillings, often including meat, vegetables, cheese, rice, or sauce. The dish is usually assembled by filling the cavities of the peppers and then cooking.

== Regional variations ==
=== China ===
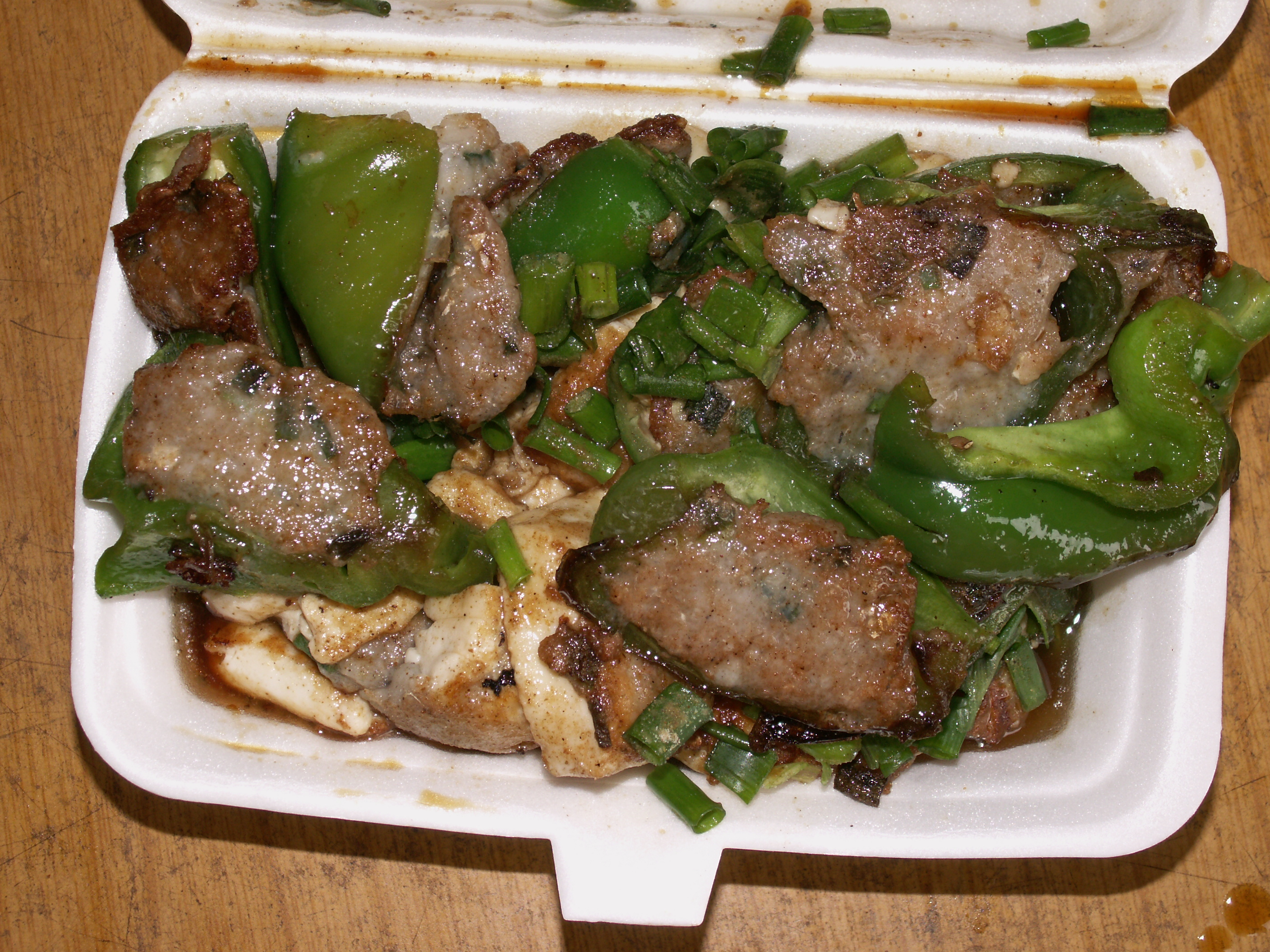
Three Fried Stuffed Treasures in a polystyrene foam box, Hong Kong

The Cantonese version of stuffed peppers is part of a street food called Three Fried Stuffed Treasures (煎釀三寶), with stuffed peppers, stuffed aubergines, and stuffed sausage. Though with different vegetables and meat, the stuffing is all the same: dace fish paste. After assembling the fish paste, it is deep-fried. It is usually served with Worcestershire sauce, or can be served without sauce.

=== Spain ===
Stuffed peppers or pimientos rellenos are part of traditional Spanish cuisine, especially that of the region of the Basque Country. Usually piquillo peppers are used. The fillings might include Manchego cheese, chicken, or cod in a red sauce, with chicken likely being the most popular recipe.

=== Italy ===
Stuffed peppers or peperoni ripieni are part of the Italian gastronomic tradition with its numerous regional recipes. The traditional Calabrian recipe, called pipi chini, involves the use of round bell peppers, and the filling is made with breadcrumbs, parsley, basil, Grana cheese, tomato, and provola cheese. Sometimes hard-boiled egg, anchovies or ground meat are also added.

=== Egypt ===
In Egypt, a stuffed bell pepper dish called mahshi felfel (محشي فلفل) is traditionally eaten, it is a type of dolma in which bell peppers are filled with a mixture of rice and herbs. The filling is typically made from short-grain rice, combined with finely chopped parsley, cilantro, and dill, seasoned with cumin, coriander, salt, and black pepper. Some versions may incorporate ground beef or lamb, but this is not typical.

Before cooking, the stuffed peppers are arranged in a pot lined with tomato slices or onion rings, preventing them from sticking. They are then simmered in a seasoned tomato sauce, allowing the rice to absorb the flavors while the peppers become tender.

=== India ===
Stuffed peppers (bharvan mirch or bharva hari mirch) is one of several stuffed vegetable (bharvan subji) dishes. It consists of bell peppers stuffed with cooked meat, potatoes, and onions and seasoned with chili, turmeric, coriander, cilantro, salt, and lemon juice. The peppers are then either browned in a tava (frying pan) or baked in an oven until the peppers are scorched.

Mirchi bajji or pakora is a chaat (street food) item and is a hot favorite during the monsoon and cooler months. In Mumbai and western areas, the big green chilli pepper is stuffed with a roasted, spiced flour mix and fried. In the South, the big green chillies, similar to Hatch chili peppers, are dipped in a flour batter and fried. It may be accompanied by chutneys and sauces. In Andhra Pradesh and Tamil Nadu, some of the smaller but more potent chillies are also stuffed and fried, especially as a side to rice.

=== Middle East ===
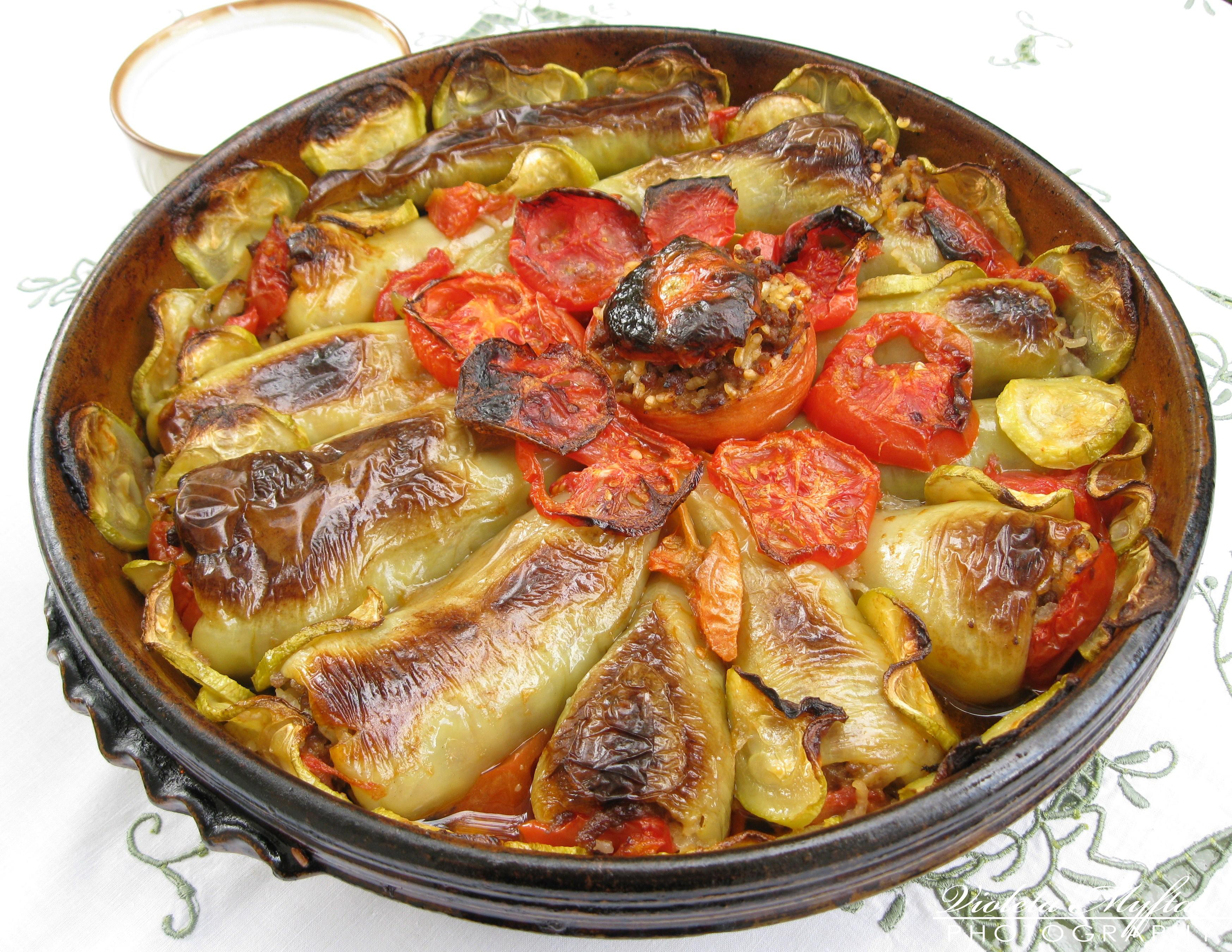
Tray of whole stuffed peppers

Dolma is a family of stuffed dishes from the Middle East that can be served warm or cold. Some types of dolma are made with whole vegetables including whole peppers. Today, dolma are found in the cuisines of the Balkans, South Caucasus, Central Asia, Levant, and the family cuisines of Sephardic and Iraqi Jews. Dolma dishes are found in Balkan, Greek, Arab, Israeli, Turkish, Central Asian, Armenian and other Caucasian cuisines. This dish was popular in the ancient world, although under different names, like the Ancient Greek thrion. In medieval and early modern ages, this dish was part of the Ottoman palace cuisine. The word dolma, of Turkish origin, means "something stuffed".

=== North America ===
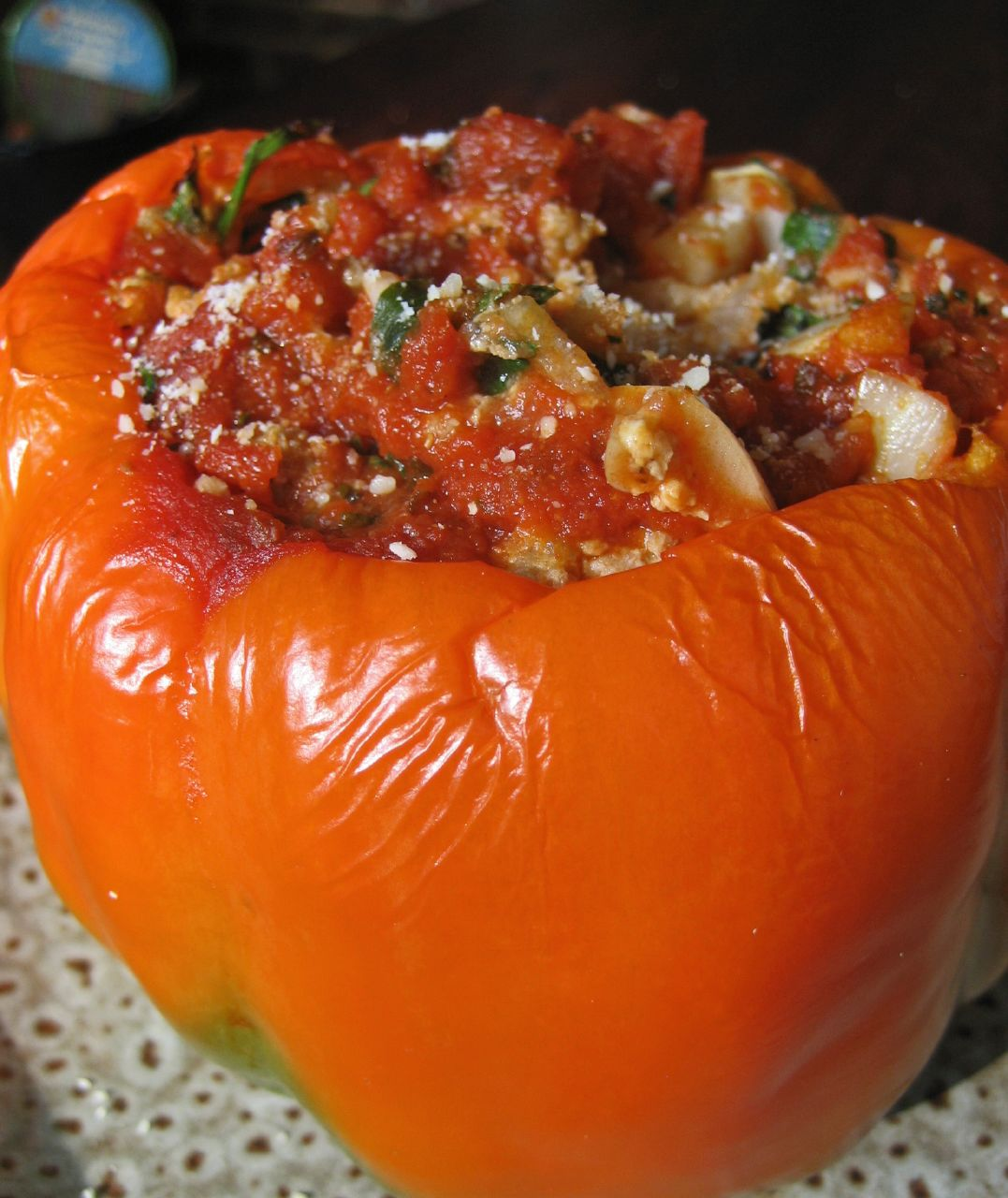
American stuffed pepper

Stuffed peppers in American cuisine is a dish where bell peppers (often the green, yellow, orange, and red varieties) are typically filled with a stuffing such as ground beef, mixed with bread crumbs or cooked rice, eggs, herbs, and spices (especially paprika and parsley) and cheese. Recipes vary but often include hollowing out the peppers, stuffing them, covering them with cheese, and baking or alternatively cooking them on the stove top at a slow simmer in canned tomato sauce until the peppers are soft. A sauce may be served with them, often a tomato sauce, but this, too, varies greatly.

Mexican and “Tex-Mex” cuisine has more than one stuffed pepper dish:

- The chile relleno, literally "stuffed pepper", consists of a roasted and peeled/skinned green pasilla or poblano pepper stuffed with cheese (traditionally queso fresco) and, occasionally, minced meat, covered in an egg batter, and fried. It is often served covered with a sauce, although the type of sauce varies widely. It is sometimes also served in a taco with rice, salsa and other toppings. This is also a popular offering at Tex-Mex restaurants in the southwestern U.S., but often cheddar cheese replaces the queso fresco.
- Jalapeño poppers are jalapeño peppers that have been hollowed out, stuffed with a mixture of cheese, spices, and sometimes ground meat, and then deep fried. The dish is common in Tex-Mex cuisine and less so in true Mexican cooking.

=== Guatemala ===
In Guatemala, the "pimiento" pepper is stuffed with shredded pork and vegetables. As the Mexican version, it is covered with egg batter and fried. It is served with tomato sauce or inside a bread bun.

=== Eastern and Southeastern Europe ===
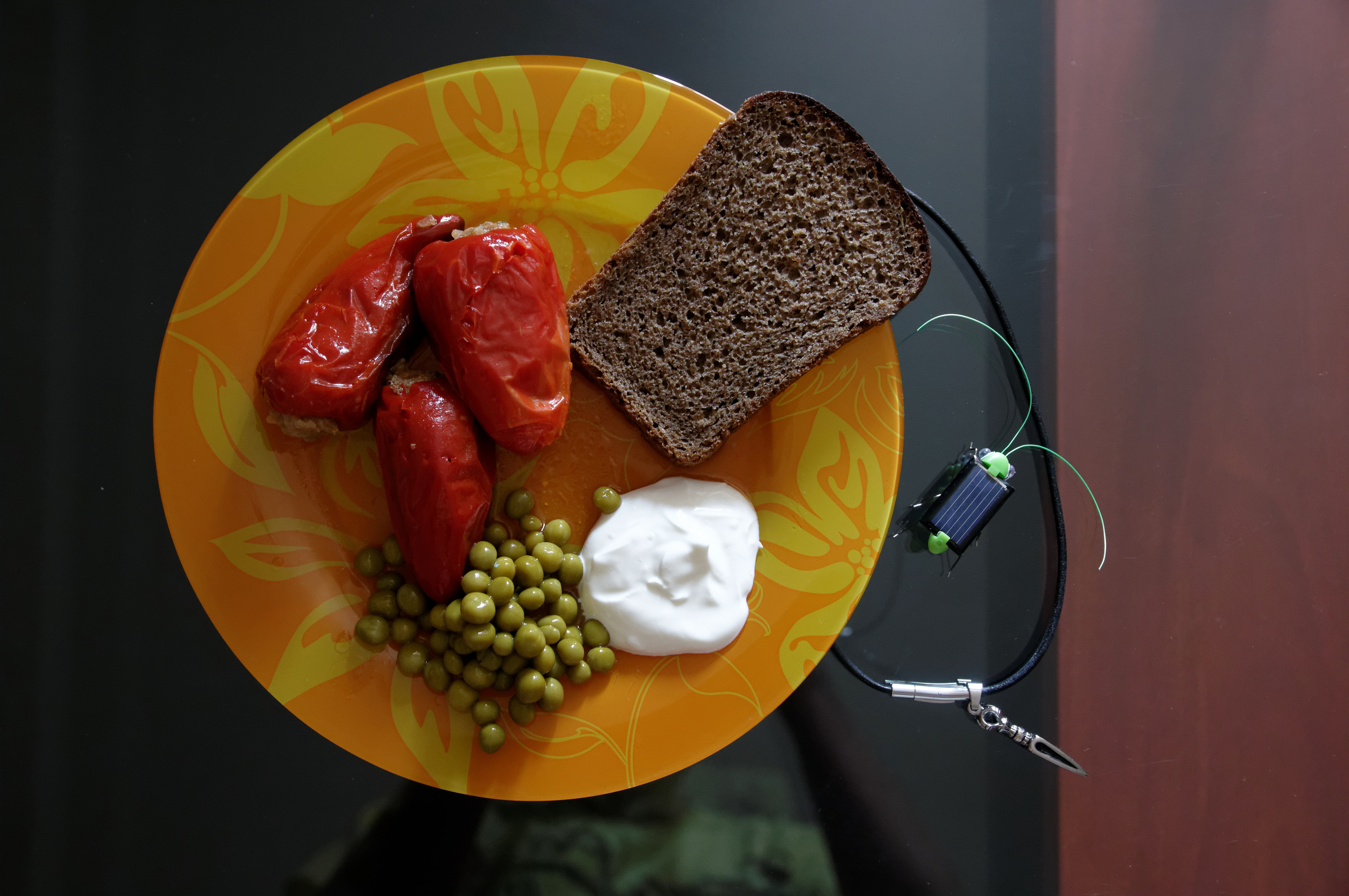
Ukrainian stuffed red peppers with dark rye bread

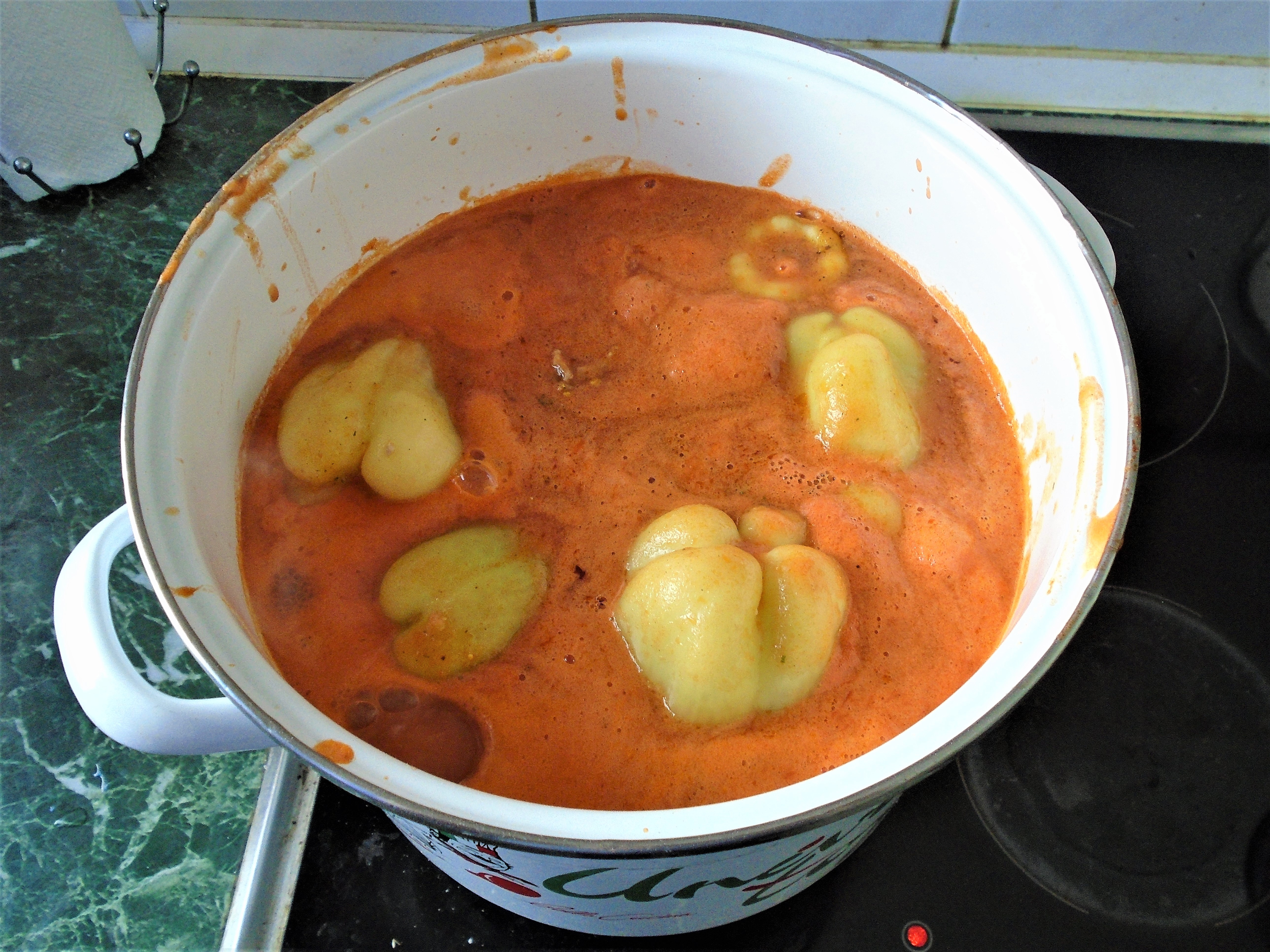
Croatian stuffed peppers in a cooking pot

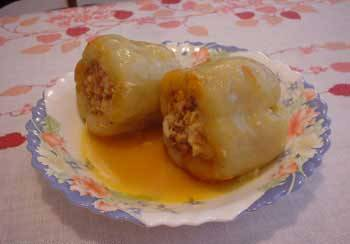
A portion of stuffed green peppers

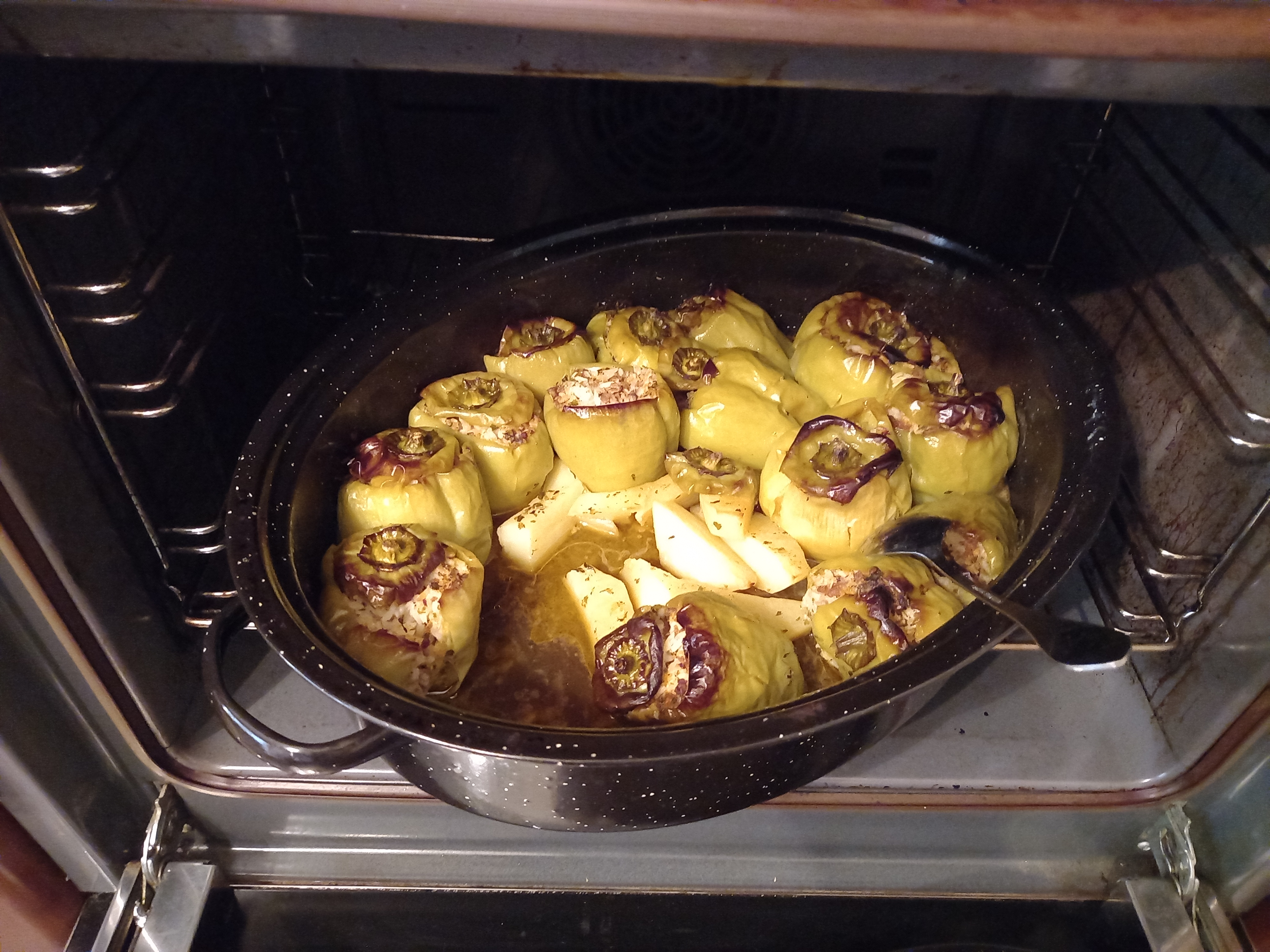
Stuffed peppers (Γεμιστά), a typical Greek plate

There are many names for stuffed peppers in the languages of Central and Southeast Europe:

- biber dolmasi (Turkish)
- Bibər dolması (Azeri)
- Filana paprika or Punjena paprika (Croatian)
- Speca të mbushur (Albanian)
- Γεμιστά (Gemista) (Greek)
- Punjena paprika (Bosnian)
- Пълнени чушки (Pulneni chushki) (Български)
- Пуњена паприка (Serbian)
- Filana paprika or Polnjena paprika (Slovenian)
- Töltött paprika (Hungarian)
- Полнети пиперки (Polneti piperki) (Macedonian)
- Plněná paprika (Czech)
- Plnená paprika (Slovak)
- Фаршированный перец (Russian)
- Фарширований перець (Ukrainian)
- Ardei umpluți (Romanian)
- Faszerowana papryka (Polish)

The Hungarian variant, töltött paprika, is always made with Hungarian wax pepper, which has a distinctive taste somewhat similar to lecsó. Punjena paprika (pronounced [pûɲenaː pǎprika]) includes a tomato sauce. In Bulgaria, stuffed peppers are usually eaten with yogurt. Another variety of stuffed peppers in Bulgaria is made with mixed white cheese and eggs instead of meat and rice as stuffing.

In 2017, dolma making in Azerbaijan was included in the UNESCO Intangible Cultural Heritage Lists.

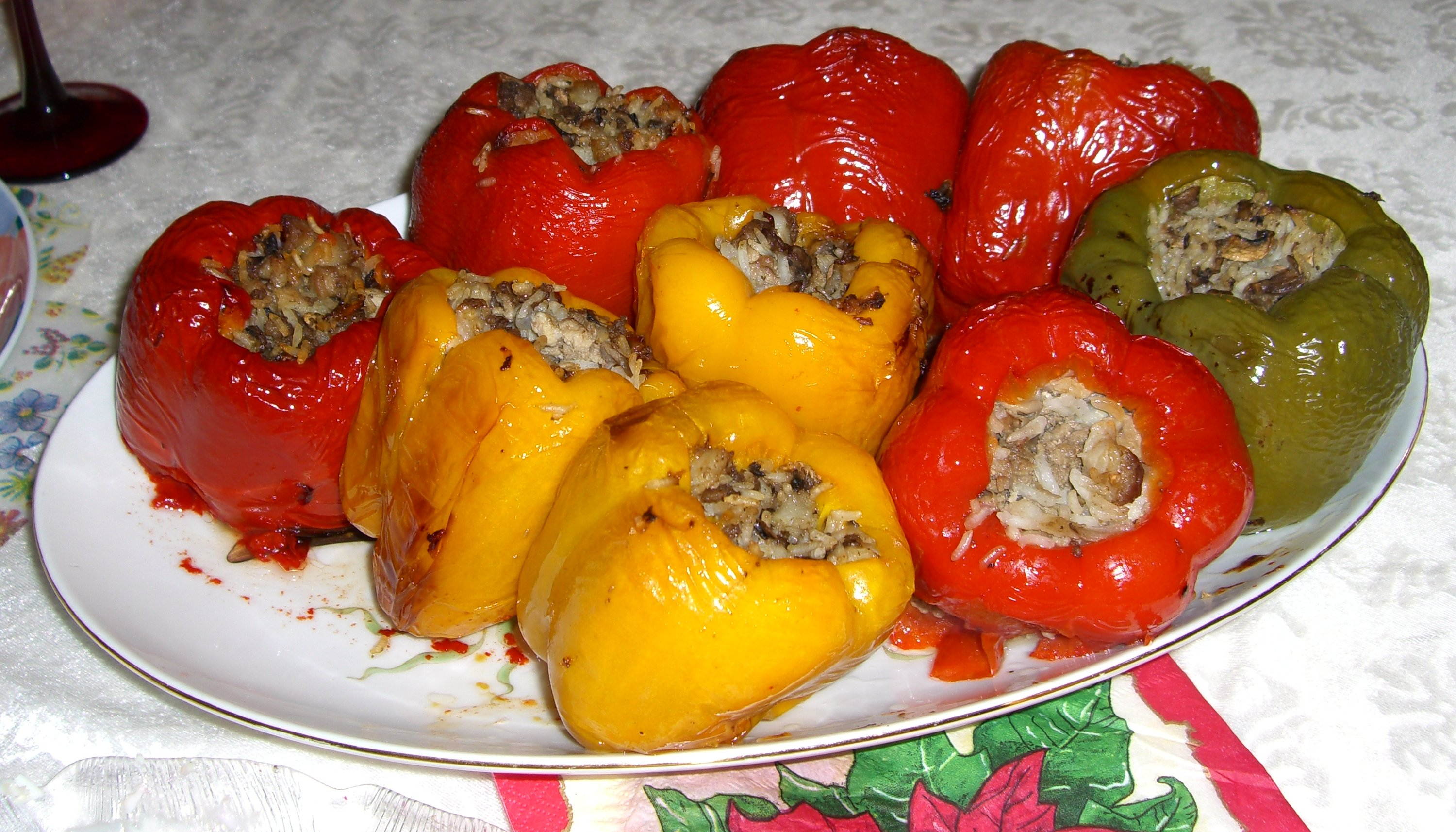
Romanian stuffed peppers called ardei umpluți

In Romanian cuisine, stuffed peppers are usually prepared with bell peppers stuffed with ground meat (usually pork), rice, onion, and other vegetables and spices and then boiled in a sauce made from cream, tomatoes, and spices.

Traditionally in Bulgaria, the filling is made of rice steamed in advance, onions, minced meat and spices, heat-treated and crammed into pre-cleaned, washed and riddled with needle peppers. After filling of peppers, they are put in a baking dish, water is added and the dish is baked in the oven. If raw egg is added to the cooled stuffing, filled peppers can be cooked in a pan, as the pods are boiled almost steamed.

Besides minced meat and rice, other fillings may be used, such as vegetables (for example leek) and rice, beans, or fresh cheese and eggs. The peppers themselves can be either fresh or dried. Dried red peppers are used especially in southeastern Serbia around Pirot and Dimitrovgrad, often in winter.

Stuffed peppers are often cooked by Romani people and is a popular dish in Romani cuisine.

== See also ==
- List of stuffed dishes
