= Imagawayaki =

Japanese and Taiwanese dessert

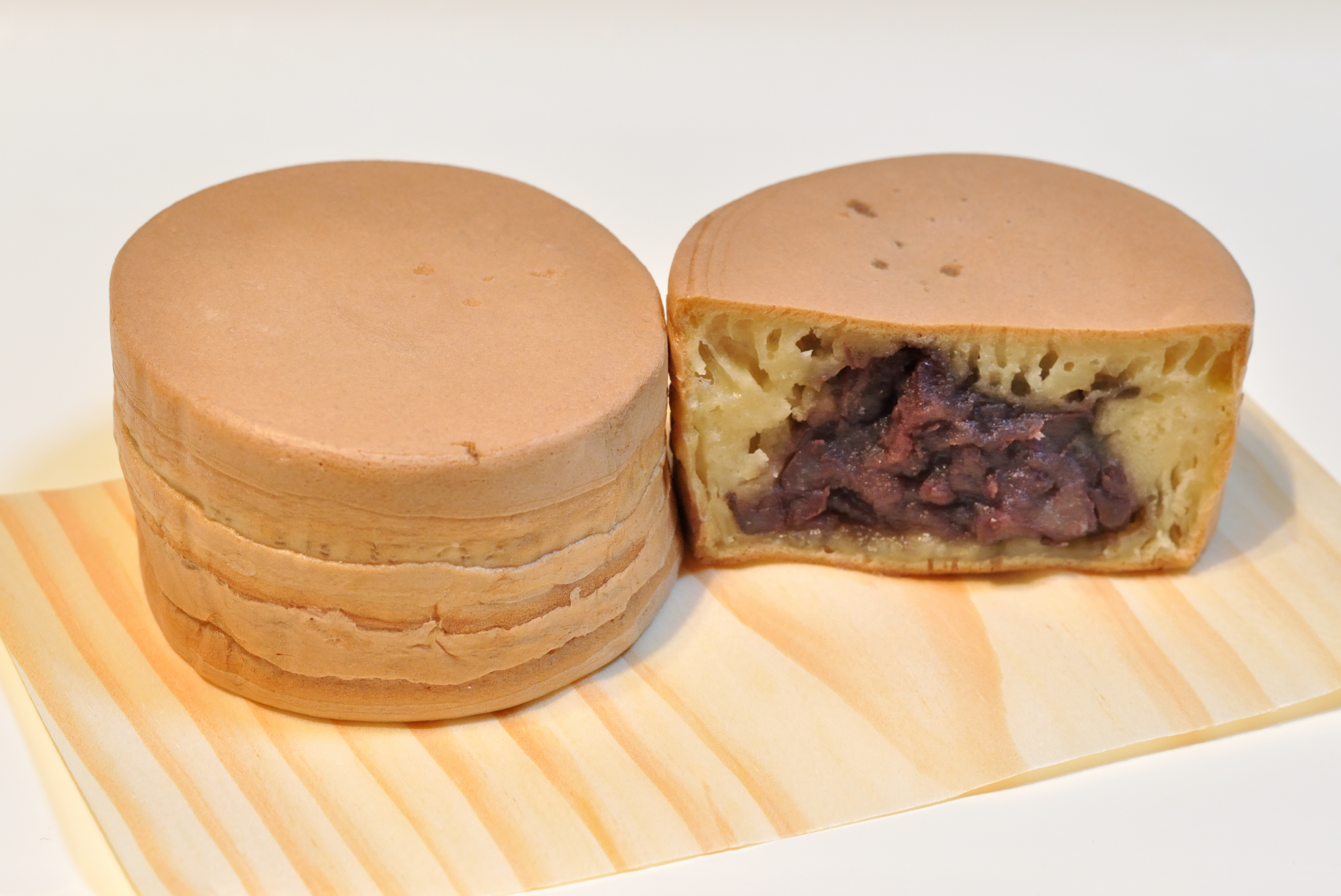
- Course: Snack
- Place of origin: Japan
- Region or state: Japan, Taiwan, South Korea, Malaysia, Philippines
- Serving temperature: Hot
- Main ingredients: Batter, sweet azuki bean paste

Imagawayaki being made in Tokyo, 2021

Imagawayaki (今川焼き) is a wagashi (Japanese dessert) often found at Japanese festivals as well as outside Japan, in countries such as Taiwan and South Korea. It is made of batter in a special pan (similar to a waffle iron but without the honeycomb pattern and instead resembles an "oban" which was the old Japanese coin used during the second half of the 16th century until the 19th century), and filled with sweet azuki bean paste, although it is becoming increasingly popular to use a wider variety of fillings such as vanilla custard, different fruit custards and preserves, curry, different meat and vegetable fillings, potato and mayonnaise. Imagawayaki are similar to dorayaki, but the latter are two separate pancakes sandwiched around the filling after cooking, and are often served cold.

Imagawayaki were first sold near the Imagawa Bridge in Kanda during the An'ei era (1772–1781) of the Edo period (1603–1867). The name imagawayaki originates from this time.

== Various names ==
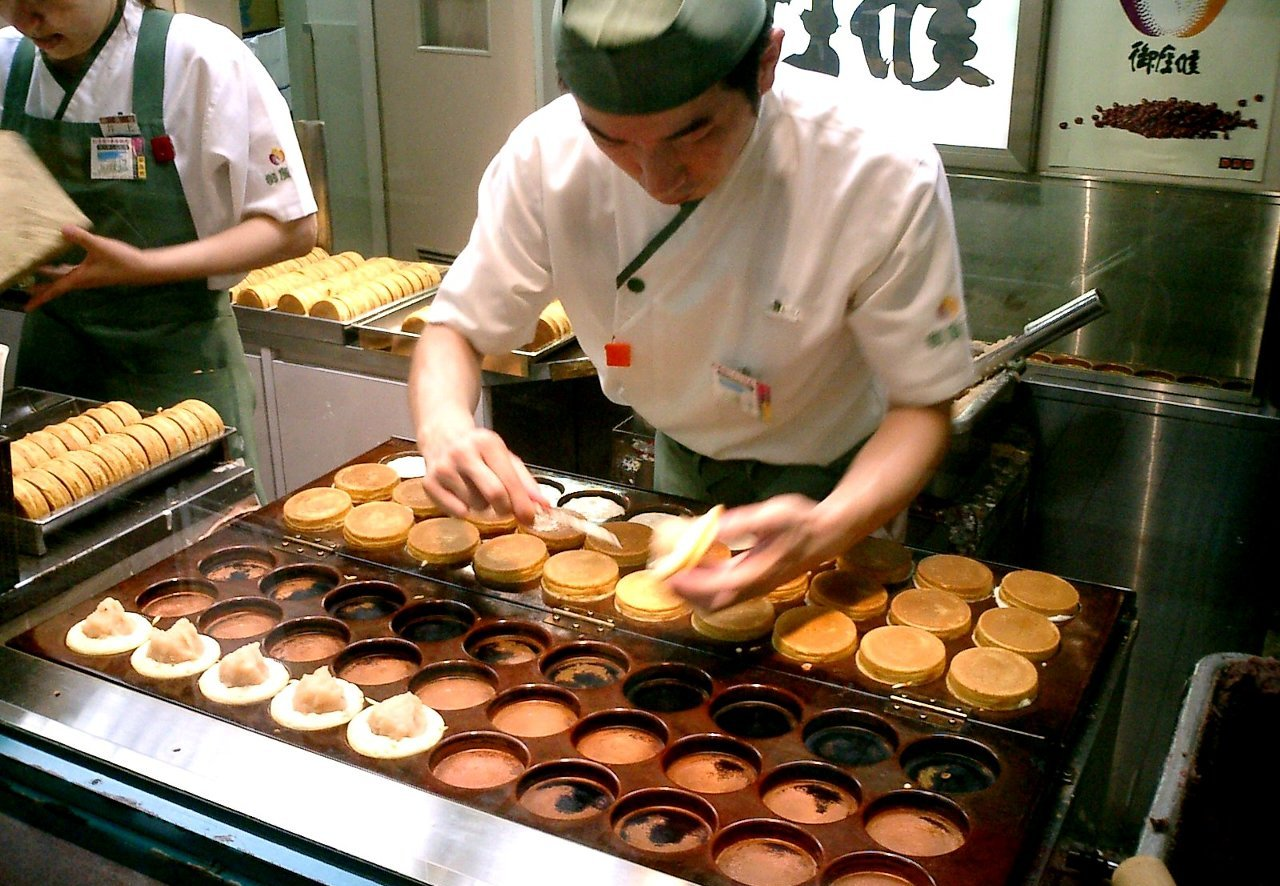
Imagawayaki (gozasōrō) being prepared in a store in Sannomiya, Kobe, Japan

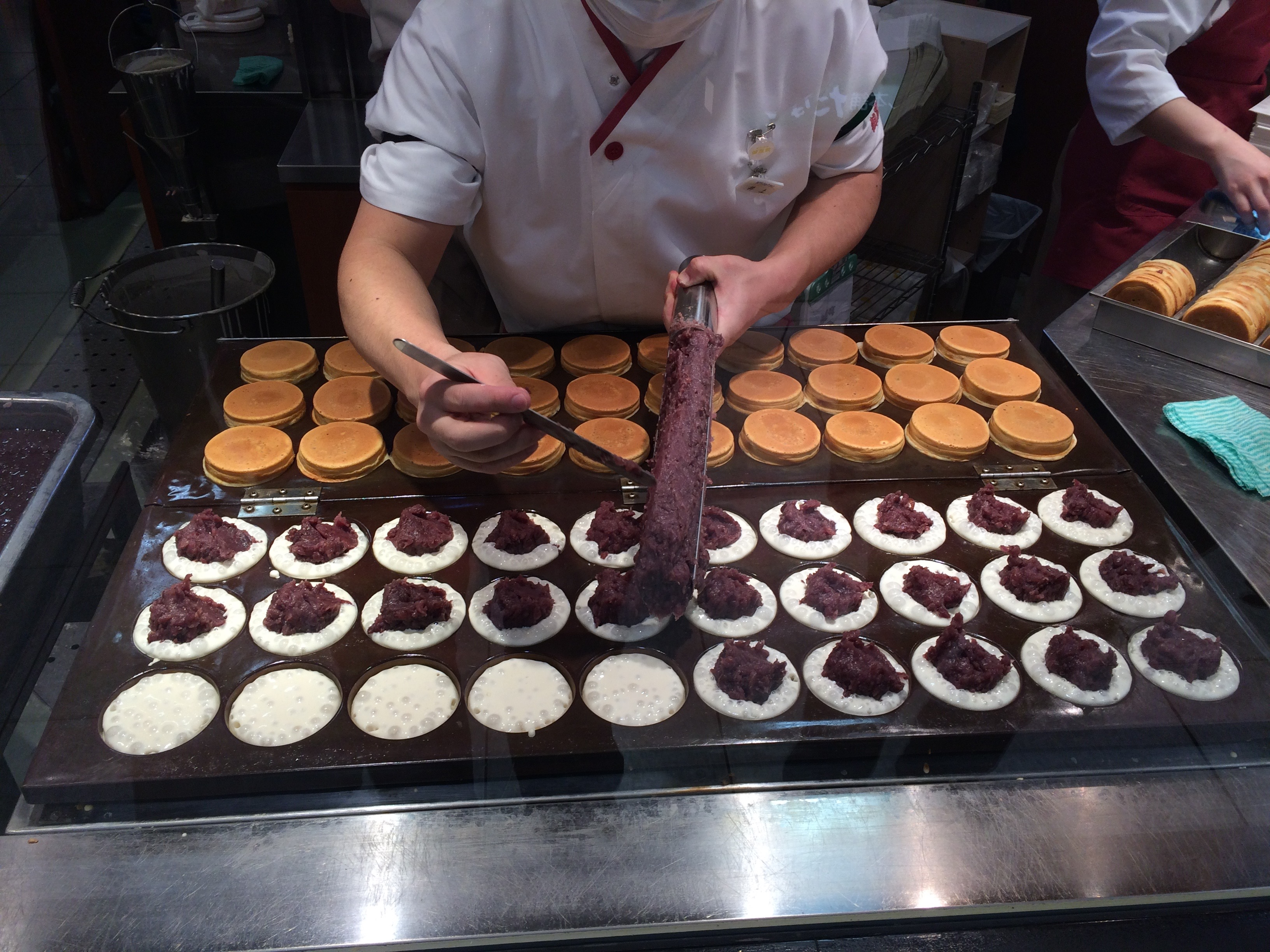
Ōban-yaki being made

Imagawayaki have been known by various names throughout different eras. Names also vary regionally, and some varieties sold only in certain stores have their own names.

- Ōban-yaki (大判焼き) – It was named in 1960 by a confectionery equipment manufacturer in Matsuyama, and currently the most widespread name outside of Kantō region.
- Kaiten-yaki (回転焼き) or Kaiten manjū (回転饅頭) – Kansai and Kyūshū region. kaiten (回転) means "rotation," i.e., derived from the process to bake it.
- Koban-yaki (小判焼き)
- Taiko-yaki (太鼓焼き) or Taiko manjū (太鼓饅頭) – western Japan especially Kansai and Kyūshū region
- Gishi-yaki (義士焼き) – Named after gishi (義士; loyal retainer), the forty-seven rōnin.
- Tomoe-yaki (巴焼き)
- Bunka-yaki (文化焼き)
- Taishō-yaki (大正焼き)
- Jiyū-yaki (自由焼き)
- Nijū-yaki (二重焼き) – Hiroshima Prefecture
- Fūfu manjū (夫婦饅頭) or Fū man (フーマン) – Okayama Prefecture
- Oyaki (おやき) – some of northern Tōhoku region and Hokkaidō, and different from the oyaki of Nagano Prefecture.

=== By store or company ===
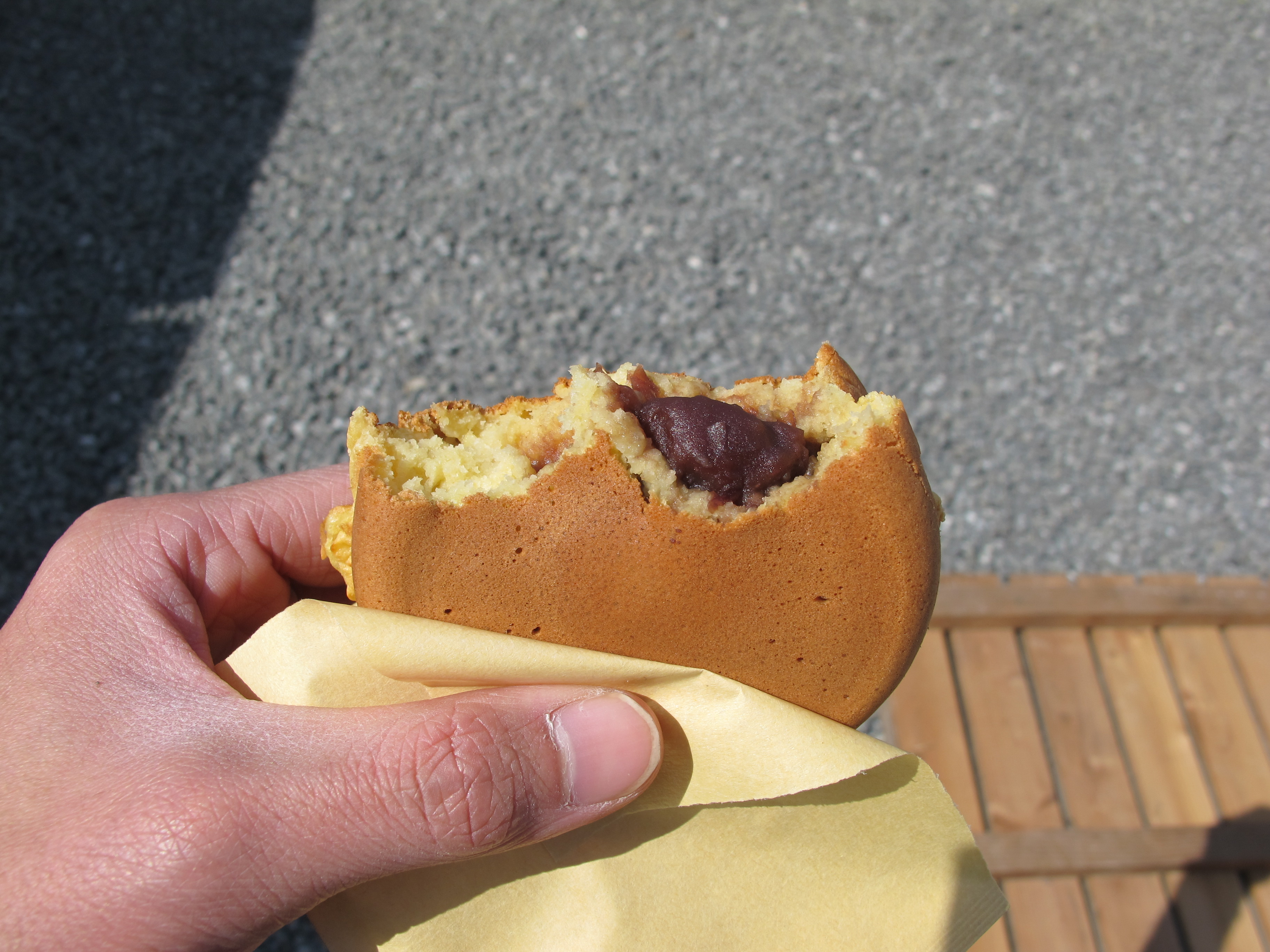

- Gozasōrō (御座候) – Produced by Gozasōrō Inc, established in 1950 in Himeji. It means "thank you for the purchase" in an archaic style.
- Higiri-yaki (ひぎりやき) – Produced by Sawai Honpo Inc in Ehime Prefecture. It originates in Higiri jizō near the Matsuyama Station.
- Jiman-yaki (自慢焼き) – Produced by the Fuji Ice shop in Nagano Prefecture.
- Ajiman (あじまん) – Produced by Ajiman Co., Ltd. in Yamagata Prefecture.
- Hōraku manjū (蜂楽饅頭) – Produced by Hōraku manjū Ltd. in Kumamoto Prefecture. It features the use of honey.

=== Historical and inactive ===
- Fukkō-yaki (復興焼き, "revival yaki") – in the song on the occasion of the revival after the Great Kantō earthquake in 1923, is mentioned that imagawayaki was renamed fukkōyaki.

=== Fictitious ===
- Baked Mochocho (ベイクドモチョチョ) – a coined name by an anonymous poster from the Japanese message board Futaba Channel in June 2021 that has since become an Internet meme.

== Taiwan ==
Imagawayaki were introduced to Taiwan during the period of Japanese rule in Taiwan and are now a traditional snack in Taiwan. They are commonly called wheelcakes or wheel pies (Chinese: 車輪餅; pinyin: chēlún bǐng). However, some of the older generation may directly use the Japanese term taiko manjū (太鼓饅頭).

== Korea ==
Imagawayaki are known as obang-tteok (오방떡) in Korea.

== Malaysia ==
Imagawayaki are known as tokiwado in Malaysia.

== Philippines ==
The Filipino counterpart, locally known as "Japanese cakes", are similar to imagawayaki but of a smaller serving size and are usually filled with cheese slices. This inexpensive snack is commonly found sold on special tricycle carts that have a built-in custom-made circular cooking mold. Other fillings are also available with sweet (strawberry, chocolate) and savory (ham and cheese) fillings.

== See also ==
- Egg waffle
- Ji dan gao (雞蛋糕) – egg sponge cake
- Taiyaki
- Wagashi
