= Maltose crackers =

Saltine crackers with maltose syrup

Maltose cracker
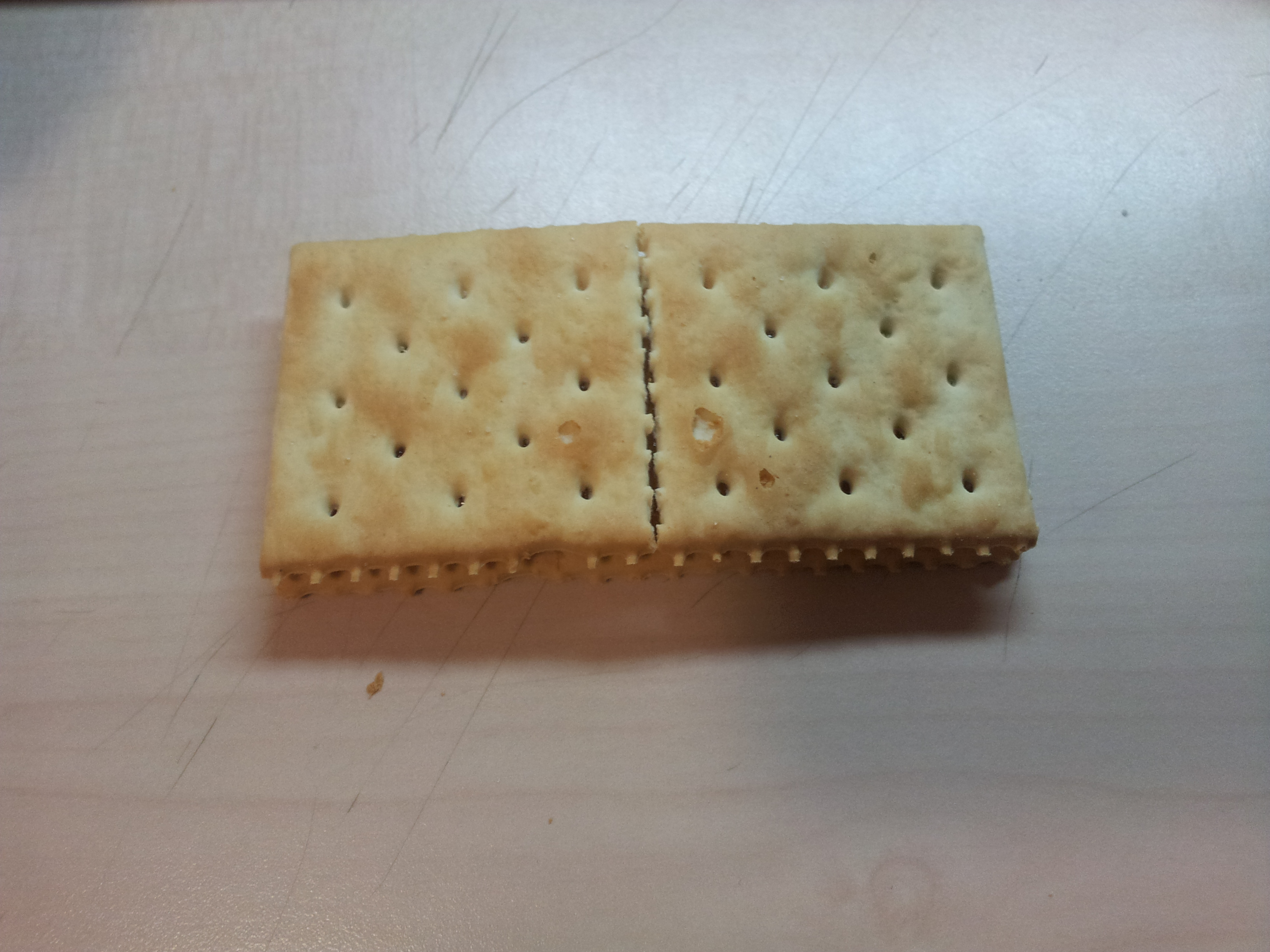
- Type: Cracker
- Region or state: Hong Kong

Maltose crackers are a popular traditional food in Hong Kong, consisting of maltose syrup sandwiched between two saltine crackers. The popularity of the maltose cracker peaked in the 1960s and 1970s as an item used in counter trading. Nowadays, maltose crackers are generally homemade due to a decline of sales.

== Popularity ==
Maltose crackers are a traditional Chinese snack. The calorific value of maltose is high and they possess a strong sweet flavor, making them a popular snack for children. Part of their popularity stems from their ease to make at home, and the lack of culinary skill needed to create them.

== Decline ==
Since the peak of maltose crackers, they have been on a steady decline, being sold and marketed less over time. This can be attributed to the creation of multiple other cracker variations, which overtook the maltose in popularity.
