= Egg waffle =

Hong Kong dish

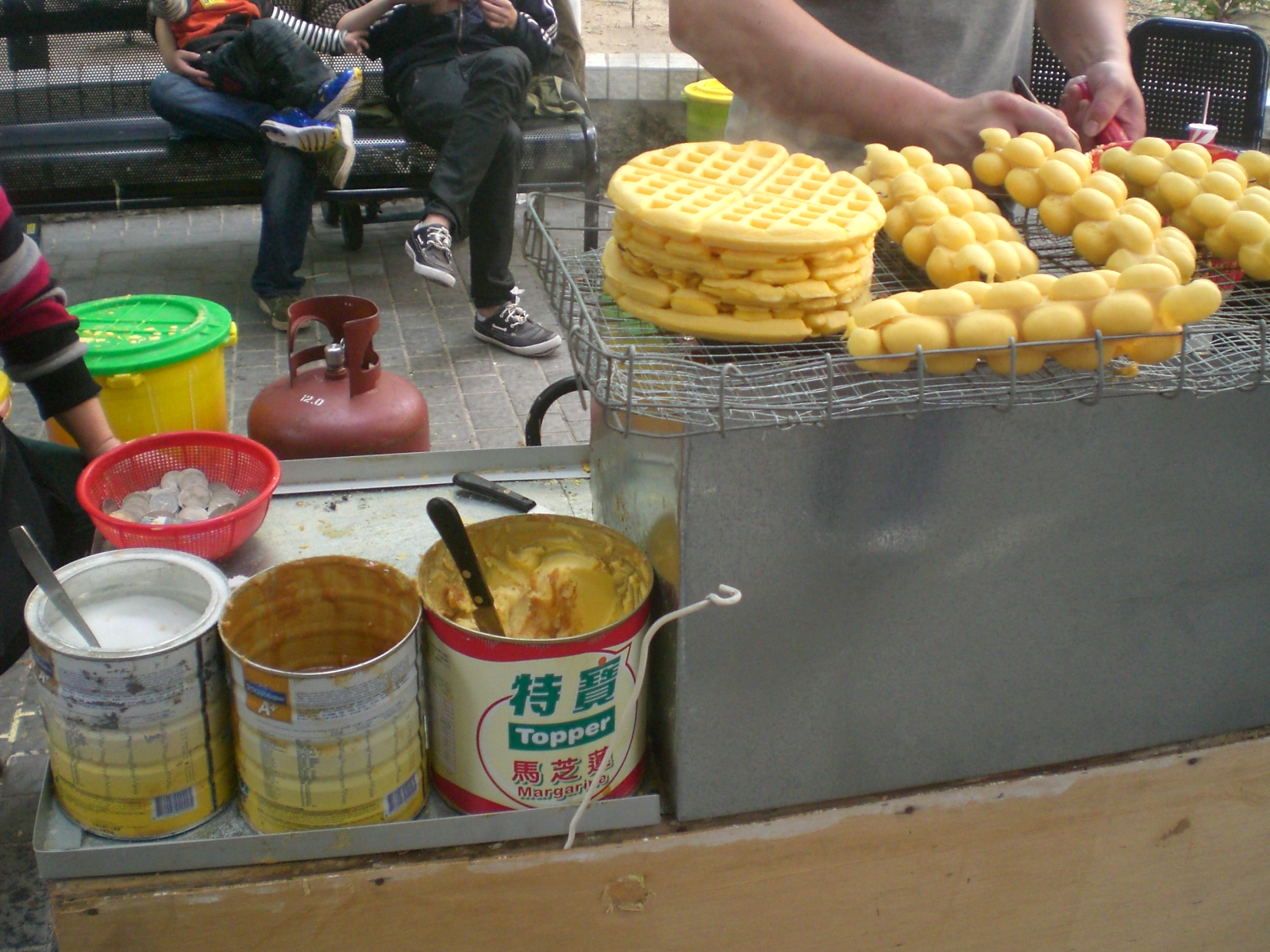
- Small ball-shaped egg waffle and large European-style waffles at a street food stand
- Alternative names: Bubble Waffle, Egg puff, puffle, gai daan jai, egglet
- Type: Pancake or waffle
- Place of origin: Hong Kong
- Serving temperature: Hot
- Main ingredients: Eggs, sugar, flour, evaporated milk

An egg waffle (雞蛋仔) is a spherical egg-based waffle popular in Hong Kong and Macau, consisting of an eggy leavened batter cooked between two plates of semi-spherical cells. They are usually served hot, and often eaten plain, although they may be served with fruit and flavors such as strawberry, coconut, or chocolate. It is referred to by its original Cantonese name, gai daan jai (雞蛋仔), and in English, an egg puff, bubble waffle, eggette, pancake balls, pancake waffle, egglet, and puffle. They are sometimes referred to as Hong Kong cakes in Chinatowns across America, especially in New York. One piece of egg waffle can have around 20 to 35 small round "balls".

Egg waffles are among the most popular Hong Kong "street snacks" and were ranked No. 1 in a 100 most popular HK street snack listing. They have been a favored street snack since their emergence in the 1950s, when they were made with coal fire heating and sold from street kiosks in Hong Kong.

== History ==
The origins of the egg waffle or gai daan jai (which literally translates to "little chicken egg") are unknown, despite being ingrained in the memories of Hong Kong residents young and old. One story says the enterprising post-war generation created the egg-shaped mold to make up for an eggless batter, as eggs used to be a luxury. Another tale points to street hawkers who bought damaged eggs on the cheap to work them into a batter, resulting in the classic golden color of the cake. It also is reasonable to suggest that the special iron skillet used to mold the gai daan jai is a Hong Kong take on the traditional checkered European waffle press.

There is also another tale that in 1944, a food stall owner named Mr. Cheung, began using a cart to sell daan kau jai (蛋球仔), which is the predecessor of egg waffle. Daan kau jai was bigger than an egg waffle, and was often divided into 30 pieces for selling by the hawkers.

== Preparation ==
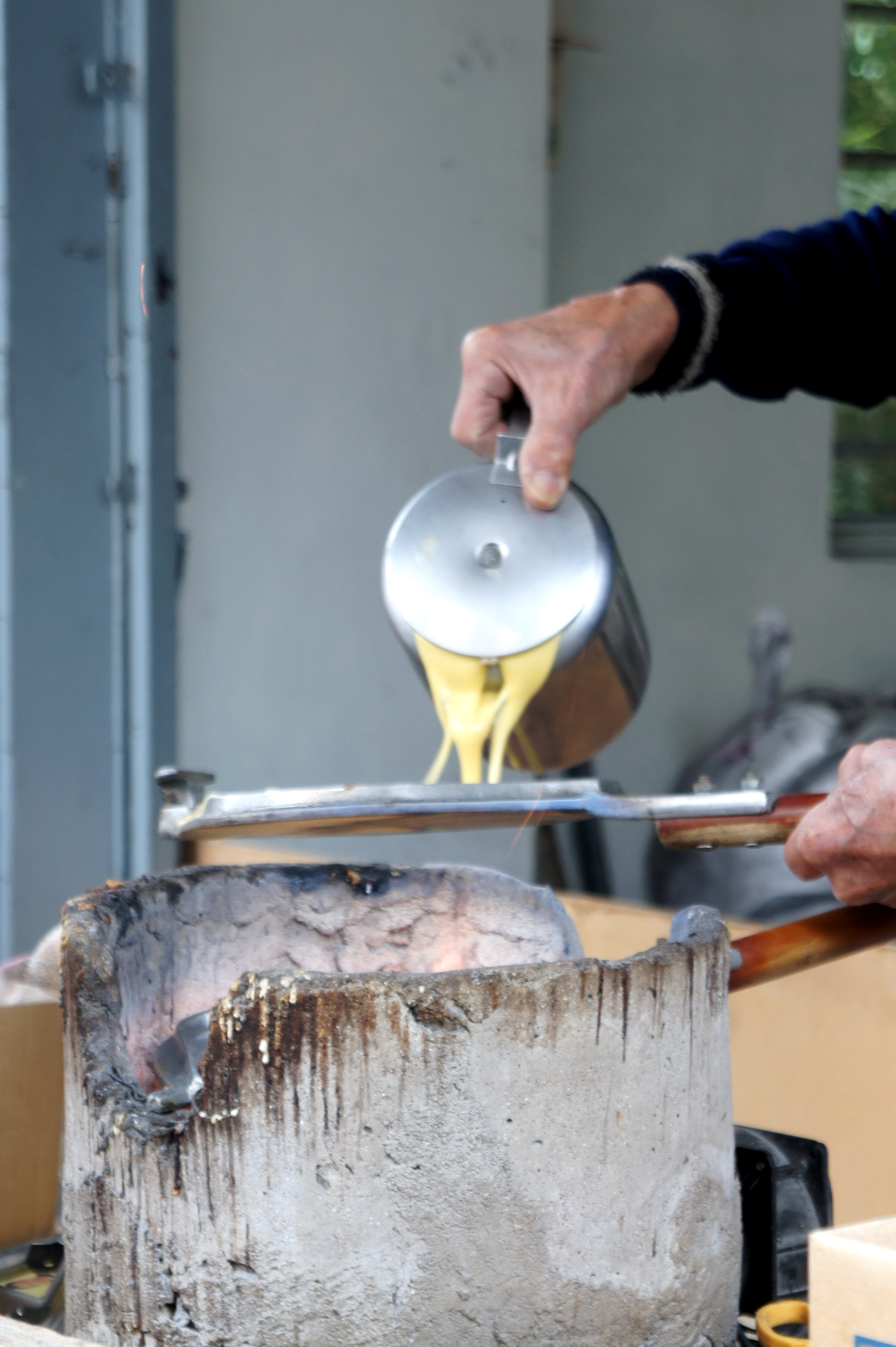
Egg batter is poured over a special waffle pan before being heated on a charcoal stove.

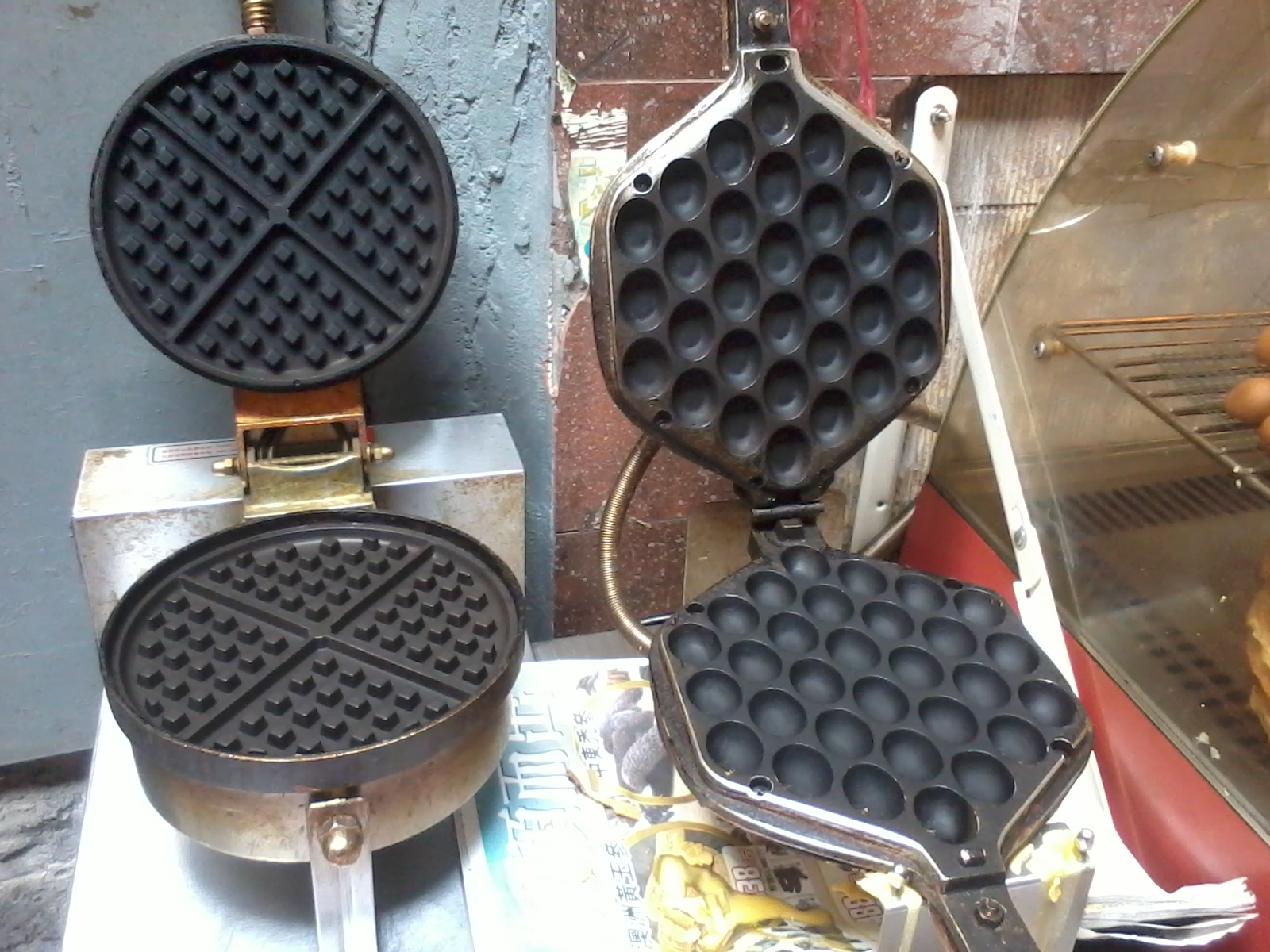
Modern egg waffle pans

Egg waffles are made from a sweet, egg-rich batter that is cooked on a hot griddle, a special frying pan with small round cells (resembling an æbleskiver pan, but with a higher number of smaller round cells). The griddle is set on hot coals in the fire, or more commonly, on an electrical heater. The batter is poured over the special frying pan and heated; the small ovals of egg waffles are thus formed. The crucial key to preparing a crispy egg waffle is to turn over the pan quickly after the batter is poured into the hot frying pan. This could create an egg waffle that is crispy on top, and cake-like on the bottom. The waffle is also crispy on the outside with each bubble providing a fluffiness on the inside. In addition to the conventional "egg taste", they are also available in a variety of flavours such as chocolate and green tea. Most batters used in egg waffle are quick breads, although some are also made using a yeast-raised or fermented batter.

== Modern flavours ==
Despite the origin of the traditional egg waffle is from Hong Kong, it is nowadays being reinvented all around the world. It is common to see the egg waffle in a variety of flavours such as green tea, chocolate, cheese, pandan, or purple sweet potato, but it has also gained popularity as a dessert in which it is served with different kinds of ice cream.

== See also ==
- Pandan waffle, a Vietnamese snack
- Æbleskiver, a similar Danish dish
- Kuzhi paniyaram, a similar dish from the south of India
- Paper wrapped cake, a Hong Kong egg sponge cake
- Poffertjes, a similar Dutch dish
- Taiyaki
- Takoyaki, a similar Japanese dish with savory octopus filling
- Imagawayaki
- List of quick breads
- Wheel Pie
