= Wheel pie =

Taiwanese pastry dessert

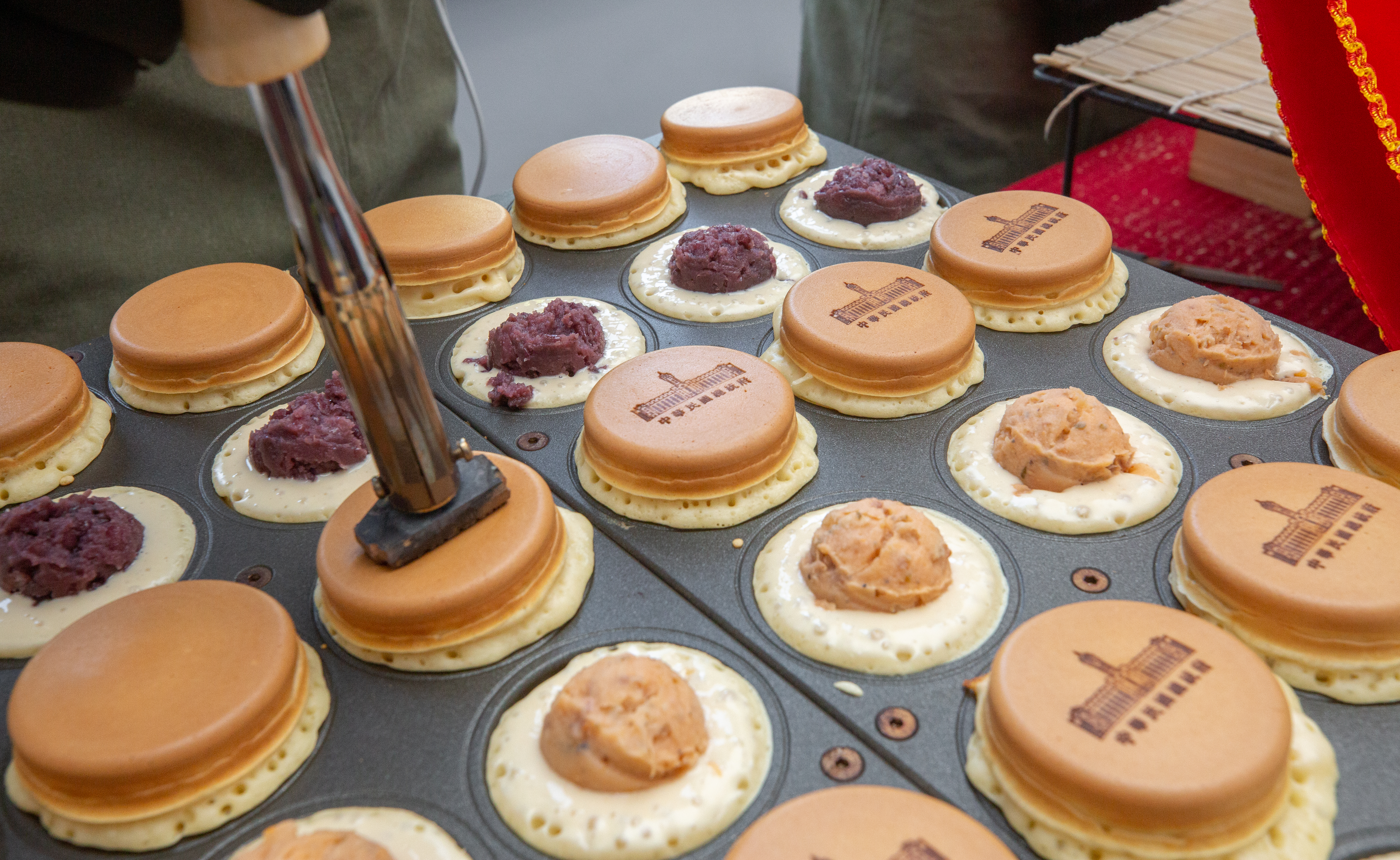
- Alternative names: Wheelcake
- Place of origin: Taiwan
- Serving temperature: Hot
- Main ingredients: Batter, sweet azuki bean paste
- Variations: Imagawayaki

Wheel pie, also known as wheel cake (Chinese: 車輪餅; Tongyong Pinyin: chēlúen bǐng; Tâi-lô: tshia-lián piánn) and commonly known as "red bean cake" (Chinese: 紅豆餅; Tongyong Pinyin: hóngdòu bǐng; Tâi-lô: âng-tāu-piánn) by locals, is a Taiwanese dessert that consists of a round, pancake-like pastry with sweet or savory fillings. Named for its wheel-like shape, it is common in night markets, street stalls, and bakeries throughout Taiwan.

Wheel pies have gained popularity in other countries, including Singapore, United States, Vietnam, France, and United Kingdom.

== History ==
Wheel pies are thought to be derived from the Japanese dessert imagawayaki (今川焼き), which was introduced to Taiwan during the Japanese colonial era (1895–1945). While influenced by its Japanese counterpart, wheel pies have since evolved to include distinctly Taiwanese flavours and adaptations.

Distinct local characteristics of Taiwanese wheel pies are a smaller size and a wider variety of fillings, including both sweet and savory choices less common in Japan. Additionally, Taiwanese vendors frequently experiment with modern flavors, such as matcha, salted egg yolk custard, and mochi, making wheel pies a more versatile snack. The cooking methods and batter recipes may also differ slightly, resulting in wheel pies having a softer and fluffier mouthfeel compared to the denser imagawayaki.

== Preparation ==
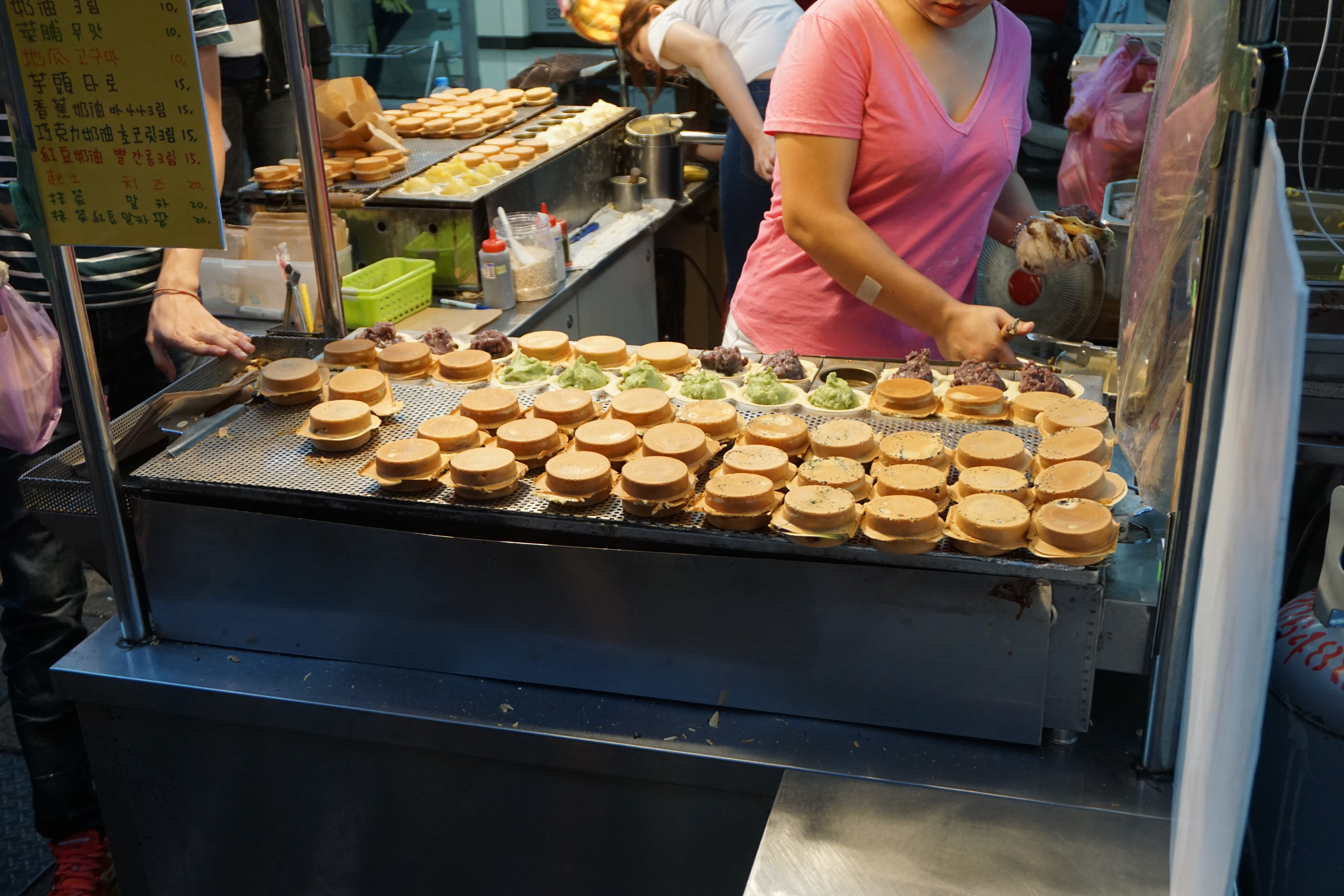
Wheel pies with various fillings being made

Wheel pies are made using a pancake batter poured into a circular mold on a specialized griddle. The batter is cooked until it forms a golden-brown shell. A generous amount of filling is placed in the center, then another layer of batter is poured on top before the two halves are sealed together. The result is a fluffy, round pastry with a rich filling.

=== Common fillings ===
Common fillings can be roughly divided into sweet fillings and savory fillings.

- Sweet:
  - Red bean paste (紅豆泥): A traditional filling made from sweetened adzuki beans.
  - Custard cream (卡士達醬): A filling with creamy, sweet custard that provides a smooth texture.
  - Chocolate (巧克力): A rich filling often favored by children.
  - Peanut butter (花生醬): A nutty, savory-sweet filling.
  - Taro paste (芋頭泥): A filling made from mashed taro, offering a mildly sweet and earthy flavor.
- Savory:
  - Dried radish (菜脯): A variation with dried preserved radish.
  - Shredded radish (蘿蔔絲): A variation with strips of radish.
  - Cheese and corn (起司玉米): A variation with melted cheese and corn kernels.
  - Ham and cheese (火腿起司): A fusion blending Western flavors.

Modern interpretations of wheel pies include innovative fillings such as matcha, mochi, salted egg yolk custard, and Earl Grey milk tea. Some vendors also create designs for specific holidays, incorporating unique shapes or decorations into the batter.

== See also ==
- Imagawayaki
- Taiwanese cuisine
- Dorayaki
