= Traditional candy and coconut wrap =

Cantonese snack food

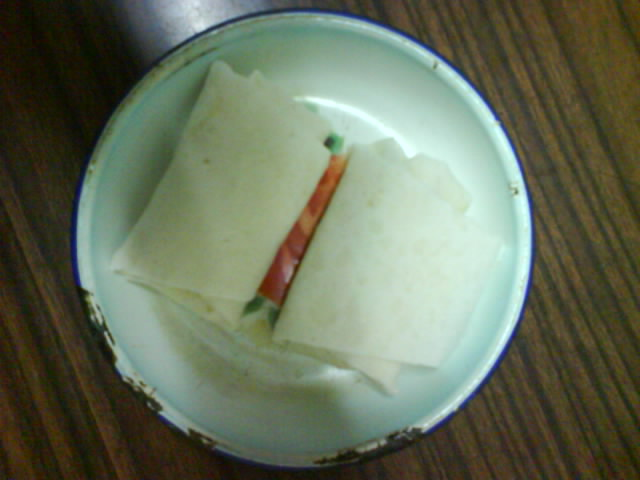
Traditional candy and coconut wrap

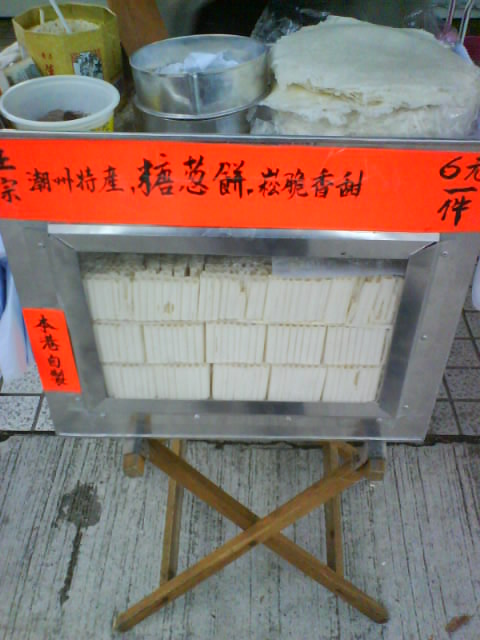
Traditional candy and coconut wrap, selling on the street in Hong Kong

Traditional candy and coconut wrap (Chinese: 糖蔥餅; Jyutping: tong4 cung1 beng2, Mandarin táng cōng bǐng, literally "sugar onion cake") is a traditional Cantonese snack. It is usually found on the street, where hawkers keep the wraps in a transparent metal box to sell. It is a wrap with hard sugar (candy and coconut) inside white wafer slice. It was especially famous in Hong Kong during the 1940s and 50s. The most popular fillings included shredded coconut, maltose and sesame.

== History ==
There are several folktales about how traditional candy and coconut wrap first appeared in China.

=== Monarchy period ===
In the monarchy period, elder members of a family would offer pancakes flavored with sugar as sacrifices to Confucius when their children reached school age. Those pancakes were flavored with syrups shaped like scallion, thus they were named as candy and coconut wrap (tang cong bing). The elder generation gave those pancakes to their children to eat after offering them to Confucius for blessings. As the Chinese pronunciation of 'scallion' is the same as "clever" ('cong'), it symbolizes that their children would become cleverer after eating those pancakes. The candy and coconut wrap is still famous in China as an inexpensive snack.

=== Cold Food Festival ===
At some point between the Spring and Autumn period and the early Han, veneration of the 7th-century-BC Jin noble Jie Zhitui as an immortal developed into the Cold Food Festival, when fire was avoided for up to a month around midwinter. This later moved to the Qingming solar term and became modern China's Tomb Sweeping Festival. Thin wraps around molded syrups shaped like scallions became popular in Chaoshan and developed into the candy and coconut wrap.

=== Qing dynasty ===
Some said the coconut candy has emerged since Qing dynasty. It is believed that the traditional coconut candy came from the period of Japanese occupation of Taiwan. At that time, the Japanese government required all Taiwanese to ship the Taiwan sucrose to Japan. The local sucrose factory staff did not want to do so. Therefore, they turned all the sucrose into coconut candy to mislead the Japanese army. After that, the coconut candy was widely spread all around the world and some people wrapped it with wafer slide as a snack, which became the traditional candy and coconut wrap.
