= Three Fried Stuffed Treasures =

Hong Kong Street Food

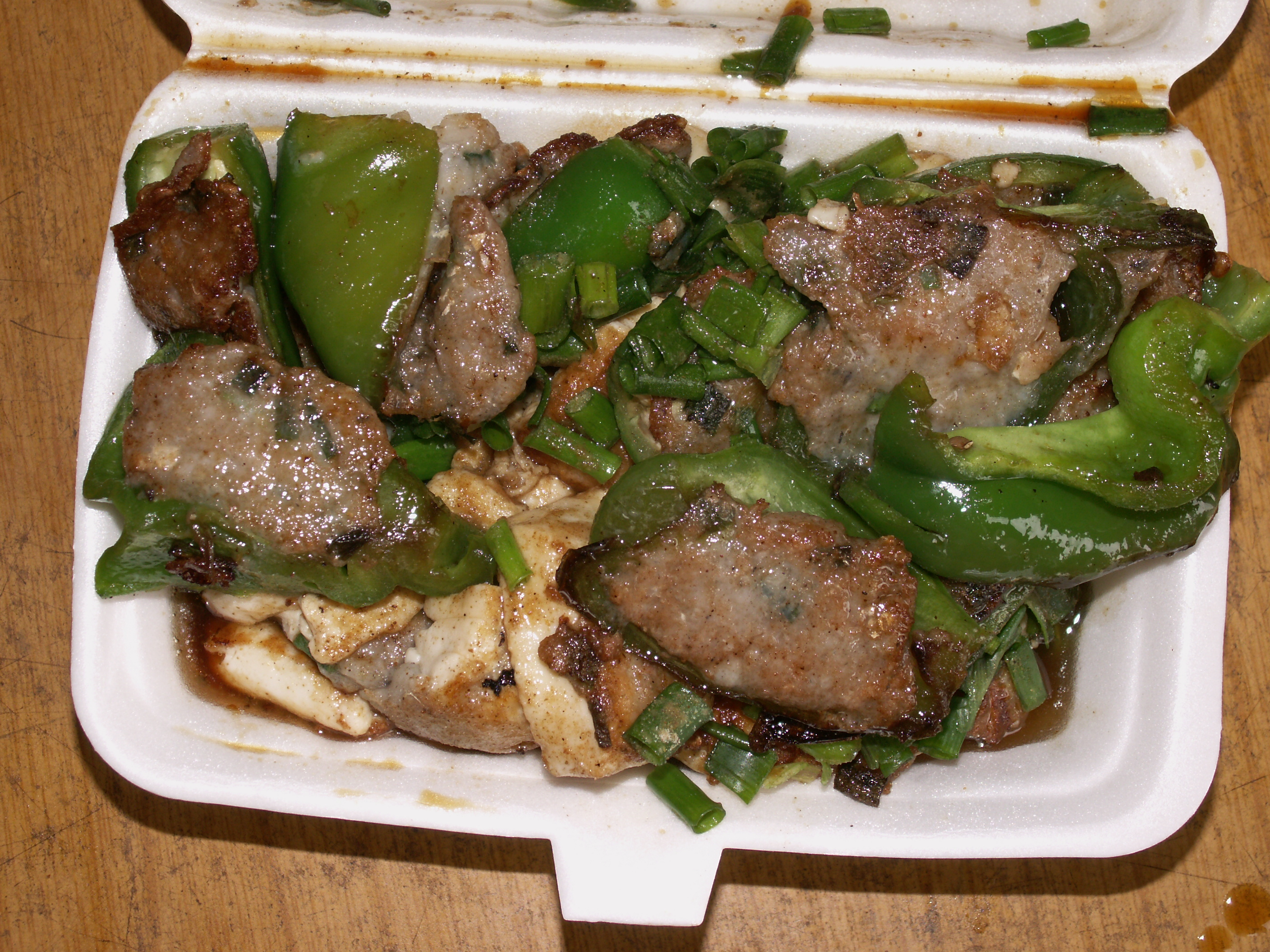
- Alternative names: Jin joeng saam bou (煎釀三寶)
- Place of origin: China (Hong Kong, Macau, Guangdong)
- Region or state: Pearl River Delta
- Main ingredients: Eggplant, green bell pepper, tofu,mud carp
- Variations: Red sausage, shiitake mushrooms, bitter melon, salted duck egg yolk

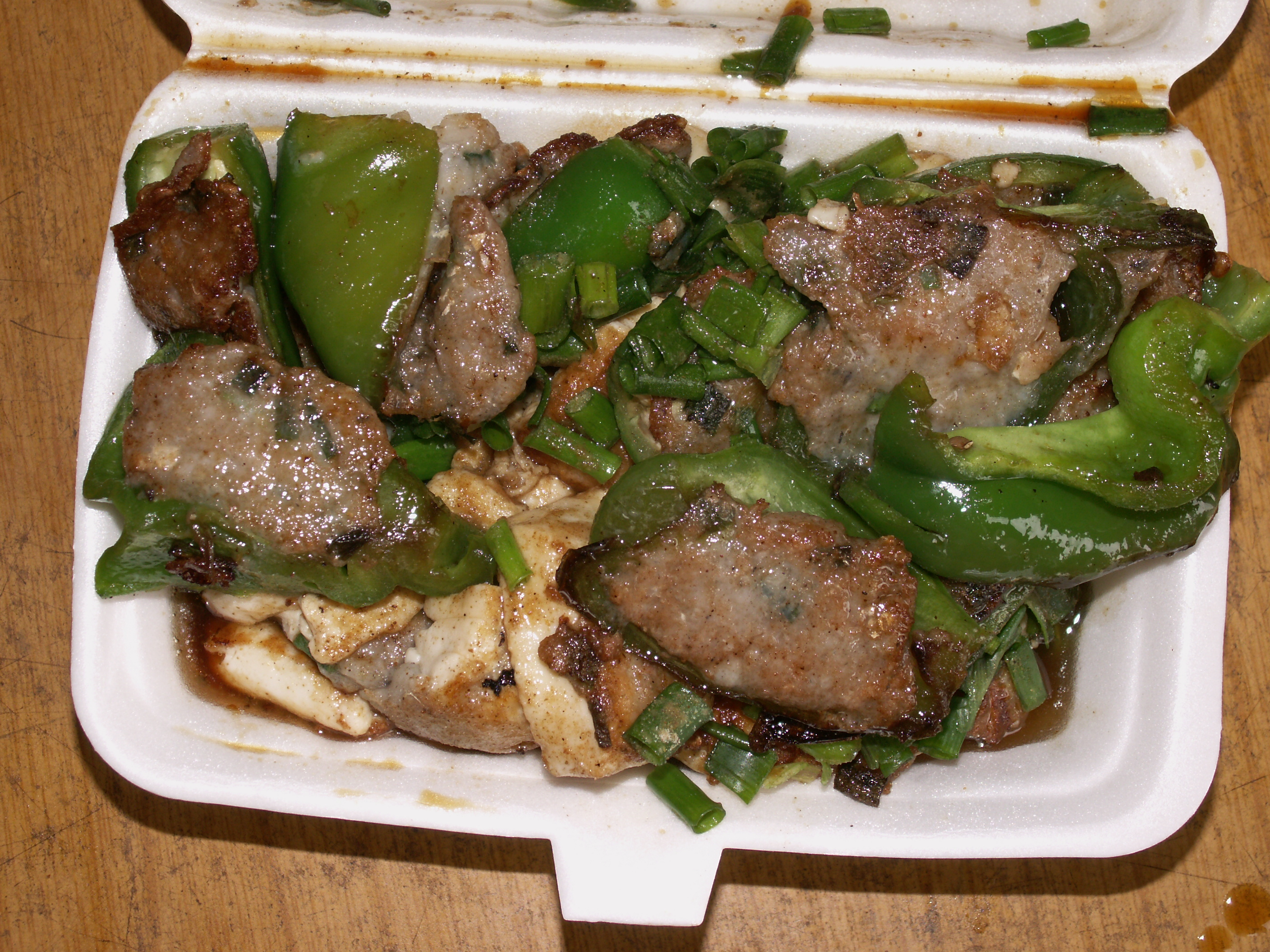
Three Fried Stuffed Treasures in a polystyrene foam box

Three Fried Stuffed Treasures (simplified Chinese: 煎酿三宝; traditional Chinese: 煎釀三寶; pinyin: jiānniàng sānbǎo; Jyutping: zin1 joeng6 saam1 bou2; Cantonese Yale: jīn yeuhng sāam bóu) is a traditional Cantonese cuisine originating in Guangdong province that has become a simple Street food in Hong Kong and Macau. The dish invlove three items,eggplant, green bell pepper, and tofu which stuffed with mashed mud carp paste (鯪魚肉) and pan-fried in shallow oil until golden brown.

In Hong Kong street food culture, the snack is commonly sold at roadside stalls and takeaway shops. Customers select three to five pieces of Three Fried Stuffed Treasure with bamboo skewers in paper bags and soy sauce.

== Origins and History ==
The culinary technique behind Three Fried Stuffed Treasures originates from a combination of Hakka cuisine and Shunde cuisine in the Pearl River Delta region. In traditional Hakka cooking, niang (釀; joeng6 in Cantonese) refers to the practice of stuffing minced meat or fish paste into tofu and seasonal vegetables. Meanwhile, a chefs in Shunde developed techniques for deboning and hand-whipping mud carp with salt and water to create a springy fish paste.

Following waves of migration from Guangdong to Hong Kong after the Second World War, stuffed vegetables transitioned from home-cooked family dishes to inexpensive street snacks sold by itinerant hawkers (走鬼檔) pushing wooden carts through working-class districts. Because fresh mud carp paste was affordable and rich in protein, hawkers began selling Three Fried Stuffed Treasures to manual laborers on the streets. From the 1970s onward, Urban Council tightened municipal hygiene regulations and later the Food and Environmental Hygiene Department gradually moved street hawkers into licensed ground-floor snack shops to sell Hong Kong street foods.

== Ingredients and variations ==
=== Traditional Components ===
The main ingredient of the filling is dace paste (鯪魚滑). To make the paste, chefs scrape the flesh from raw mud carp, mince it finely, and repeatedly slap it against a bowl. This process develops protein bonds to create springy texture paste. Finally, dried Mandarin orange peel (陳皮), chopped scallions, and white pepper are kneaded in to mask the fish's earthy flavor.

To ensure the fish paste stick to vegetable surfaces during frying, eggplant, seeded green bell pepper, or tofu puffs with a thin layer of cornstarch before adding the paste on top. During cooking, the stuffed pieces are pan-fried fish-side down on an iron griddle until golden brown, then flipped to cook the vegetable side.

=== Modern assortment and condiments ===
Despite the name "Three Treasures", modern street food stalls in Hong Kong, Macau, and Guangdong typically display metal trays containing more than three varieties of stuffed items. Example include:

- Slices of Cantonese red sausage (紅腸) topped with fish paste
- Shiitake mushrooms, bitter melon, and lotus root
- Deep-fried tofu skin rolls (響鈴) and fishballs

Since ingredient and labour costs increase significantly, many food stalls mix mud paste with cheaper marine fish surimi or pork fat. Traditional and Michelin Guide-listed stalls continue to advertise 100% hand-beaten dace paste. Upon serving, the fried pieces are brushed with sweetened soy sauce.

== See also ==
- Cantonese Cuisine
