= Hawkers in Hong Kong =

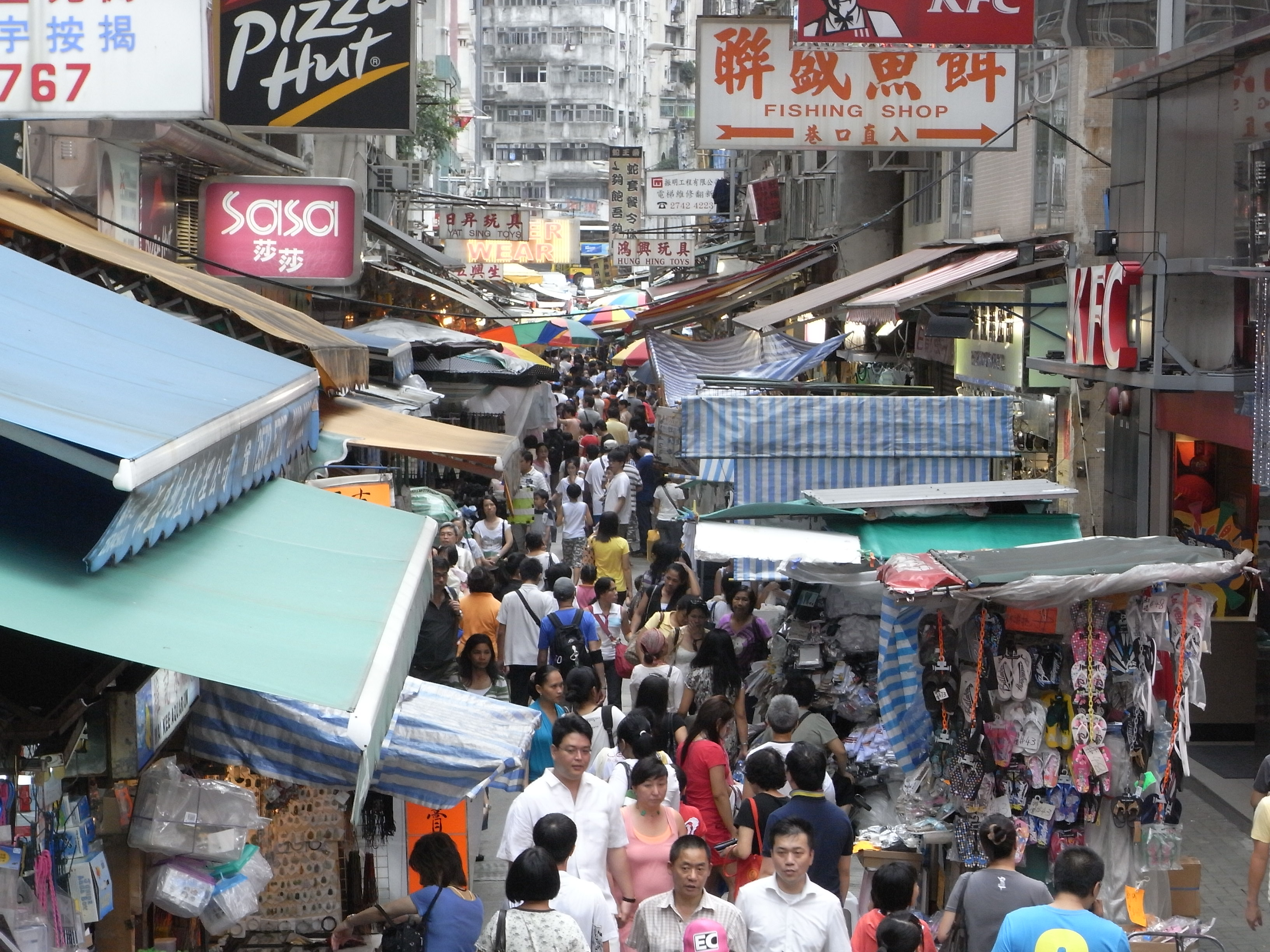
A street market in Wan Chai in 2010

Hawkers in Hong Kong (Chinese: 小販) are vendors of street food and inexpensive goods. They are found in urban areas and new towns alike, although certain districts such as Mong Kok, Sham Shui Po, and Kwun Tong are known for high concentrations of hawkers.

For many decades, hawking has served as a means for the lower class to make a living in Hong Kong, and allowed patrons to benefit from the convenience and low cost of hawker goods. However, the government has long considered the practice to be detrimental to public hygiene, and it has therefore been controlled by the Urban Council and its successor, the Food and Environmental Hygiene Department.

== Characteristics ==
Hawkers may be divided into the categories of fixed-pitch and itinerant (travelling). Both categories may sell a variety of goods, including food or dry goods. Street food hawkers commonly sell foods such as fishballs and fake shark fin soup (碗仔翅) relatively cheaply, from roadside vendor stalls.

The Hong Kong government has attempted to reduce the number of illegal vendors by designating hawker-permitted areas, but a large percentage of street vendors still operate illegally. According to Leung Yin Ling, author of the book 消失中的小販文化 (Disappearing Hawker Culture), hawkers exemplify the spirit of determination in the face of adversity that is an indelible part of Hong Kong culture. Local scholar Ma Kwok Ming has claimed that the economy of Hong Kong relies to a large extent on the street food industry, and that if hawkers are too harshly regulated, there will be little room for the development of Hong Kong food culture.

The Cantonese phrase jau gwei (Chinese: 走鬼; Jyutping: zau2 gwai2; lit. running [away from] ghosts) refers to the sudden abandonment of these stalls when Hawker Control Teams (Chinese: 小販管理隊, or 販管隊 in short) are imminent and the vendors are operating illegally or selling prohibited items, such as counterfeit branded goods. Gwei, meaning ghosts, refers to the Hawker Control Officers, who were traditionally Westerners. The phrase is shouted by vendors to warn others of the approaching squads, and can also be heard in Macao and Guangdong Province, where similar situations exist with illegal street vendors.

== History ==
=== 1940–1960s: Migrant influx from rural China ===
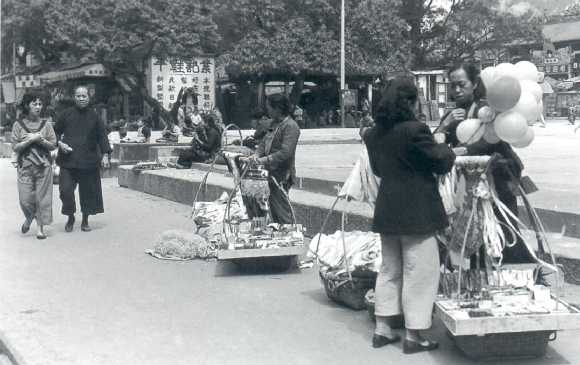
Hawkers on Temple Street in 1950

Between the 1940s and 60s, there was an influx of migrants from rural areas of mainland China into Hong Kong due to political instabilities in China (influenced by the Chinese Civil War and the Cultural Revolution) as well as famine. Many of these migrants were unskilled and uneducated, and became itinerant hawkers to earn a living with low operating costs, selling daily necessities such as food and clothing to those of the working classes. At that time, the economic condition in Hong Kong was low and working-class families were large, giving rise to 'family consumption'. These families bought their basic necessities from hawkers.

According to the Hong Kong Hawkers Association, there were an estimated 70,000 or more street hawkers in Hong Kong in 1949. At that time, while hawking provided employment opportunities, the large numbers of hawkers also led to noise pollution and congestion. In addition, the Urban Council felt that street hawking might be considered unfair competition by shopkeepers, since hawkers paid lower licence fees (HK$1,000-HK$3,000) than shop and stall tenants who also had to pay rents.

=== 1960–1970s: Increasing numbers ===
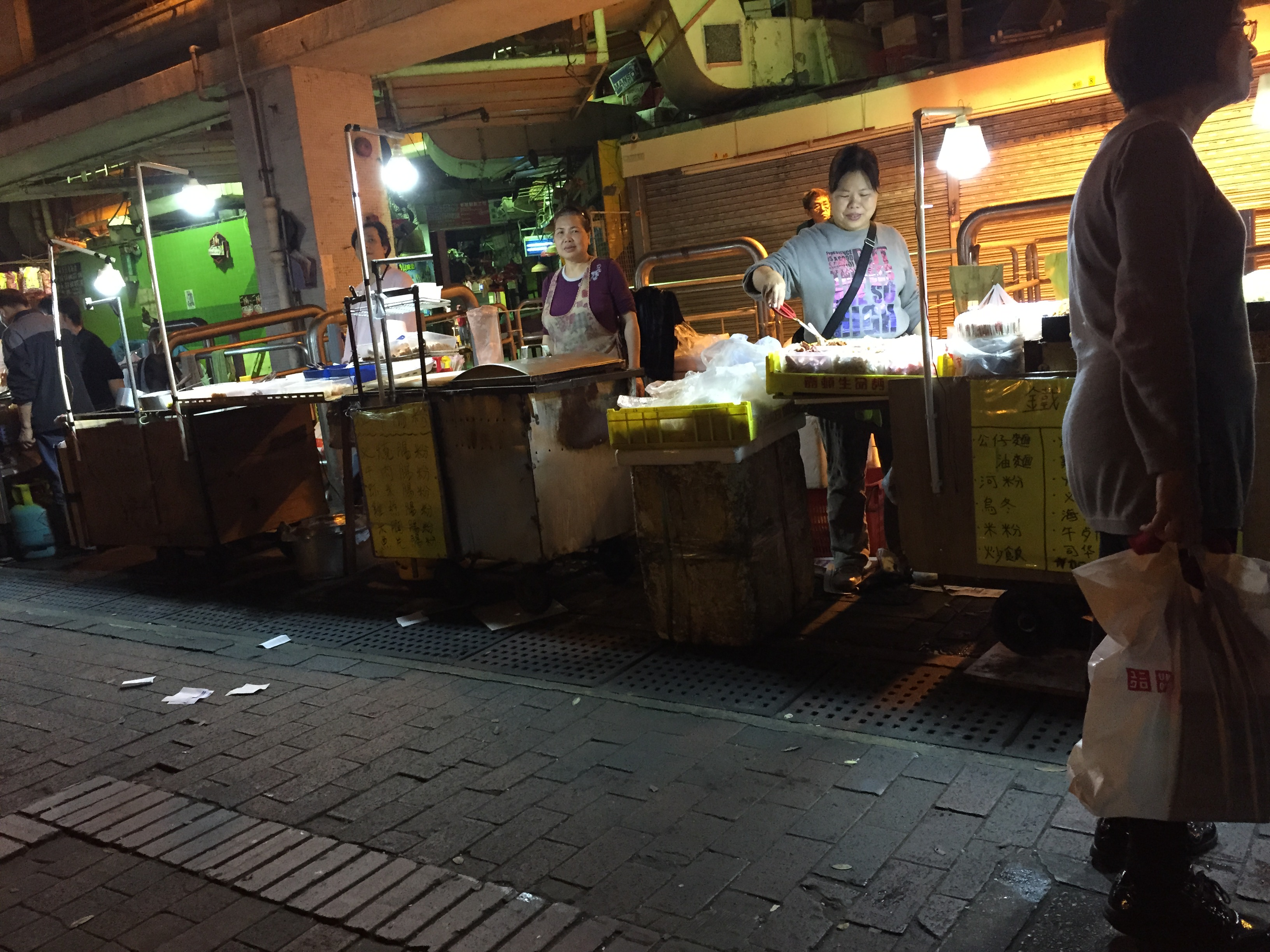
Hawkers in Tuen Mun in 2015

In the 1960s and 70s, at a time when there were few shopping malls and markets and little governmental regulation, the number of hawkers exceeded 300,000. Hawker numbers rose with the unemployment caused by the 1973-74 stock market crash and 1970s energy crisis, which led to factory closures and the decline of the manufacturing sector in Hong Kong.

=== 1970–2010: Regulation ===
However, as industrialisation and urbanisation increased, the British government became concerned about the health and hygiene issues posed by itinerant hawkers. In the 1970s, Itinerant Hawker Licences were issued and the succession and transfer of licenses was banned. The system granted licenses to 39,033 hawkers and prohibited 6,000 from the practice. Thereafter, the number of itinerant hawkers continued to decline.

In 2002, a five-year voluntary surrender scheme was implemented to encourage itinerant hawkers to surrender their licenses in exchange for "a one-off ex gratia payment, rental of a vacant stall in public markets under concessionary terms, or becoming a (non-cooked food) fixed pitch hawker.” The scheme drastically decreased the number of licensed hawkers, from 50,000 in 1974 to about 6,000 in 2007.

As of 30 November 2008, the total number of Fixed-Pitch Hawker Licenses (including dai pai dongs) and Itinerant Hawker Licenses were 6,594 and 552 respectively.

In 2009, the Hong Kong Food and Health Bureau (FHB) in conjunction with the Food and Environmental Hygiene Department (FEHD) reviewed the hawker licensing policy, with a view to potentially issuing new licenses to fixed-pitch hawkers.

=== 2010 – present: Lunar New Year incidents and protest against Link REIT ===
In recent years, the FEHD has taken action during Chinese New Year night markets, targeting unlicensed food hawkers on grounds of unsanitary practices, obstruction of roadways, noise pollution, and other nuisances. At the same time, members of the community have increasingly valued hawking as an element of Hong Kong's cultural heritage and collective memory, and as a valuable means of support for grassroots people.

During the 2014 Lunar New Year, unannounced inspections were conducted at Kweilin Street Night Market, with FEHD officers making arrests and confiscating a food cart. These actions led to public disquiet, with accusations of officers' opposition to ordinary citizens. Hawkers returned and the night market resumed as normal shortly after the officers' departure.

In November 2014, Sham Shui Po District Council, controlled by the pro-Beijing camp, passed a vote for zero-tolerance of unlicensed hawkers during the upcoming Lunar New Year, although other District Council members including Frederick Fung of the Association for Democracy and People's Livelihood (ADPL) obtained an exception for vendors selling dry goods. In reaction, grassroots organisations claimed that due to the government refusal to issue new hawker licences or construct new markets, vendors could only subsist in defiance of the law. It was further asserted that Kweilin Street Night Market was enjoying a resurgence in popularity and that a zero-tolerance hawker policy would only serve to exacerbate grievances. During the 2015 Lunar New Year, there were at least three groups in Sham Shui Po giving vocal support for street vendors, and Hong Kong locals embarked on a campaign of street cleaning of the night market in order to allay concerns over hygiene.

On 2 February 2016, in the approach to the Lunar New Year, a conflict occurred when hawkers were prevented from setting up stall at Leung King Estate, so as not to disrupt activity at the nearby shopping mall operated by Link REIT. On 7 February, Lunar New Year's Eve, multiple hawkers set up stall in Kweilin Street Night Market and were chased away or arrested, as was teacher and activist Siu Lai, who acted in defiance of the policy.

During the 2016 Lunar New Year, a violent bout of civil unrest dubbed the 'fishball revolution' (魚蛋革命) broke out in Mong Kok in response to the hardline approach taken by the FEHD to crack down on hawking in Hong Kong.

On 22 May 2016 unrest broke out at Yat Tung Estate in Tung Chung, where residents had held a bazaar in defiance of ongoing rent increases by Link REIT, which owns the shopping centre and market in Yat Tung and many other estates. Staff from the Housing Authority called the police and stated that the bazaar was causing "obstruction", a claim that was dismissed by some residents.

== See also ==
- Dai pai dong
- Dawn markets
- Hong Kong street food
- Kweilin Street Night Market
- Lunar New Year Fair
- Mister Softee (Hong Kong)
- Night markets in Hong Kong
- Rejuvenation of dai pai dong
- Shoe shiners in Hong Kong
- Mobile stalls in Hong Kong
- Tin Sau Bazaar
- Weekend markets in Hong Kong
