= Night markets in Hong Kong =

Night markets (Chinese: 夜市; Jyutping: je6 si5) in Hong Kong are bazaars usually located in older areas like Sham Shui Po, Mong Kok or Sheung Wan. Besides selling toys, clothes and food, some Hong Kong night markets also provide divination to visitors, such as the Temple Street Night Market, which is popular with foreign visitors.

== History ==
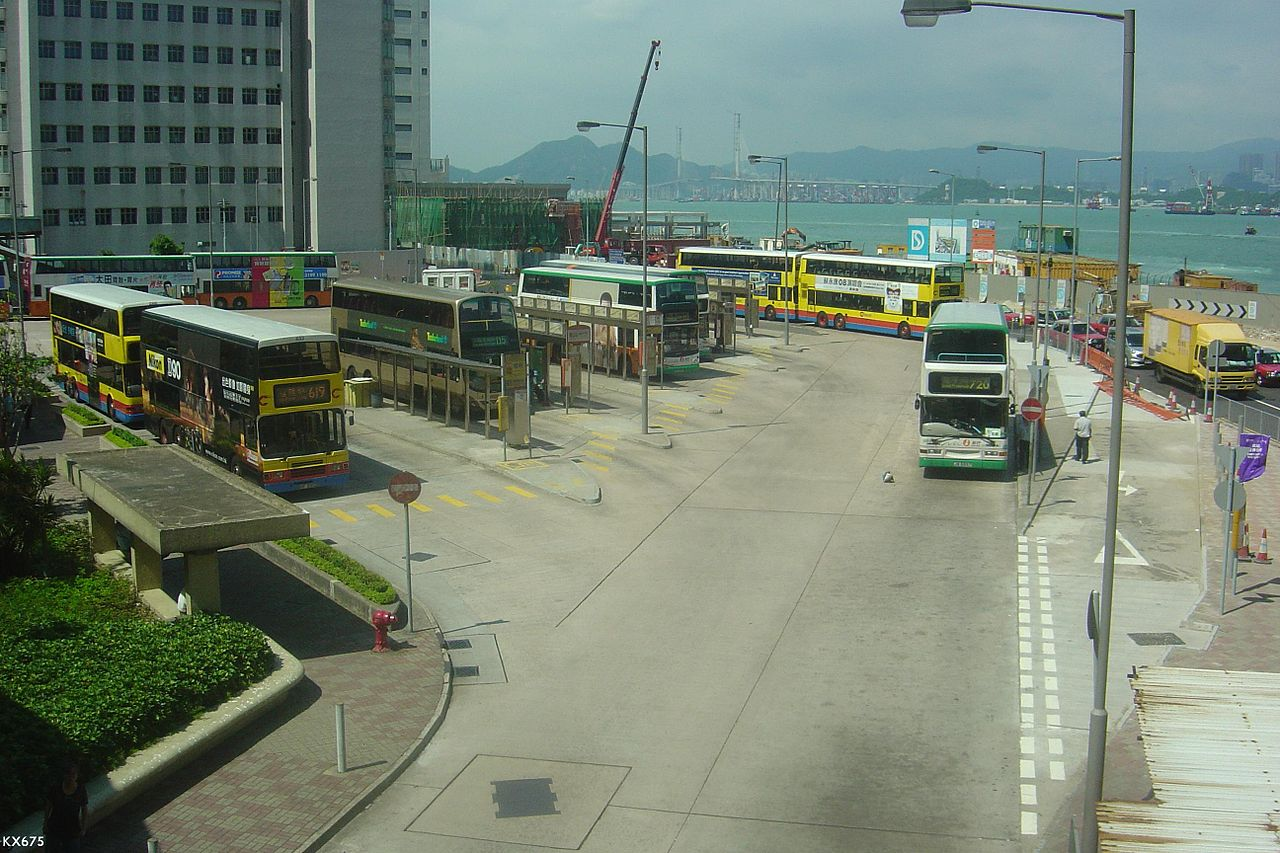
Central (Macau Ferry) Bus Terminus, which was originally Sheung Wan Gala Point.

Night markets in Hong Kong first began as night bazaars, or 大笪地, which, in Cantonese, refers to vast public open spaces where people gather. Like many other Asian countries, Hong Kong saw a growing trend of people gathering after work to socialise in open-air spaces. This trend gradually expanded to include other cultural and recreational activities and features, such as singing, juggling, fortune-telling, local food stalls and flea markets. At the height of night markets, they provided Hong Kong's less affluent citizenry with the best places for affordable everyday entertainment.

Sheung Wan Gala Point was the most popular night bazaar, emerging as the "poor man's nightclub" in the 1840s. Not only did it serve as a significant recreational spot among locals, it was also one of Hong Kong's most popular tourist attractions between the 1970s and 1980s. The site was permanently closed in 1992 because of redevelopments in the area including the Shun Tak Centre.

While night markets no longer serve as key recreational spots for locals, their distinctive cultural features have attracted many foreigners, and today they remain as popular tourist attractions for visitors to the city.

A key milestone in the history of night markets in Hong Kong was the launch of the PMQ Night Market in 2014. Contemporary art products, including handicrafts, and fusion food, were introduced, adding new elements to the traditional night market. Bands were invited to perform shows at this market aimed mainly at Hong Kong young people.

Despite the name, some night markets in Hong Kong open at noon in addition to their usual night hours. Most markets are closed on the first day of Chinese New Year.

== List of night markets ==
This is a list of night markets in Hong Kong sorted by their locations and opening frequency.

=== Regularly open ===
Hong Kong Island:

- Sheung Wan Gala Point

Kowloon:

- Ladies' Market (女人街)
- Temple Street Night Market
- Yau Ma Tei Jade Hawker Bazaar

=== Irregularly held ===
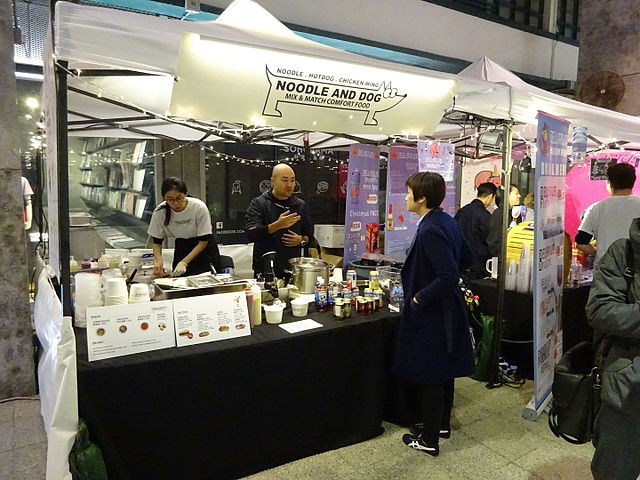
Night Market PMQ Central

Hong Kong Island:

- Night Market PMQ Central

New Territories:

- Tai Po Bamboo Theatre
- Sheung Shui Night Market
- Tsing Yi Bamboo Theatre
- Leung King Estate Night Market

Kowloon:

- Mong Kok Night Market
- Kweilin Street Night Market (桂林夜市)
- Sham Shui Po Night Market

== Famous attractions ==
These regularly open night markets are famous for selling traditional Hong Kong cuisine such as egg puffs, egg waffles, and fishballs.

Ladies' Market (女人街) - A great variety of products sold at the Ladies' Market are for women, such as accessories and clothing. Products for men are also sold including: phone accessories, backpacks and furnishings etc. A large part of the market's reputation originates from its bargaining culture in that customers can bargain with shop owners for a cheaper price. In addition, the market is famous for selling fake branded products which resemble those of renowned brands . The fact that bargaining is encouraged and expected, and because of the variety of merchandise offered for sale, this market is one of the most popular tourist landmarks.

Temple Street Night Market (廟街) - Temple Street Night Market possesses a number of diverse attractions. Like many night markets, this one is also has clusters of stalls selling clothes - mainly men's wear. This market is also known for having many fortune-tellers whose fortune-telling skills differ from one another. Some may look at the lines on the customer's face while others may read the palm of the customer's hand so as to predict their future. The performance and shows at night also contribute to the market's fame. Cantonese opera is occasionally performed which attract a lot of people, especially tourists wishing a taste of traditional Chinese culture.

Yau Ma Tei Jade Hawker Bazaar (油麻地玉石市場) - The main attraction of the Yau Ma Tei Jade Hawker Bazaar is indicated by its name. In this market, numerous stalls sell jade, and jade objects, of different quality, purity, colour and even thickness. Thousands and thousands of foreigners are fascinated by Jade, whose production is a high priority for Chinese officials. Pearls are another big attraction at this night market as they are cheaper than jade.

== Events ==
=== Mong Kok unrest ===
The authorities tried again in 2016 to crack down unlicensed stalls in Mong Kok Night Market near Langham Place having turned a blind eye to the situation in the past. Local activists are opposed to any moves that are seen as threats to local traditions. Dozens of people gathered to defend the vendors after watching a video of the night market on a local activist's Facebook page.

As officials tried to shut down a night food market in Mong Kok, hundreds of people confronted the police on Monday night. The standoff lasted all night, and finally finished at 8:00 a.m. the next morning. At least 54 people were arrested and dozens of people injured. Meanwhile, a police officer fired two gunshots in the air as a warning to violent defenders of the vendors.

=== Leung King Estate Night Market conflict ===
Food hawkers set up stalls outside the Leung King Plaza on the second day of Lunar New Year, 2 February. A group of security guards of unknown identity (due to the practice of outsourcing) confronted the hawkers, saying that opening stalls in the area around the Plaza is prohibited even though food hawkers have been selling traditional foods there for over 20 years.

The hawkers were forced to leave. Some confronted the security guards which led to serious conflict. One hawker's stall was pushed over by the guards, increasing the tension between both sides. Meanwhile, some security guards put up metal barricades to keep out the hawkers and block off the area. Residents were annoyed because the barricades blocked their ways home and were an inconvenience. The actions of the security guards also upset them. At one protest, until midnight over 200 people surrounded the area. There were violent conflicts and even journalists were injured.

== See also ==
- Bazaar
- Marketplace
- Merchant
- Night market
- Retail
