= Shun Tak Centre =

Building in Sheung Wan, Hong Kong

Coordinates: 22°17′17″N 114°09′07″E

信德中心 Shun Tak Centre

Shun Tak Centre
- Chinese: 信德中心
Transcriptions
Standard Mandarin
- Hanyu Pinyin: Xìn Dé Zhōngxīn
Yue: Cantonese
- Jyutping: seon3 dak1 zung1 sam1

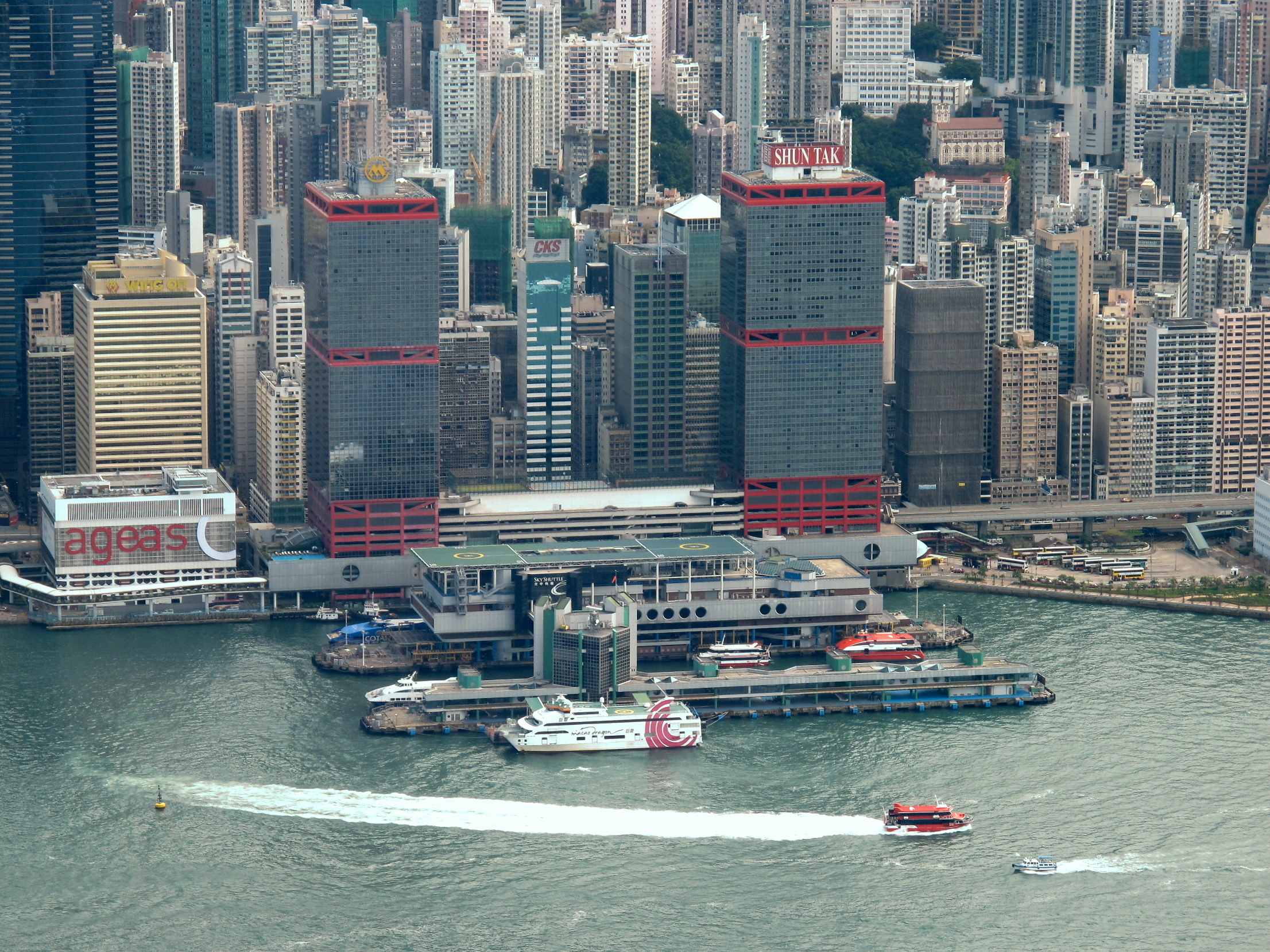
Shun Tak Centre (middle)

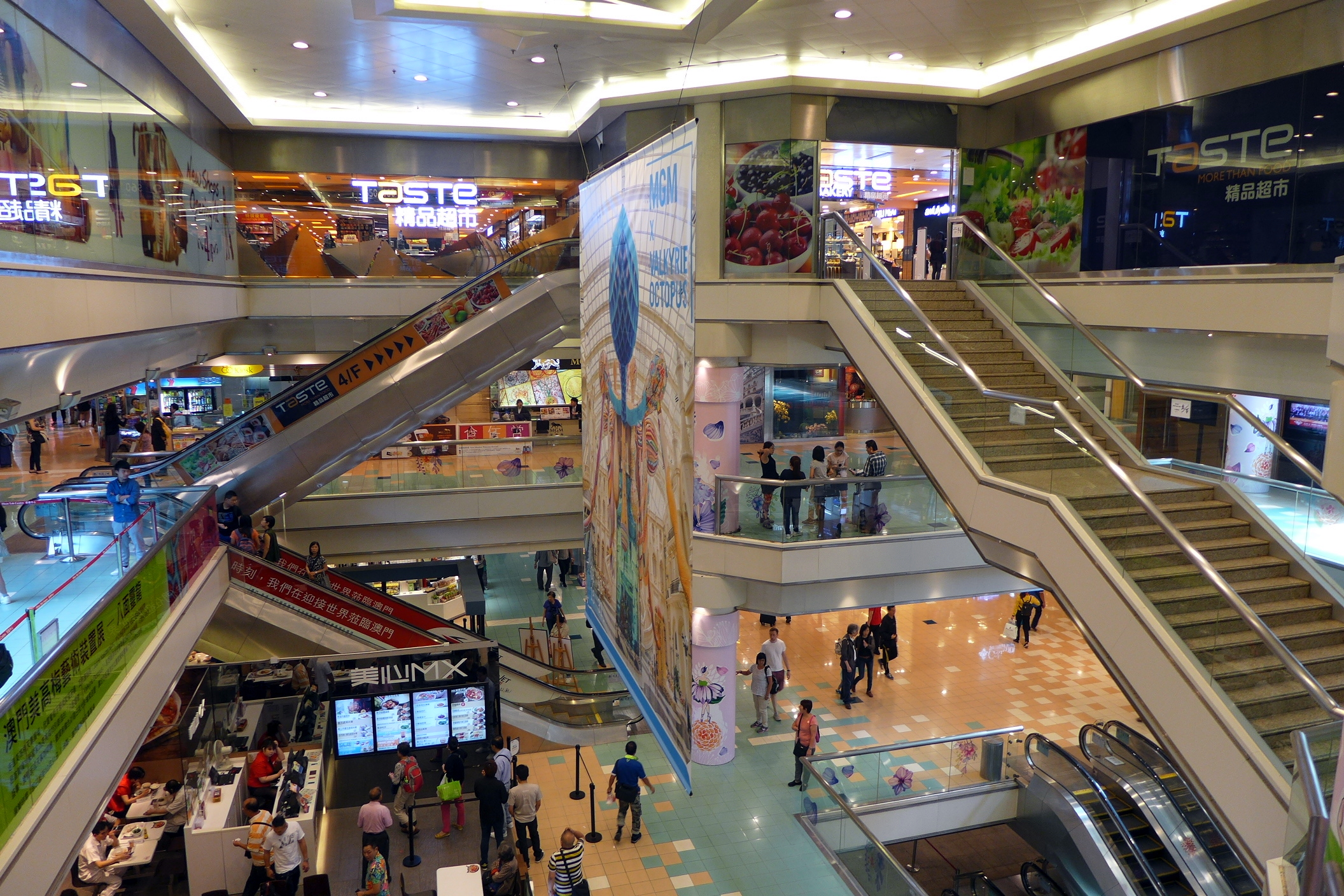
Shopping Centre in Shun Tak Centre

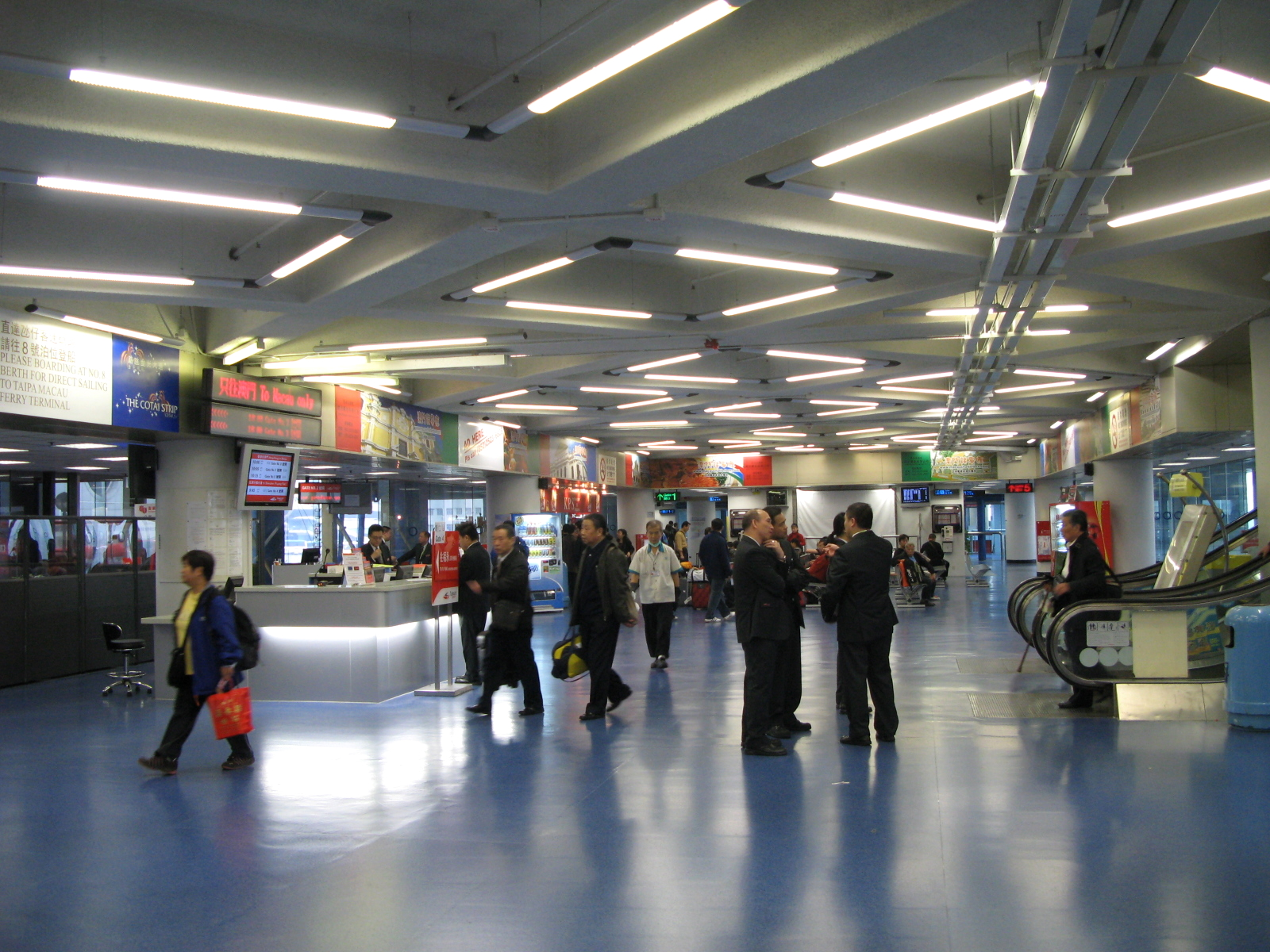
Ferry Terminal Concourse in Shun Tak Centre

Shun Tak Centre (Chinese: 信德中心; Jyutping: seon3 dak1 zung1 sam1) is a commercial and transport complex on the northern shore of Hong Kong Island in Sheung Wan, Hong Kong. It comprises a 4-storey podium containing a shopping centre and car park, two 38-storey office towers, and the Hong Kong–Macau Ferry Terminal.

Shun Tak Centre is the headquarters of Shun Tak Group, the principal Hong Kong operating company of Dr. Stanley Ho, the Macau casino tycoon.

It also has the head office of the China Merchants Group, a state-owned corporation of the People's Republic of China; and the head office of HKR International; both head offices are in the China Merchants Tower.

== History ==
The Shun Tak Centre was built on the site of the old Macau Ferry Piers and the Sheung Wan Gala Point night market. The first part, completed in 1984, was the easternmost section and No. 1 Tower, now known as China Merchants Tower. Originally No. 1 Tower was partly occupied by the Hotel Victoria, but this was never a success, and No. 1 Tower was later converted to all office use. No. 2 Tower, now called Western Tower, was built on a different orientation, giving the property on close examination a slightly asymmetric appearance.

The complex was designed by Hong Kong architecture and engineering firm Spence Robinson and built by local contractor Hip Hing Construction. Construction began in January 1981.

== Transport ==
Shun Tak Centre is a minor transport hub, with direct access to the Sheung Wan station of the MTR, a bus terminal adjacent to the east, a large taxi stand, and the piers for ferry services to Macau and China. It is also convenient to the southern portal of the Western Harbour Crossing.

== See also ==
- List of buildings and structures in Hong Kong
