= Dawn markets =

Dawn markets (Chinese: 天光墟) are street markets in Hong Kong which open early in the morning to evade the Food and Environmental Hygiene Department Hawker Control Teams (Chinese: 小販管理隊). The goods sold are cheaper than other places. They are mainly run by the elderly and the homeless. Some sell products collected from bins or donated goods.

== Background ==
There are seven dawn markets and they are mainly located in relatively poorer areas of Hong Kong (such as Sham Shui Po and Yuen Long). However, only two of the seven Dawn Markets are legal. Different Dawn Markets sell different goods. The Dawn Market in Mong Kok mainly sells goldfish, marine animals and appliances (like small aquarium and pipes) while the market in Aberdeen sells frozen fish. Tai Po Dawn Market sells fresh vegetables and fruits cultivated by the elderly. The dawn market in Sham Shui Po sells cheap clothes, household utensils and toys collected by elderly. The market at Hung Hom provides clothes, cosmetics, shoes and accessories. Sheung Shui Dawn Market is another legal market that includes nearly 200 stalls selling vegetables and fruits. Fresh fish can also be found. The hawkers in these areas will dismiss at the break of dawn to hide from inspectors.

== Sellers ==
Sellers in the Dawn Market are usually the underprivileged elderly and housewives. They sell many of those products to earn a living, though they don't always earn much from the trades. Some housewives take part in selling after their children go to school, while some prefer taking their children with them. Housewives go all out to earn more through selling, as their families have limited domestic expenses while they have to take good care of their children.

They choose to sell at those areas because the living standard in those areas are comparatively lower than other areas, where the residents are relatively poorer than those who live in other places. Apart from that, gaining a strong sense of belonging to those places is another factor that motivates them to sell products there. They help each other whenever in need and they will alert each other to run away when the Hawker Control Team comes.

== Problems ==
=== Hegemony ===
Hegemony refers to imperial dominance. It is the consequence of the fact that the government only work with single property developer. They have signed agreements to preserve the right of gaining profit of the developer which finally causes the hegemony of the developer.

The developer carries out high land-value policy, and monopolizes land management These actions cause the increase of shop's rent and even the farmers' market's rent. It also introduced chain stores into housing estates. Eventually the price of necessities rises in places such as Yuen Long, those relatively poorer areas. Therefore, residents there cannot afford the price of food and other goods for daily life. Dawn Market turns out to be a helpful platform for those people to buy goods in acceptable and reasonable price to live one's life.

== Social Responses ==
=== Hawkers ===
A licensed project called "Tin Sau Bazaar" (Chinese: 天秀墟) by the Tung Wah Group of Hospitals was approved by the government and started its business in February 2013. Some of the vendors “gave up hope” of the project, citing the problem of a lack of communication between the policy makers and the hawkers and that the project did not address the problem. A vendor from a low-social class expressed the feeling of “being caught like the terrorist” instead of receiving help from the government.

=== Non-Government Organizations ===
Community Development Alliance urged the government to issue license to the hawkers in Tin Shui Wai dawn market, which would be a win-win situation for both the hawkers and the grass roots family.

=== Government ===
Government supports for self-reliance in order to ease the burden of providing social welfare and encourage the underprivileged to enjoy their life. However, the government also concerns the hygiene and risks in these illegal markets. For example, unlicensed hawkers selling goods in public places will affect the cityscape and posed dangers to other road users. Especially when the Hawker Control Team staff work overnight shift to tackle unlicensed hawking activities, the unlicensed hawkers will panic and escape from the staff, which means they will run with a trolley of products in the street.

In response to these unlicensed hawkers who want to make a living, the government established the Tin Sau Bazaar. However, the scheme is not successful, owing to the unsatisfactory conditions of its infrastructure and ancillary facilities. The majority of citizens are more willing to go to the illegal Dawn markets.
