= Tin Sau Bazaar =

Coordinates: 22.4657°N 114.0007°E

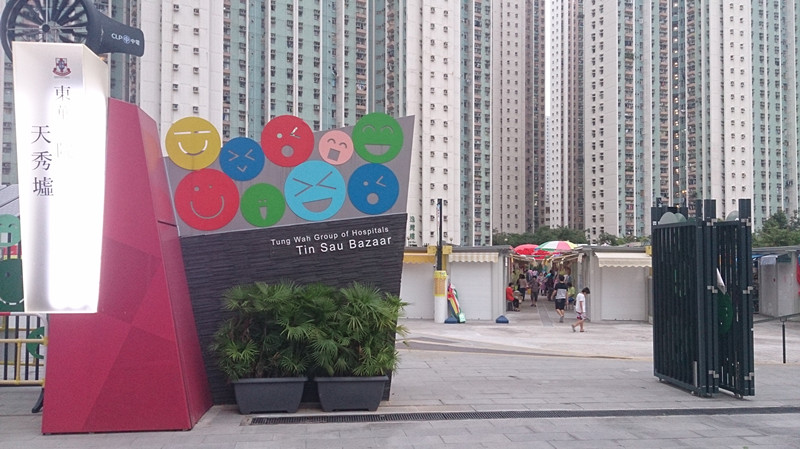
- Entrance
- Location: No. 18 Tin Sau Road Tin Shui Wai
- Opening date: 8 February 2013; 13 years ago
- Management: Tung Wah Group of Hospitals
- Environment: Outdoor
- Days normally open: Seven days a week
- Website: tsb.tungwahcsd.org
- Interactive map of Tin Sau Bazaar

Tin Sau Bazaar (Chinese: 天秀墟), initially called Tin Shui Wai Bazaar, is opposite Tin Fu Court on Tin Sau Road in Tin Shui Wai, New Territories, Hong Kong. Occupying approximately 3,800 square metres, the bazaar is operated and managed by the Tung Wah Group of Hospitals (TWGHs), a non-profit non-governmental organisation (NGO). Construction began in January 2013 and the bazaar officially began operations on 8 February 2013.

== History ==
On 1 September 2012, the Chief Secretary for Administration Carrie Lam announced that the Hong Kong government had agreed to allocate a piece of vacant 3,800-square-metre land for the purpose of setting up a flea market in Tin Shui Wai. The government would provide funding of HK$10 million to support the establishment of a bazaar there. The bazaar would comprise around 200 stationary stalls.

The government started a consultation procedure the same month and expected the bazaar would service the public after half a year.

On 21 October 2012, the representatives of Tin Shui Wai Hawkers Concern Group expressed that the proposals delivered by the TWGHs failed to take care of the needs of the local community, hoping the government to set up a bazaar management committee to allow the participation of experienced hawkers. As for the TWGHs, the spokesperson replied that they would continue mutual communication by launching an estate-wide consultation.

On 1 November 2012, the government opened a nearly one-month application for the license of operation. According to the relevant documents submitted by the Home Affairs Department, over 3,800 applicants applied—24 applicants competing for one stall on average—meaning the competition for the license was stiff. Selection procedures took place on 14 December, and the results of offerings would be announced in January 2013.

On 5 January 2013, the Community Development Alliance of Tin Shui Wai, the Hong Kong Institute of Planners and other organizations launched a workshop discussing issues about internal stall design and managerial ways, followed by submitting reports to the TWGHs and the relevant government authorities.

On 1 February 2013, Tin Sau Bazaar began pilot operation. The official opening up of Tin Sau Bazaar took place on 8 February.

== Objectives ==
As suggested by the government and the TWGHs, the expected outcomes of Tin Sau Bazaar include improving the quality of life of local residents by providing more alternative shopping options; revitalizing and rejuvenating local economy by creating more job opportunities; improving local noise and hygiene problems by stopping the morning hawking behaviors in Dawn Market in Tin Shui Wai; and ultimately helping local disadvantaged residents to become independent and self-sufficient.

== Problems ==
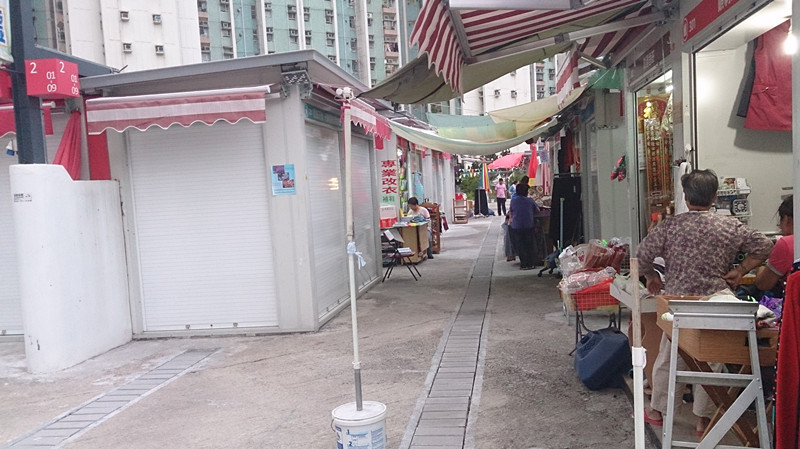
Few people in the streets

Since its opening, shopkeepers in Tin Sau Bazaar have reported that there is a lack of consumers. This makes it hard to earn a living, and some suffer losses. Some vendors complained that the government did not give enough support. The arising problems of Tin Sau Bazaar include the following.

=== Location ===
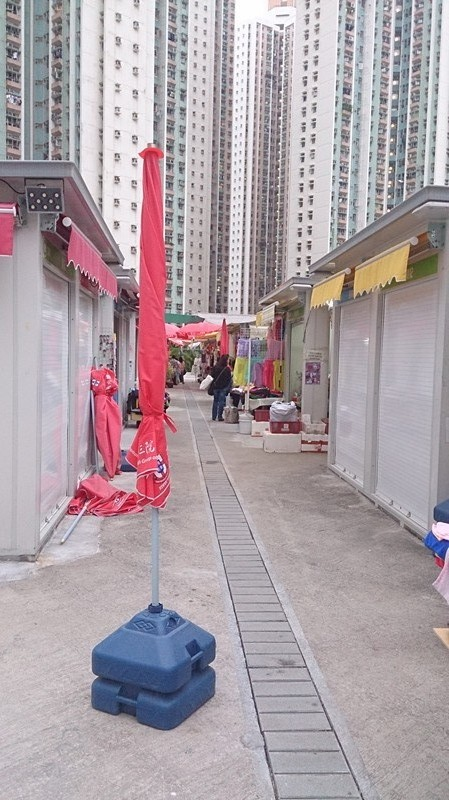
Few shops are open.

Tin Sau Bazaar is on a plot of land on Tin Sau Road, near Tin Fu Court and Tin Yat Estate, that had lain unused for many years. Tin Sau Road is in Tin Shui Wai North, very far from the Tin Shui Wai town centre. The bazaar is mainly convenient to those living in Tin Yat Estate or Tin Fu Court.

Citizens living in other public housing estates may find it difficult to find the bazaar, and it is inconvenient for them to buy daily necessities. This may lower the accessibility of Tin Sau Bazaar and this is why not many people are attracted by the bazaar.

=== Transport ===
For people living in Tin Shui Wai, the public transport that can reach Tin Sau Bazaar are Light Rail and bus. No shuttle bus is provided. After getting off the bus or Light Rail, it is a five-minute walk to Tin Sau Bazaar. Therefore, not many Tin Shui Wai residents are willing to go there and purchase items.

For residents from other districts, West Rail is the fastest transport to get to Tin Shui Wai. After alighting from the West Rail, there is a 15-minute ride from Light Rail or bus to Tin Sau Bazaar. It is not very convenient for visitors.

=== Design ===
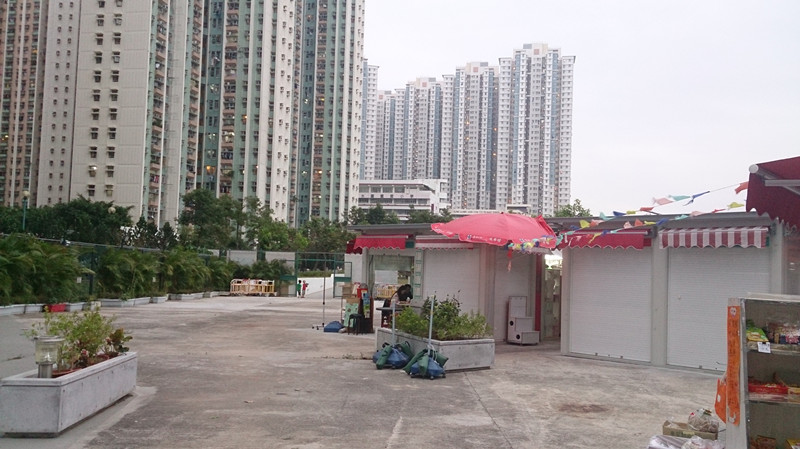
It is behind the housing.

The design of Tin Sau Bazaar has many problems.

Firstly, the entrance does not face the housing. The nearby facilities are some basketball courts and parks. If residents want to enter the bazaar, they have to walk for a long way to find the entrance, which is troublesome. Residents may prefer to patronize local supermarkets or markets instead. On the other side of the bazaar, there is a long, tall wire netting encircling the area. That means everyone should enter the bazaar only by that entrance.

Secondly, the facilities are far from enough. Tin Sau Bazaar has poor covering, ventilation, and air-conditioning systems. When it rains, few are willing to go there and purchase goods. When it is summertime, the high temperature and scorching sunshine make buyers feel uncomfortable. The design of the bazaar is inconvenient and that deters consumers.

=== Promotion and publicity ===
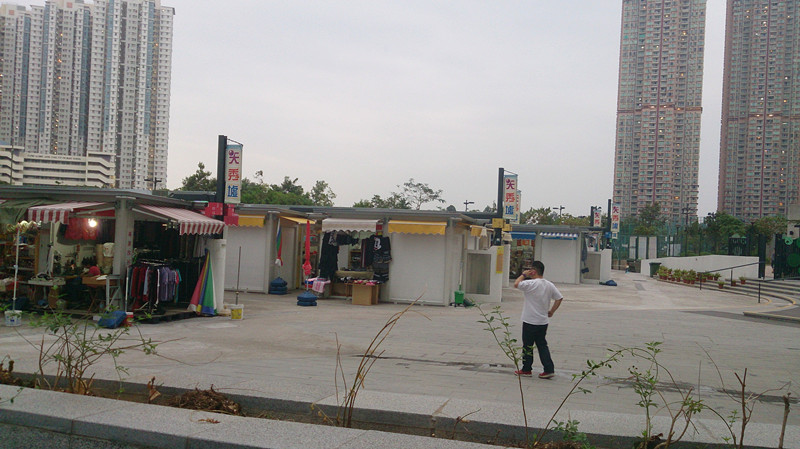
Difficult to see some banners

The government is mostly responsible for the funding of setting up the stalls and construction procedures, rather than the promotional issues. In other words, the TWGHs is responsible for the publicity efforts and the related expenditure. There are not many promotional activities especially around the few months after the opening up of Tin Sau Bazaar. Another inadequacy is about the issue of banners. The banners are far from enough, and they are difficult to be noticed.

=== Business strategies ===
The hawkers are largely low-skilled grassroots; most of them lack business acumen. Although some of their goods sold are generally a bit cheaper than those sold in local supermarkets, their products (which include clothing, footwear, foodstuffs and grocery items) lack distinguishable and distinctive features. This discourages local consumers and consumers outside Tin Shui Wai District from purchasing in the bazaar as they find the items unattractive.

== Transport ==
The market is roughly 250 metres from the Tin Sau stop and Tin Yat stop of the Light Rail. These stops are a 12-minute ride from Tin Shui Wai station of the West Rail line.

== See also ==
- Hawkers in Hong Kong
- Link REIT
