= Night market =

Street markets operating primarily at night

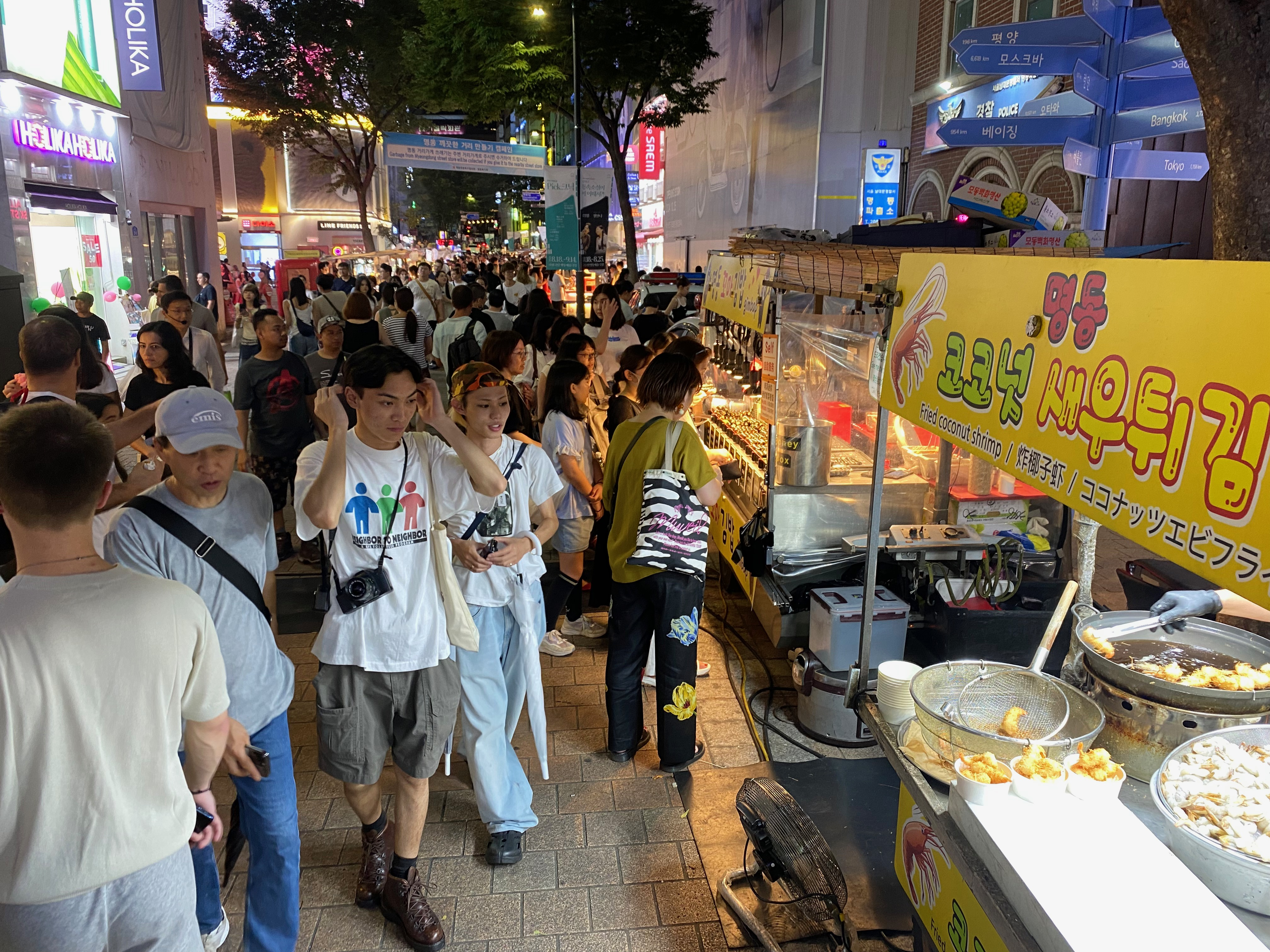
Myeong-dong night market, Seoul

Night markets or night bazaars (Chinese: 夜市) are street markets which operate at night and are generally dedicated to more leisurely strolling, shopping, and eating than more businesslike day markets. The culture of night markets originates from China and have spread globally with overseas Chinese populations. They are typically open-air markets popular in East Asia, Southeast Asia, and Chinatowns in several other regions of the world.

== History ==
The concept of the night market traces its roots back to the medieval Chinese Tang dynasty. The Tang government put strict sanctions on night markets and their operations in A.D. 836. Towards the end of the Tang dynasty, economic expansion led to less state regulation and restrictions being lifted on night markets. During the Song dynasty (960–1279), night markets played a central role in Chinese nightlife. These markets were found in corners of large cities. Some stayed open for twenty-four hours. Song period night markets are also known to have included restaurants and brothels due to being frequently located near business districts and red light districts.

== Geographical spread ==
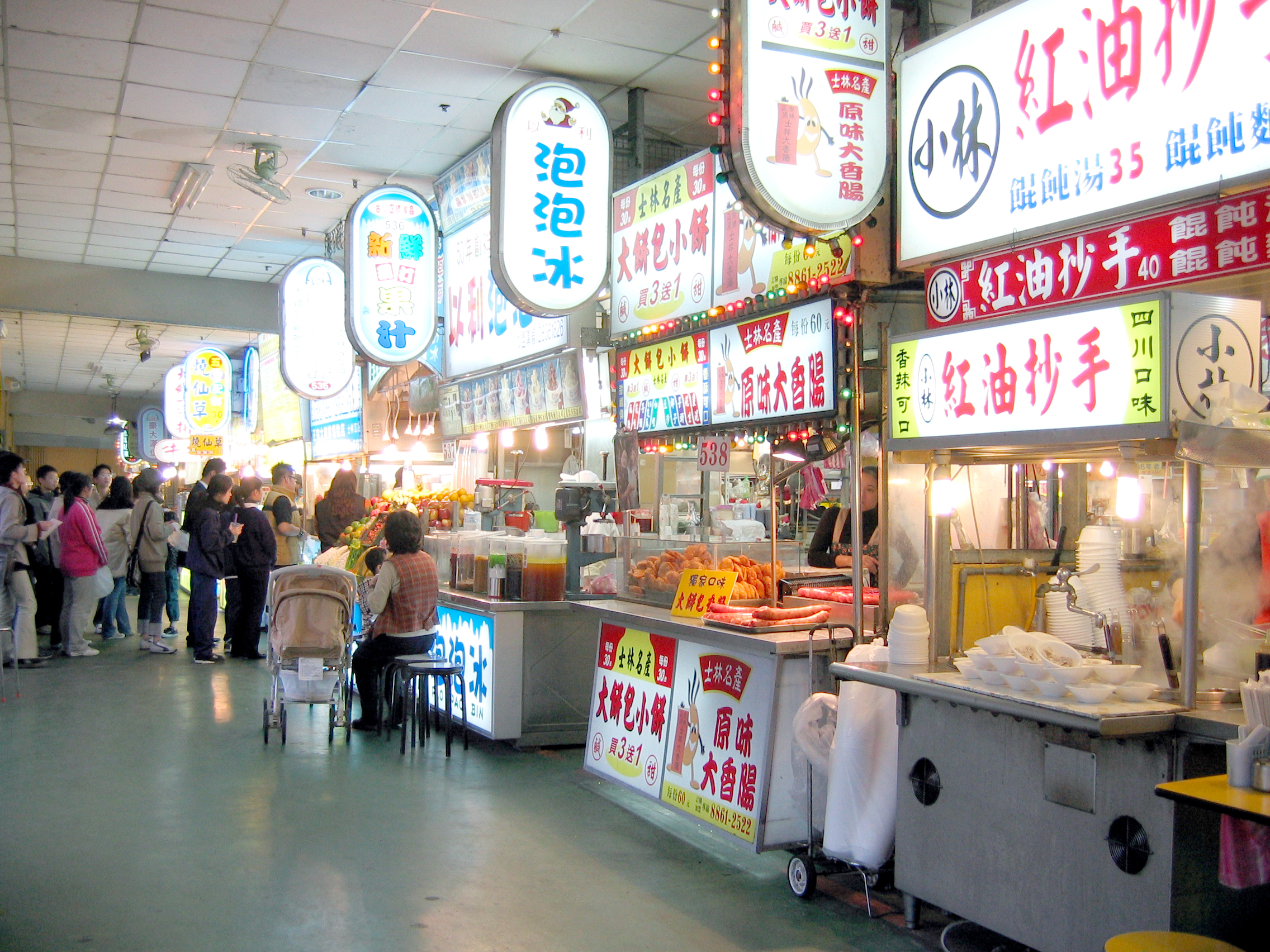
Taipei's Shilin Night Market indoor area.

Night markets are popular in Chinese culture; they are especially common in East and Southeast Asia, found in China, Hong Kong, Macau, Taiwan, as well as Overseas Chinese communities across Thailand, Cambodia, Vietnam, Singapore, Malaysia, Indonesia to the Philippines. Nevertheless, night markets are more prominent within ethnic Chinese economic and cultural activities. Some well-known night markets exist in Taipei, Kaohsiung, Shanghai, Beijing, Guangzhou, Hong Kong, Singapore, and Bangkok, but they also exist in Chinatowns worldwide.

=== Taiwan ===
Taiwan has over 700 night markets. The larger and more formal of these markets might take place in purpose-built marketplaces while smaller or more informal ones tend to occupy streets or roads that are normal thoroughfares by day.

=== Brunei, Indonesia, Malaysia, and Singapore ===
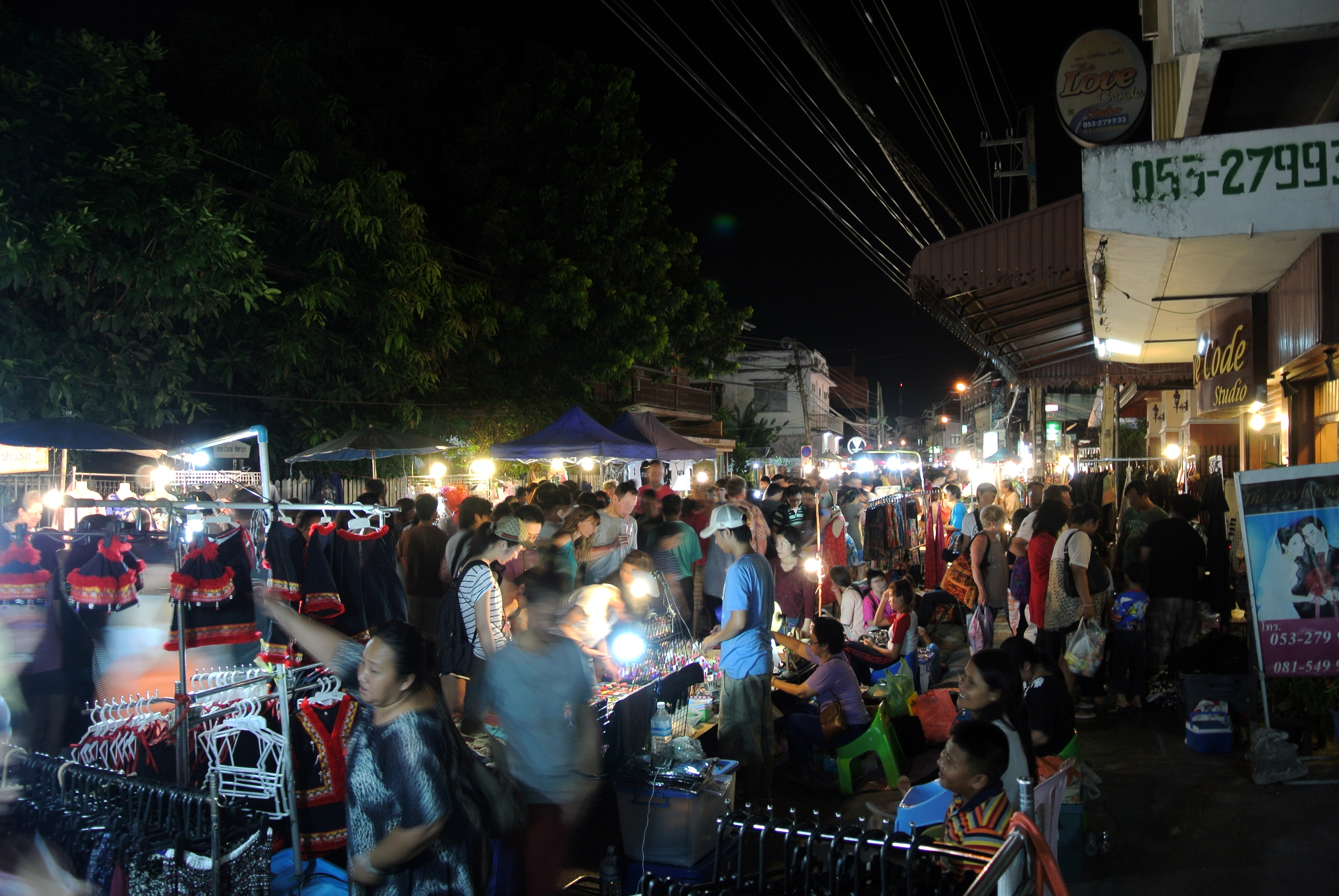
Night market in Chiang Mai, Thailand

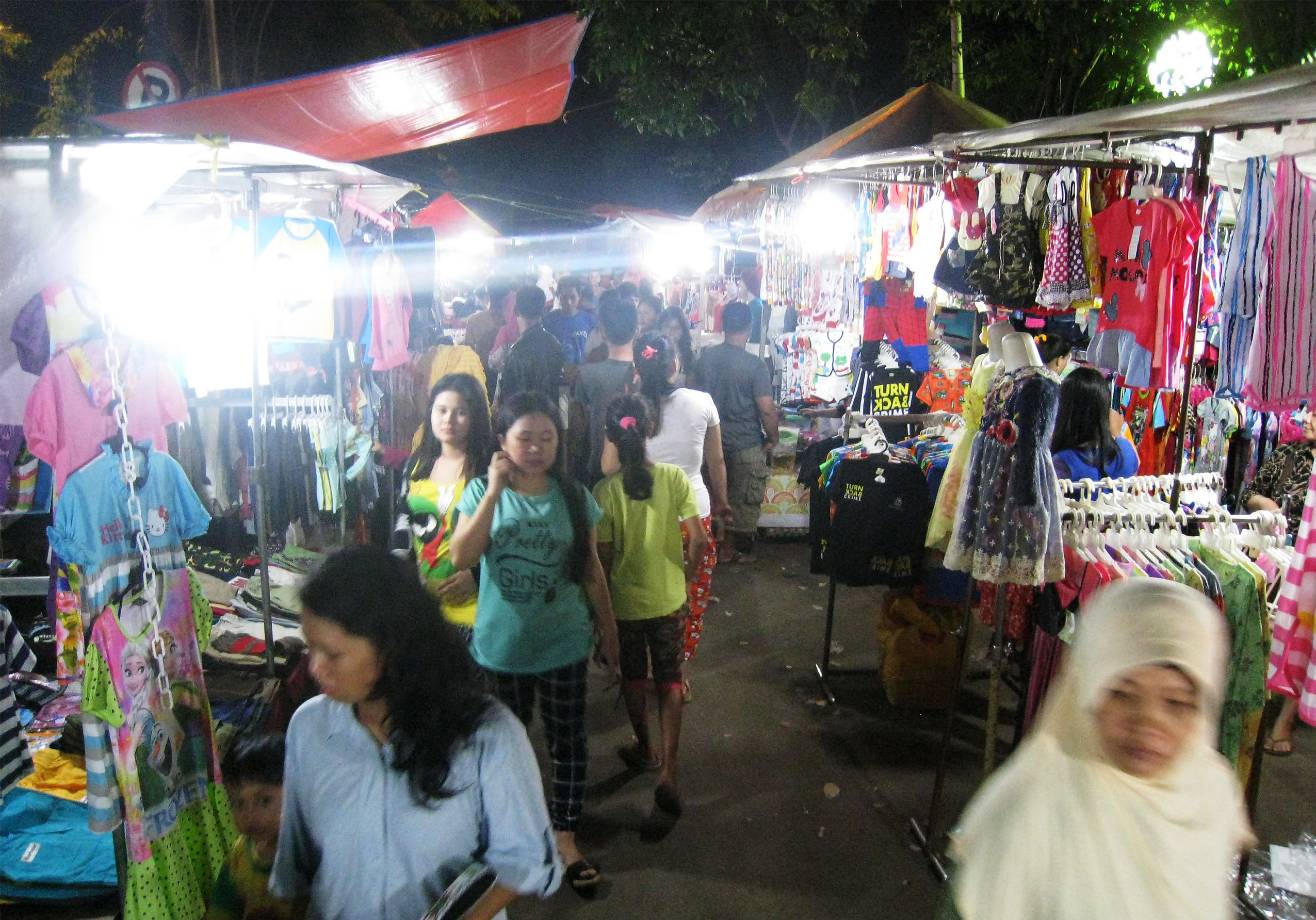
Pasar malam in Jakarta, Indonesia.

Night markets are commonly known as Pasar Malam by the locals, which literally means night market, "pasar" being related to "bazaar" in Persian or also the meaning "market" in Malay/Indonesian, and "malam" meaning "night". A pasar malam is a street market in Indonesia, Malaysia and Singapore that opens in the evening, usually in residential neighbourhoods.

It brings together a collection of stalls that usually sell goods such as fruit, vegetables, snacks, toys, clothes, movie discs and ornaments at cheap or at least reasonable prices. A pasar malam often takes place only one to a few days of the week, as the traders rotate around different neighbourhoods on different days of the week. Haggling over prices is a common practice at such markets.

Today, several kecamatan (district) in Jakarta and also other provinces in Indonesia, hold weekly pasar malam, usually held every Saturday night in nearby alun-alun square, open fields or marketplaces. In Indonesia, pasar malam has become a weekly recreational place for local families. Other than selling variety of goods and foods, some pasar malam also offer kiddy rides and carnival games, such as mini carousel or mini train ride.

=== New Zealand ===
Night markets are popular in New Zealand, both in major cities such as Auckland and Wellington, as well as in smaller regional cities and towns such as Hamilton, Flaxmere, and Waitara. The first night market in Auckland was opened in 2010 in Pakuranga. By 2019, night markets were found in Auckland seven nights a week, typically in the carparks of shopping malls. These markets offer food from Asia and Europe, as well as Māori and Pacific cuisines. There are also specialist pop-up night markets that serve one kind of food (such as noodles). In 2019, food delivery services from Auckland night markets were also introduced. In 2020, during the COVID-19 pandemic, the night markets in Auckland introduced the use of an app for contactless orders and payments so that social distancing can be managed.

=== North America ===
Night markets are also hosted in various areas of North America, particularly in communities with large Chinese populations in the Pacific Northwest and the West Coast.

==== United States ====
In San Francisco's Chinatown, a large night market with almost 100 booths takes place every autumn Saturday in Portsmouth Square. The 626 Night Market, held at Santa Anita Park in Arcadia, California, is stated to be the largest Asian night market in the United States. The Food Trust in Philadelphia operates a unique variant of a night market, with it being a temporary event only active for one night before moving somewhere else in the city; the market has thus far been held in East Passyunk, South Street, Northern Liberties, Mount Airy, Old City, Chinatown, and other places across the city. The Queens Night Market is held in Flushing Meadows Corona Park in New York City on Saturdays from April to October. It hosts as many as 100 vendors.

==== Canada ====
In Vancouver's Chinatown, a weekly night market ran from May to September for 17 years before being cancelled in 2014. The Richmond Night Market, the largest in North America, ran from 2000 to 2026 and saw over a million visitors each year. In Markham, Ontario, Night It Up! (formerly known as the Toronto Night Market and Asian Night Market) ran for 20 years, attracting over 100,000 visitors to the annual festival each year.

== See also ==
- Bangkok's Suan Lum Night Bazaar
- Chiang Mai Night Bazaar
- Night markets in Hong Kong
- Seoul's Dongdaemun Market
- Street food
- Taipei's Shilin Night Market
