= Kweilin Street Night Market =

Unlicenced night market in Sham Shui Po, Hong Kong

Kweilin Street Night Market (Chinese: 桂林夜市) is a commercial and social activity in which unlicenced hawkers set up their mobile food stores and stalls to sell local street foods and groceries in Kweilin Street (桂林街), Sham Shui Po, Hong Kong.

Typically, the street provides various goods and meets residents' needs with stores, shops and restaurants. Yet, during the first to third days of Chinese New Year, which are public holidays in Hong Kong, shops in Kweilin Street would be closed and Food and Environmental Hygiene Department (FEHD) officers who are supposed to crack down on those unlicensed hawkers would go off duty. Hawkers seize the opportunity to develop their businesses there, attracting large amounts of locals. However, the night market is controlled by the Hong Kong government due to safety, traffic and noise problems.

== Characteristics ==
Kweilin Street Night Market only takes place in the first three days of the Lunar New Year. As most restaurants are closed during that period, the hawkers will set up stalls at night to sell foods since there is a large potential market. The hawkers in the night market are not licensed by the government and they operate illegally. Officers of the Food and Environmental Hygiene Department will regularly dispel the hawkers.

At night, some hawkers set up some stalls on the street and sell traditional and local cooked foods such as steam rice noodle rolls, stinky tofu, curry fish balls, sausages and other snacks. Also, some street stalls sell goods such as clothes, groceries, dolls and second-hand items.

Due to its proximity to Golden Computer Plaza, which has a variety of electronic gadgets, and plenty of eateries, it has already become a popular place for young people to hang out. As the stream of people is high in Kweilin Street, it appeals to a lot of residents to set up stalls and thus the prosperous night market is born while this place also brings older generation priceless memories of a bygone era.

== Opinions surrounding Kweilin Street Night Market ==
=== Benefits ===
The market helps to preserve of traditional culture. Hawker culture has existed since after World War II. It sticks with the development of Hong Kong and becomes one of the local cultures. It is believed that hawkers represent a part of Hong Kong’s culture and the existence of the night market will maintain the culture and collective memories belonged to local people.

The night market can boost in tourism of Hong Kong. It is believed that the markets can be tourist attractions if managed properly. Amid the need for new tourist spots to increase its attractiveness, the preservation of night market may help to attract more tourists. Also, the market can alleviate the difficult situation of impoverished people. Old, unskilful people are always unpopular in labour market; yet, have to meet their own needs. They are forced to be unlicensed hawker to earn their income, to risk and violate laws. If night market is made permanent, they can find a way to earn more money.

=== Liabilities ===
There is a concern about safety problem of the food in the night market. As the hawkers are unlicensed, there is a potential risk that the food might contain bacteria which are harmful to the safety of customers. Also, the stalls are located near the road and the exhaust gas of car may contaminate the foods.

Also, there are a traffic problem that appeared in those three days. Traffic congestion and accidents could easily happen because most of the cooked food stalls and vendors stall are set up near the road.

Besides, environmental hygiene problem is another concern. Some customers, who are insufficient of civility, would litter the used skewer and plastic cup which can influence the hygienic problem nearby and stacking of refuse was serious because no one will clean up the rubbish in that period. In addition, the stalls will release soot during making processes of deep-fried intestines and barbecued food. The smell of cooking spreads to the houses which can affect the living environment of local residents.

In addition, the customers will produce clamour. Some residents report the noise problem to the district councillor and it will affect the living quality. As the night market starts in the evening, the noise can influence the sleeping quality of the local residents.

== Future direction for development ==
In March 2015, in Subcommittee on Hawker Policy under Panel on Food Safety and Environmental Hygiene, Dr Ko Wing-man, Secretary for Food and Health in Hong Kong introduced three suggestions to deal with the issues related to those unlicensed selling foods. The suggestions are listed as below

=== Consider the issue of new "Dai Pai Tong" licences ===
Food and Environmental Hygiene Department prepares to consider issuing new "Dai Pai Tong" (the operation of on-street fixed-pitches selling cooked food or light refreshment) licences" if district councils agree on it.

=== Consider converting existing public market with low occupancy into off-street cooked food centre ===
Department suggest offering some available sites as food centre for hawkers to provide various traditional local food. The centres could be run by social enterprises with planning and management instead of developing it like public market of Hong Kong which is lack of adaptability and responsiveness to business environment.

=== Set up district-led open-air hawker bazaars and night markets ===
On the premise of having the support from district council, finding appropriate venues and maintaining standard of environmental hygiene and food safety, government will be supportive of those applications for setting up bazaars and night markets.

== See also ==
- Hong Kong street food
- Sham Shui Po Night Market, nearby market
