= Weekend markets in Hong Kong =

In Hong Kong, there are organizers providing venues for small enterprises to sell their products. Many owners of the Instagram shops make use of the venues to turn their online business into physical retail stores. Weekend markets in Hong Kong consist of stalls hawking everything from jewelry to beauty products, from clothing to shoes and from traditional food to organic vegetables which will be mentioned as follows.

== Origin and history ==
The idea of weekend markets in Hong Kong come from London retail markets and have become popular since 2000s. The Hong Kong government has made great contribution to this retail culture. In 2013, The Hong Kong Cultural Centre launched the "Creative Market in Partnership” for creative talents to showcase their works. Experienced civil organizations including Po Leung Kuk and the Hong Kong Young Women's Christian Association were asked to set up thematic creative markets and provide helpers there. In short, the weekend markets provide a platform for young people to unleash their talent, for the racial minority to promote their cultural products and for the mentally disabled to make a living, together making our culture more diverse.

== Features ==
Weekend markets have always been a channel for people to spend time with friends and family. The sellers specialize in a particular type of goods, below are some examples of weekend markets in Hong Kong.

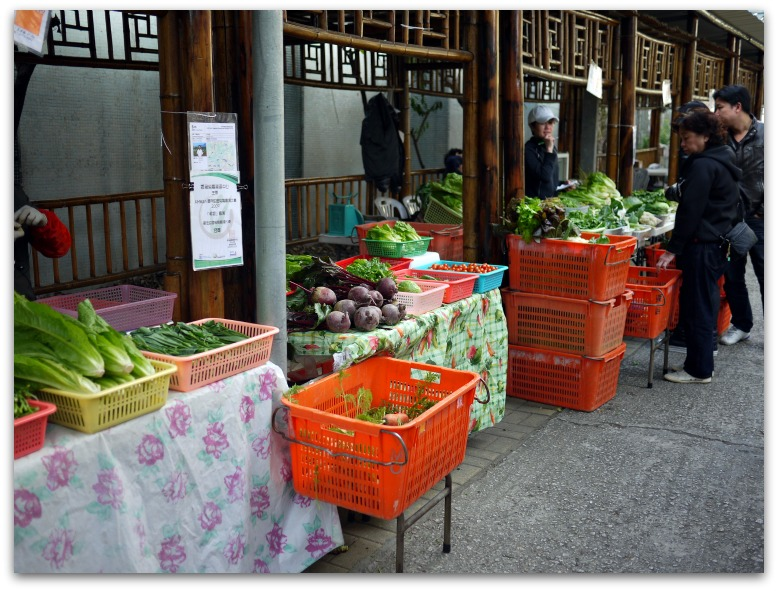
organic vegetables grown locally are sold

=== Organic products - Organic Farmers’ Markets ===
There are about seven weekend Farmers’ Markets in Hong Kong selling organic vegetables that are grown locally, including Tai Po Farmers’ Markets on Tai Wo Road and Tuen Mun Farmers' Market on Castle Peak Road. The stall holders are farmers who came from the New Territories. They cooperate with the organizer Federation of Vegetable Marketing Co-operative Societies to run their markets which attract over 3000 citizens every weekend.

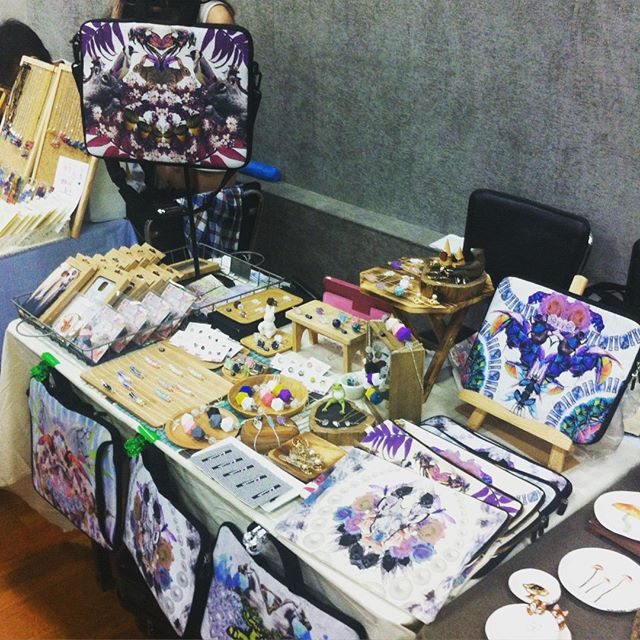
stalls selling well-designed clothes, handicrafts and accessories

=== Handicrafts and DIY products - D2 Place Weekend Markets ===
D2 Place is the new cultural and creativity hub in West Kowloon where people regularly organize weekend markets, aiming to promote local culture and encourage young people to develop their own business with the mission of "Small Shops with Big Ideas". There are over 125 stalls selling well-designed clothes, handicrafts, accessories, snacks and an array of free workshops teaching customers to make natural skin care products by themselves. More than that, it gets citizens closer to the latest fashions news, music performances and shopping experiences.

=== Food and gallery - PMQ Night Markets ===
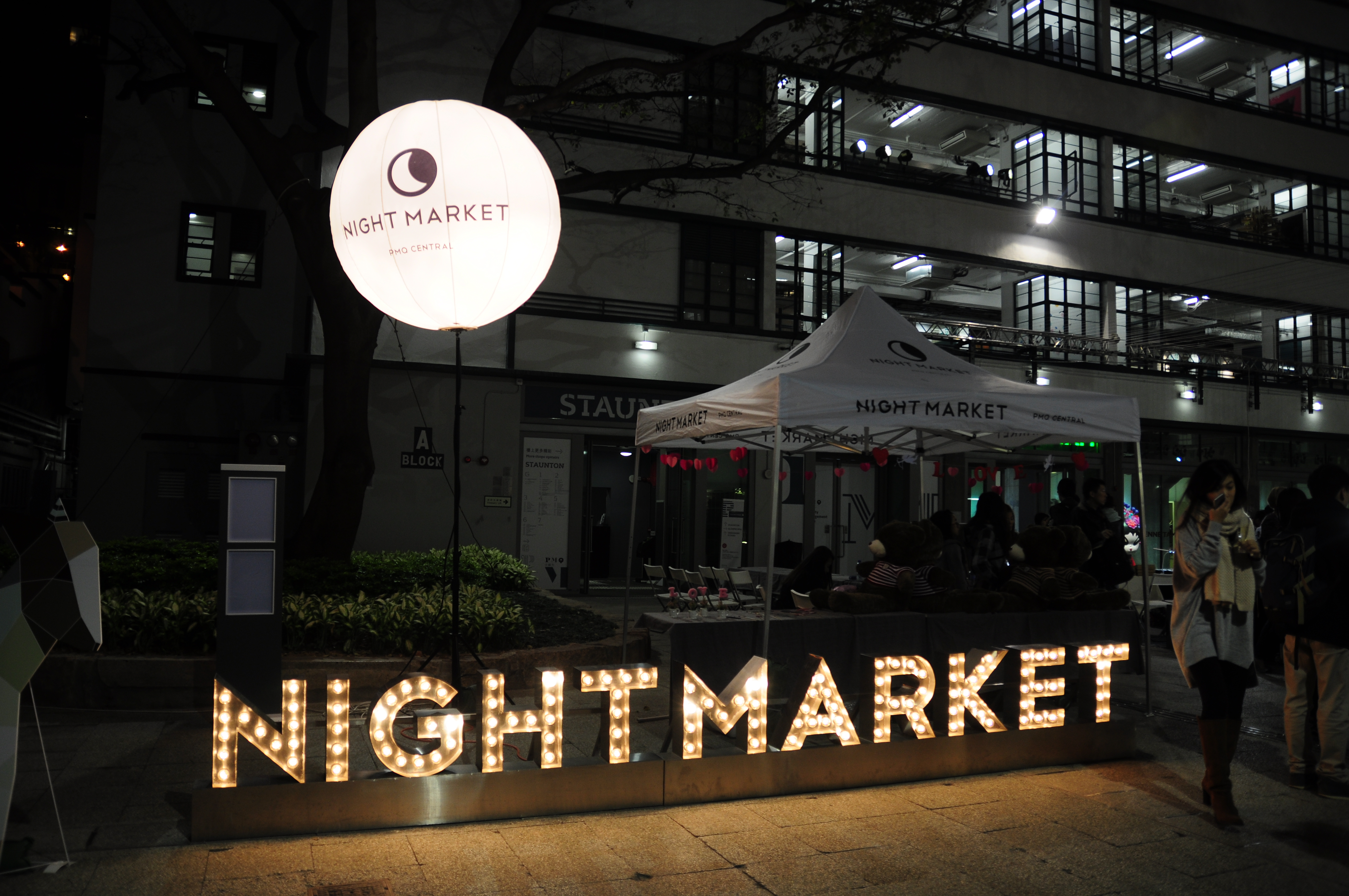
This night-time market is a cluster of chefs, craftspeople, musicians and artists

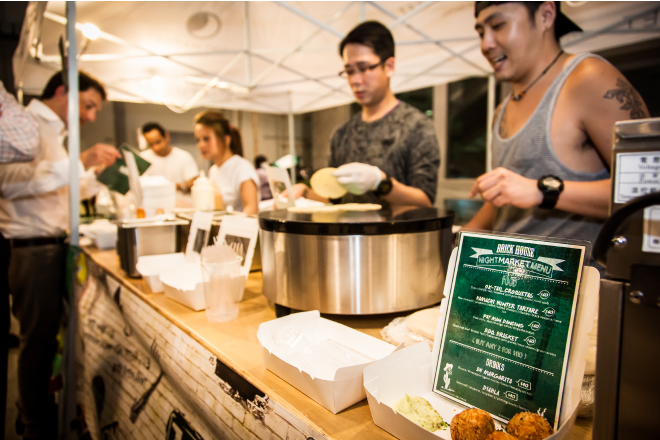
food stalls in PMQ selling extraordinary food

This night-time market is a cluster of chefs, craftspeople, musicians and artists, and will be housed in the select weekends throughout the year in the former police building in Central (known as the Police Married Quarters, or PMQ for short). The night market consists of booths displaying well-designed products of local artists, live performances by children and local singers. There are food stalls selling extraordinary food including cupcakes, wedding cookies and artisan bread, they could be instantly made according to customer's requests.

== Chances ==
The society benefits from weekend markets on the following three aspects.

=== Cultural aspect ===
As most of the weekend markets in Hong Kong are promoting unique handicrafts and gadgets such as DIY phone cases, DIY natural soaps and traditional commodities, It encourages the development of local creative industry and cultural preservation when more people appreciate the handmade traditional products. There have been Israeli designers exchanging ideas with the local brands to create jewelries and paper toys in the weekend markets, and this foster cultural exchange between Hong Kong and other countries.

=== Economic aspect ===
Weekend markets encourage the growth of gross domestic product by encouraging people to purchase the merchandise there. Also, they become tourist attractions and bring benefits to the shops nearby to increase tourism revenue in Hong Kong. In PMQ Night Markets, pop-up design shops provide a platform for the overseas designers to crossover ideas and do business with the local brands, which help develop the local retail industry.

=== Social aspect ===
In the weekend markets, people are recruited to operate the booths there. Teenagers, freelance workers and retailers can promote their innovative and exclusive products, as well as farmers can sell fresh organic vegetables. Due to these two advantages, the employment number can be increased. This helps improve the living standard of Hong Kong people.

== Challenges ==
=== Promotion ===
Most products sold in weekend markets are created by young people and are not considered as famous brands. Sellers there need to seek different ways to promote their shops and products. Most of the sellers rely on online promotion and need to update the Instagram and Facebook page frequently through using large number of hashtags, seeking sponsored posts and product reviews on YouTube to grab customers’ attentions, which is quite time-consuming.

=== Stability of location ===
Due to limited land supply in Hong Kong, available lands and booths are limited. Most of them are rented for 1 to 3 months, which is a short period of time. Sellers need to search for new sites and change their selling places continuously which may not be easy for customers to find and visit. Therefore, this may discourage them from purchasing.

=== Accessibility ===
For organic farmers’ markets, in order to reduce the transportation distance and perishability of agricultural products, many farmers’ weekend markets are located around rural areas such as Tai Hang, Sai Kung. However, these far off rural districts are relatively hard to be visited by travellers or citizens due to inconvenient traffic, which may then reduce the popularity and profit of the weekend markets.

== See also ==
- Handicraft markets in Hong Kong
