= Link REIT =

Hong Kong real estate investment trust

Link Real Estate Investment Trust
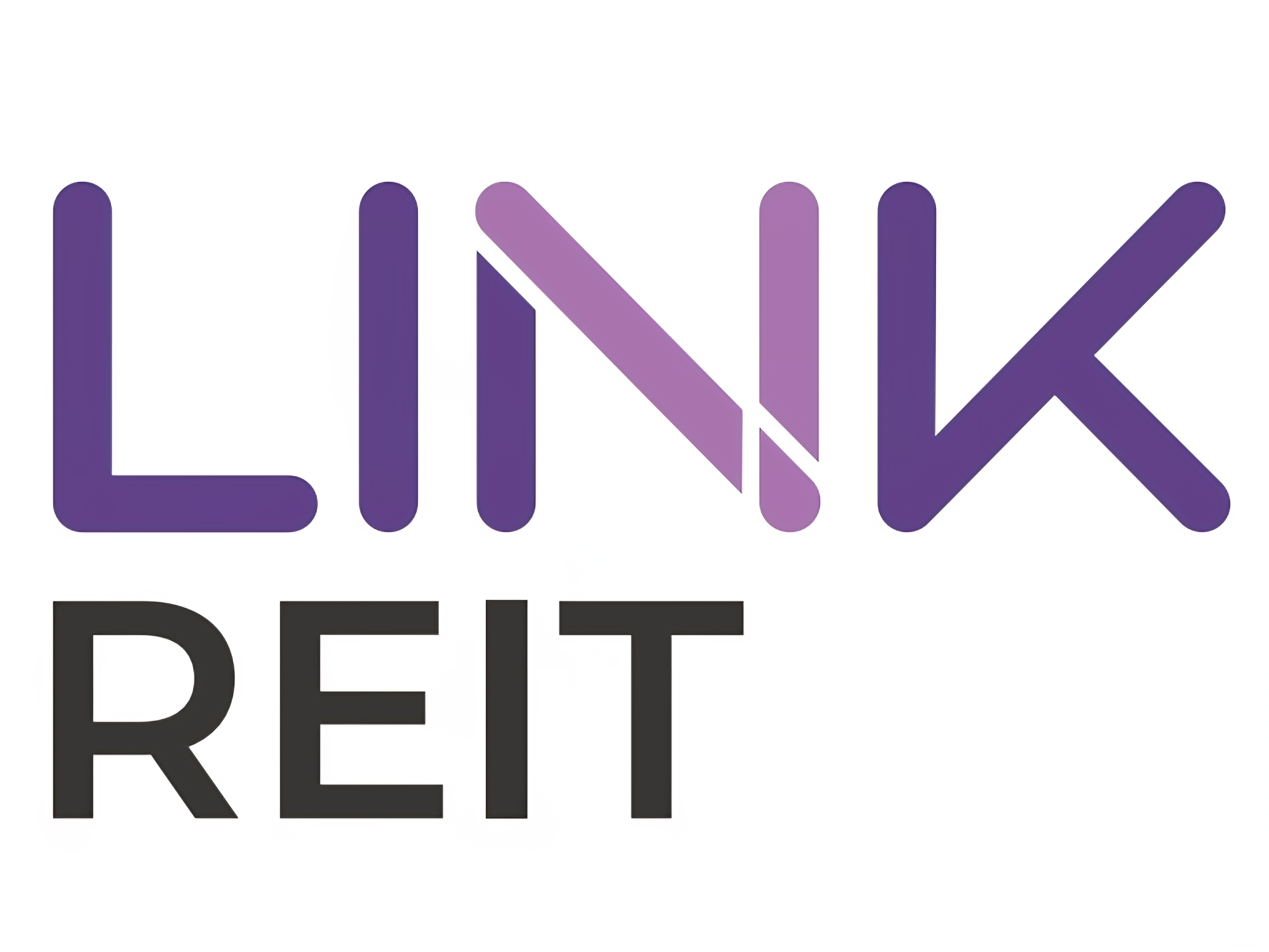

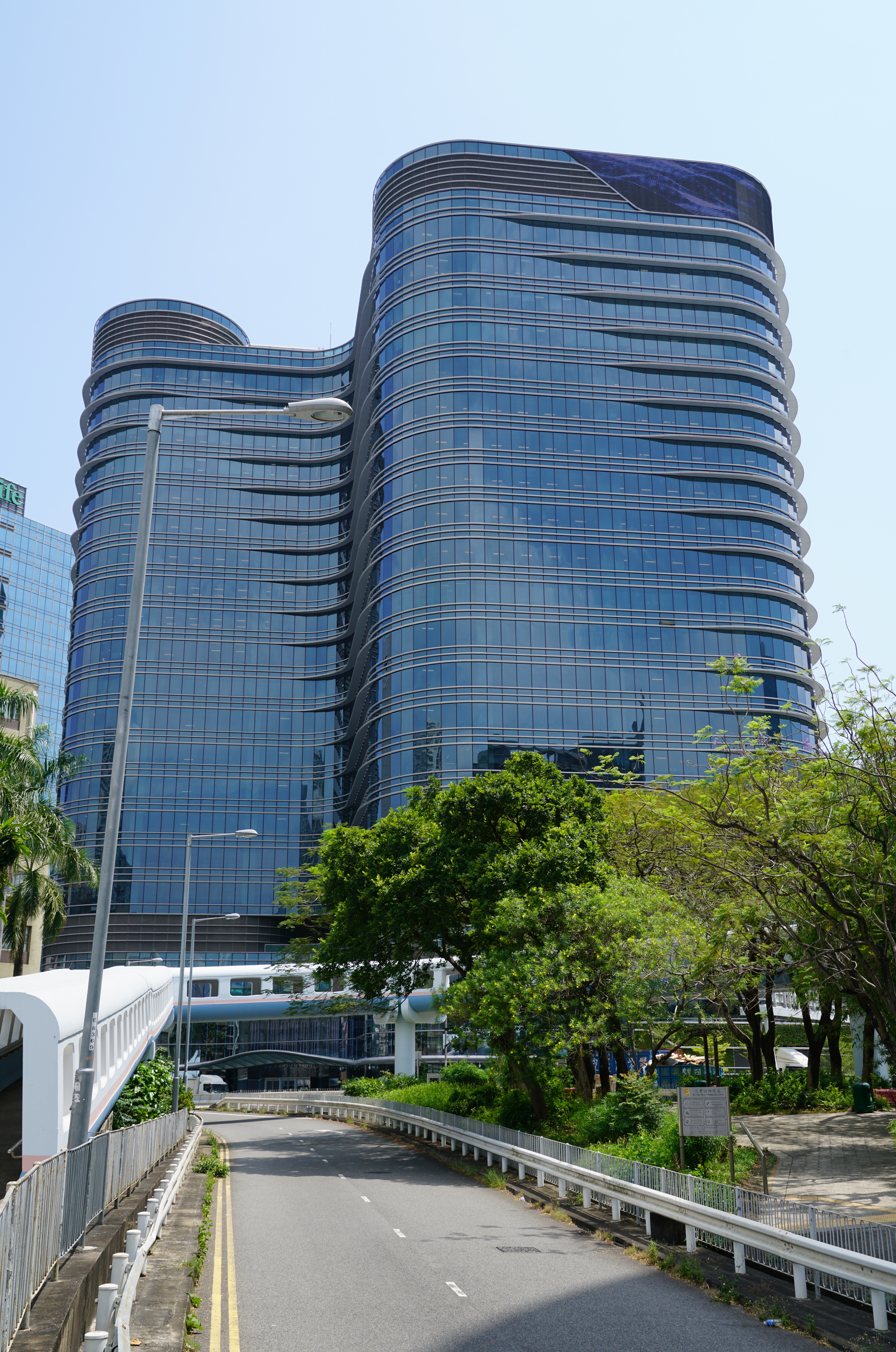
- Headquarters in Kwun Tong, Hong Kong
- Type: Public REIT
- Traded as: SEHK: 823; S&P Asia 50 component; Hang Seng Index component
- Industry: Real estate
- Founded: 2004 in Hong Kong
- Founder: Hong Kong Housing Authority
- Headquarters: 20/F, Tower 1, The Quayside, 77 Hoi Bun Road, Kwun Tong, Kowloon, Hong Kong
- Key people: George Hongchoy
- Products: Shopping centres, fresh markets, offices and car parks
- Revenue: HK$ 10.744 billion
- Total assets: HK$ 209.885 billion
- Number of employees: over 1,000
- Website: linkreit.com

Link Real Estate Investment Trust
- Traditional Chinese: 領展房地產投資信託基金
- Simplified Chinese: 领展房地产投资信托基金
Transcriptions
Standard Mandarin
- Hanyu Pinyin: Lǐng Zhǎn Fángdìchǎn Tóuzī Xìntuō Jījīn
Yue: Cantonese
- Jyutping: ling5 zin2 fong4 dei6 caan2 tau4 zi1 seon3 tok3 gei1 gam1

Link Real Estate Investment Trust (Chinese: 領展房地產投資信託基金, or 領展), previously known as The Link Real Estate Investment Trust (領匯房地產投資信託基金, or 領匯), is a wholly-owned private real estate investment trust managed by Link Asset Management Limited. It is the first real estate investment trust in Hong Kong and the largest in Asia by market capitalisation.

Link REIT's portfolio consists of 126 properties with about 9 million sq ft of retail and office space in Hong Kong, as well as 7 properties with about 6 million sq ft of retail and office space outside Hong Kong.

Link REIT has its head office at The Quayside in Kwun Tong.

== History ==
The LINK REIT was established by the Hong Kong government, which split off assets from the Hong Kong Housing Authority that included 151 retail facilities – mainly within public housing estates – and 79,000 parking spaces. The date for the listing was 25 November 2005, at a valuation of HK$22.02 billion (Valuation = 2,137,454,000 x HK$10.30 = HK$22.02 Billion) (US$2.82 billion). Upon privatisation, Link Reit remains tied to terms in existing tenancy agreements, but will no longer require approval from government to increase rents for new leases. However, financial analysts expected attractive dividend yields – up to 7 per cent – from the privatised company and greater commercial orientation, although some feared that the scope for increasing rental income and cutting labour costs might be limited due to most of its properties being tied to the public housing sector.

=== Initial public offering ===
IPO of The Link REIT, delayed for a year until 2005 through legal action by housing tenants worried that rents would rise, was eventually 18 times oversubscribed. About 510,000 Hong Kong residents, or seven percent of the city's population, placed US$36 billion of orders while institutional investors were ready to commit US$40 billion.

The IPO's joint global coordinators were Goldman Sachs, HSBC Holdings plc, and UBS AG. JPMorgan Chase & Co. was the financial adviser to the Housing Authority.

The proposed flotation of The Link REIT by the Housing Authority was delayed when a public housing tenant, Lo Siu-lan, challenged the legality of the proposed divestment of the properties. Lo's lawyer submitted that the Housing Authority had "breached its duty under the Housing Ordinance to provide housing to people in need. Instead, it was selling assets to a private company, which could sublet the properties at market rates rather than benefiting the underprivileged". She represented a concern among many residents of public housing that existing amenities would no longer be public and that The Link would raise rents, thereby forcing price rises in shops without due consideration of the public good. Some NGOs also were concerned that the reduced income of the Housing Authority would eventually lead to rent rises for public tenants. Lo's request for judicial review of the privatisation was rejected at the Court of First Instance and the Court of Appeal.

Since the listing in 2005, Link has engaged in a process of 'asset enhancement works', seeking to raise the value of the properties through upgraded physical structure, replacing low-end utility local shops with higher-paying brands and chains, enhanced 'customer service', and promotional activities. The Link also overhauled many of the wet markets under its management. The renovations have led to higher rents, higher prices, and the loss of local shops.

=== Acquisition of properties ===
In moves to diversify its property portfolio and mix, Link acquired the shopping mall portion of Nan Fung Centre with parking facilities in Hang Hau, from Nan Fung Group mid 2010 for a total of $1.17 billion.

In late 2010, Link acquired the shopping mall portion of Maritime Bay Shopping Mall with parking facilities in Hang Hau, from Sino Group, for a total of $588.4 million

In mid 2014, Link acquired The Lions Rise Mall with parking facilities in Wong Tai Sin, from Kerry Properties, for a total of $1.38 billion.

In 2015, The Link took its first step in purchasing by government land auction when it partnered with Nan Fung Group to buy land lot NKIL 6512 in Kwun Tong for a total of $5.86 billion in January. Then, Link surprised the market by successively making its first two purchases in mainland China, when it acquired Beijing EC Mall, for a consideration of ¥2.5 billion; it acquired two commercial buildings in Shanghai for ¥6.6 billion. The company has a target where mainland properties would not exceed 12.5% of its portfolio.

On 19 February 2016, a subsidiary of the Link purchased the Trade and Industry Department Tower in Mong Kok (formerly the Argyle Centre Tower II) from the government for a sum of HK$5.91 billion.

In April 2020, LINK REIT completed its purchase of 100 Market Street in Sydney at approximately AUD683 million from Blackstone Group. It is a building is 10-storeys office tower of 28,385 square metre above the Westfield mall in Sydney's CBD.

=== Sale of properties ===
In mid-2014, Link REIT sold four commercial properties, to four different buyers, for a total of $1.24 billion. The properties are Hing Tin Commercial Centre (in Lam Tin), Kwai Hing Shopping Centre (Kwai Chung), the Tung Hei Court shopping centre (Shau Kei Wan), and Wah Kwai Shopping Centre (Pokfulam).

In late 2015, they sold five properties, namely: Fung Wah Estate Retail and Car Park, Ka Fuk Shopping Centre, Kwong Tin Shopping Centre, Siu On Court Retail and Car Park, and Tin Wan Shopping Centre.

In late 2016, they sold five properties again, namely: Sui Wo Court Commercial Centre, On Yam Shopping Centre, Sun Tin Wai Commercial Centre, Cheung Hong Commercial Centre and Shek Wai Kok Commercial Centre.

=== Green Bond ===
In July 2016, Link REIT issue a green convertible bonds, raising US$500 million at 2.875% fixed rate due 2026.

=== Change of Name ===
On 19 August 2015, Link announced the changing of its corporate name to Link REIT. Some have alleged that the purpose of the name change is to disassociate itself from its past activities.

== Senior Leadership ==
- Chairman: Nicholas Allen (since April 2016)
- Chief Executive: George Hongchoy (May 2010 - Nov 2025)

=== List of former chairmen ===
1. Peter Wong (2004–2005)
2. Paul Cheng (2005–2007)
3. Nicholas Sallnow-Smith (2007–2016)

=== List of former chief executives ===
1. Victor So (2004–2007)
2. Ian Robbins (2007–2010)

== Reception ==
=== Economic hardship on lower classes ===
The Link was called a "bloodsucker" by public housing estate residents after the company acquired the Housing Authority shopping centres, renovated them, and raised rents. This has led to local shops being pushed out, higher prices, and the dominance of chain stores within the estates. This trend has reduced entrepreneurship opportunities for lower income people in Hong Kong's public housing estates and new towns, diminishing their chances to achieve social mobility, and has increased the cost of living.

A 2012 campaign by The Link to promote "nostalgic restaurants" in its shopping centres was widely derided on social media as hypocritical. Users on Golden Forum and Facebook wrote that the company "first killed the shops, then makes money from their death" and criticised the company for only allowing chain stores in their properties. In 2006, The Link cut thousands of staff, a move "fiercely criticised by unionists, who said Link Management had dishonoured a pledge to protect the welfare of its frontline workers when it took over the operation from the Housing Authority". The Link replied that "the job cuts were in line with private practice".

By mid 2015, NGO Link Watch (領匯監察) published a report that showed big chains made up 76 per cent of the 2,075 shops in 22 shopping centres run by the firm, but the Link's CEO claimed, "We continue to maintain roughly 60 per cent of our shops leased to smaller operators."

Anti-Link REIT protests have become increasingly common in recent years. Link REIT headquarters in Kwun Tong has been the site of demonstrations, scuffles, and sit-ins, leading the company to seek a court order to bar activists from entering the building.

=== Market management ===
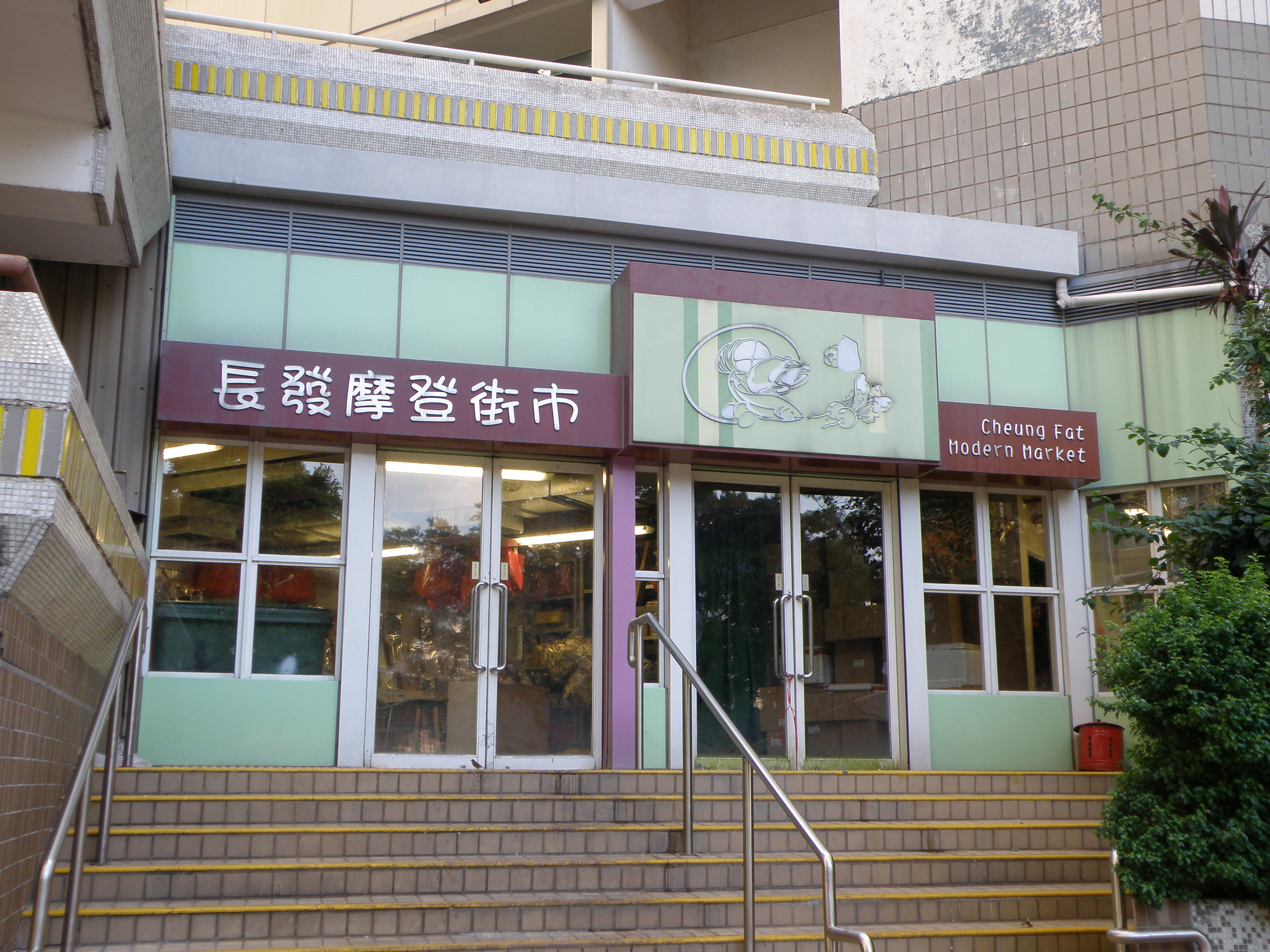
Cheung Fat Market, rebranded by The Link as "Cheung Fat Modern Market"

In addition to indoor shopping centres, The Link also acquired many local estate markets in 2005. Such markets are covered facilities with small stalls and shops let out to local residents, generally offering fresh meat and vegetables as well as daily necessities and home wares. As with the shopping centres, The Link has raised rents and also renovated some properties, leading to increased food prices and financial hardship on low-income households.

In Tin Shui Wai, where The Link exercises a near-monopoly on commercial space, the company was criticised by local residents and Legislative Councillors in 2015–16 for planning to convert the Tin Yiu Market into a conventional shopping centre. The market supplies fresh vegetables, meat, and fish to residents of the surrounding public housing estates. The next closest market is 5 to 10 minutes' walk away.

Stall operators at Cheung Fat Estate on Tsing Yi have gone on strike, in 2010 and 2016, to protest rent increases. By the latter strike it was reported that rents had doubled in ten years. Some local residents stated that they visit a government-run market in Tsuen Wan instead owing to the higher prices at Cheung Fat. The Cheung Fat stall owners also protested the outsourcing of the market's management to Uni-China (Market) Management Limited, which they feared will lead to untenable rent increases.

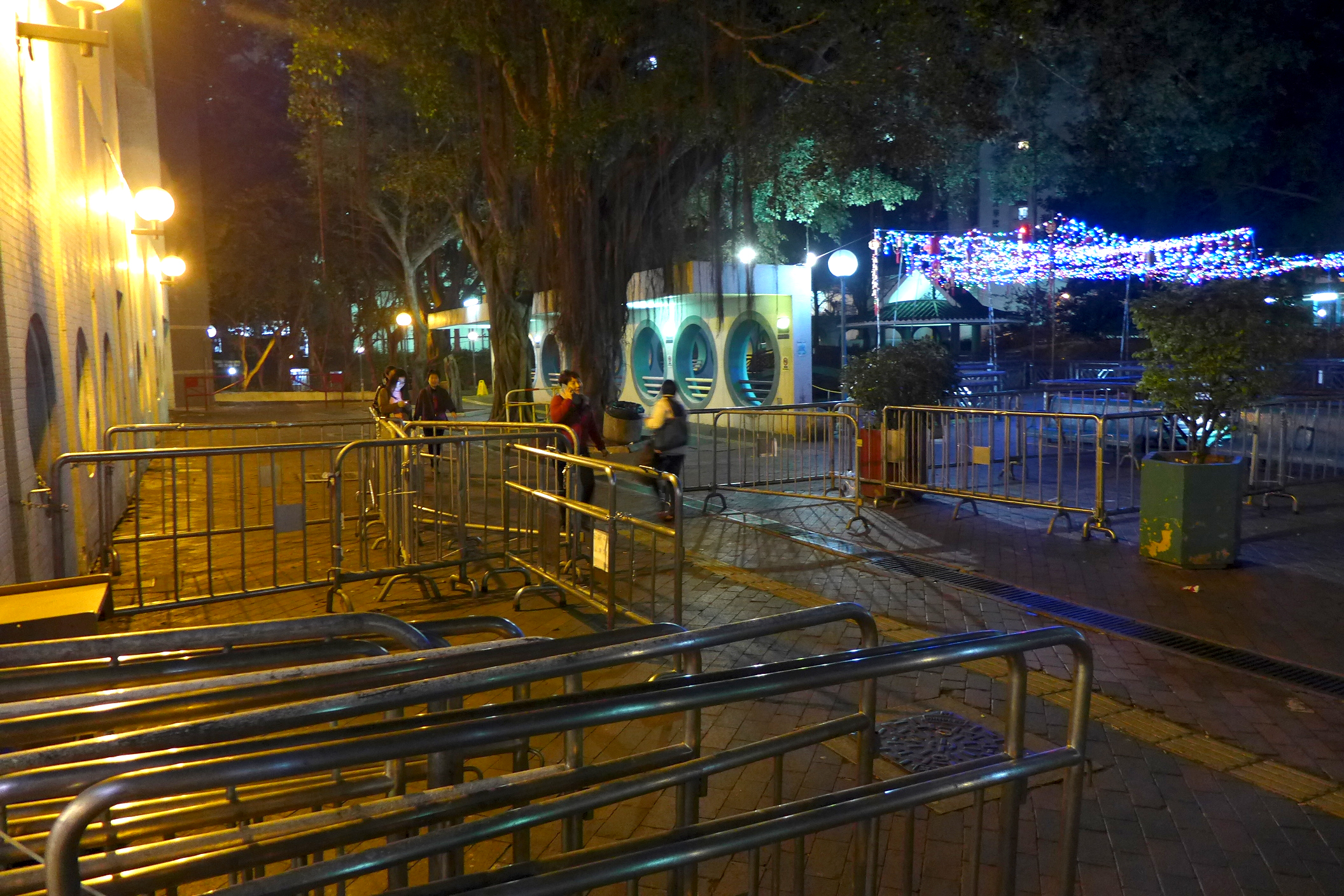
Barriers set up by management at Leung King Estate against hawkers

Uni-China (Market) Management also manages the market at Leung King Estate in Tuen Mun, which is also owned by The Link. In February 2016 a group of men dressed in dark jackets with "manager" (管理員) printed on the backs acted in an intimidating manner toward hawkers in the area of the shopping centre since 2 February. More than 200 showed up to protest against the men combating hawkers on the night of 8 February. Some minor clashes broke out between the self-proclaimed managers and the protesters, and required mediation by the police. Two protesters were arrested and one reporter was injured during the clash.

Conflicts between the management and the public reoccurred on the night of 9 February. The men were filmed beating up protesters while police stood by and prevented others from being involved. A reporter was also beaten up by the control team. A 31-year-old man was arrested for causing disorder in a public place. He allegedly interfered with a worker performing his duties at Leung King Estate. The Link REIT distanced itself from the clashes and denied the hawker control team was part of its staff.

=== Illegal wastewater discharges ===
In 2016 the Environmental Protection Department initiated prosecution against the Link REIT under the Water Pollution Control Ordinance because wastewater from the Mei Lam Shopping Centre, owned and managed by the Link, was being illegally discharged into the Shing Mun River. The company was fined $15,000 in November 2016 and ordered to rectify the situation immediately.

=== Bloodsucking landlord ===
Due to its history as monopoly landlord of community shopping malls, controversial business ethics and unfriendly treatment to neighbourhoods, small business owners and investors. The company is well known as a "bloodsucking landlord" as bipartisan parties has put it over the years for its unyielding fist on its tenants. According to Richard Harris's opinion, Link Reit has been widely considered a "corporate monster" in Hong Kong partly responsible for the city's socioeconomic issues.

=== Ill managed rodent issue during COVID-19 ===
In Aug 2020, dozens of rats were found crawling over fresh pork laid on the floor outside the vendor during the early hours in Link REIT's Sau Mau Ping wet market.

== Government response ==
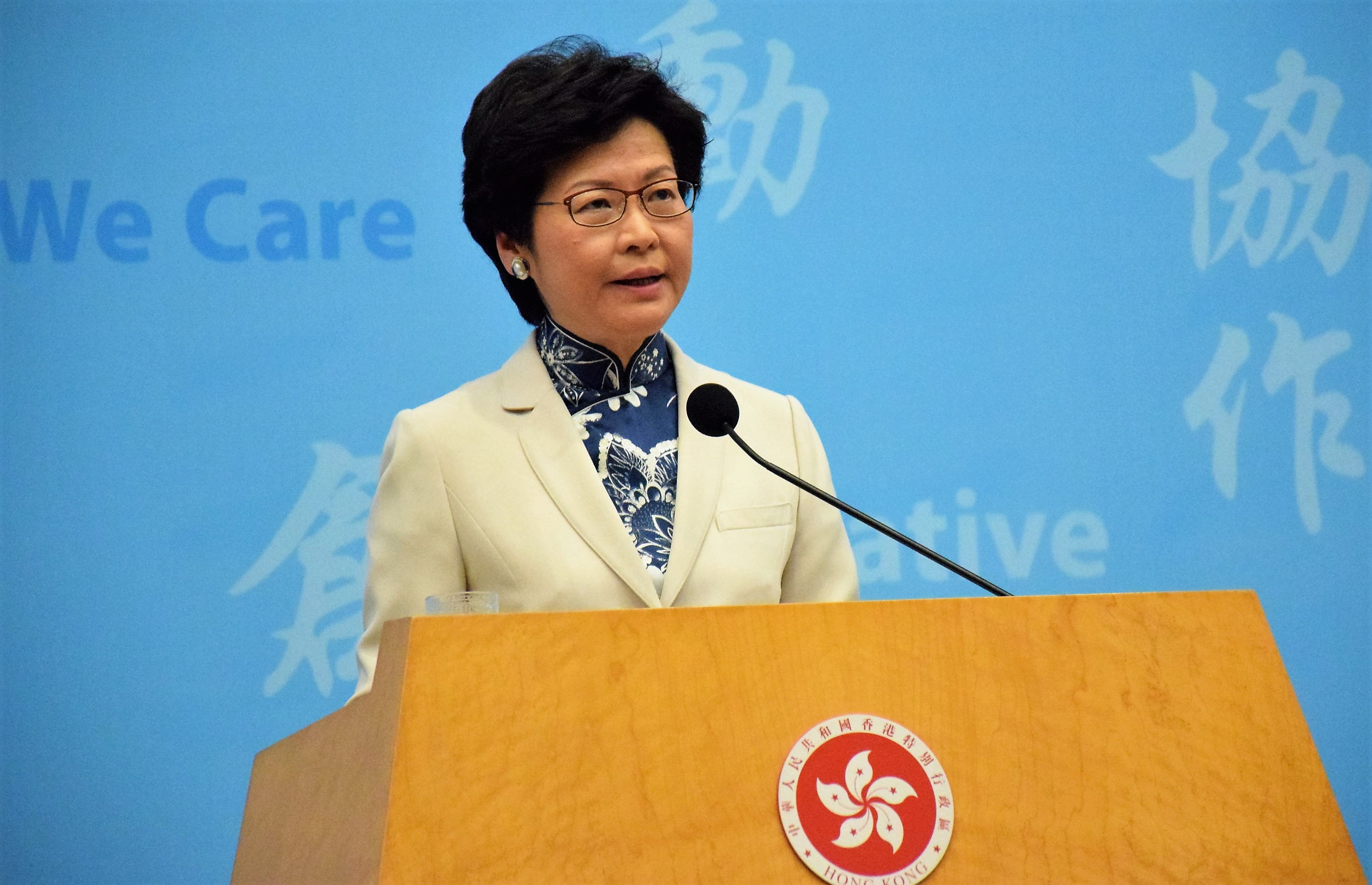
Carrie Lam, now chief executive, has called Link REIT one of the "three mountains" facing Hong Kong society

Link REIT has been widely condemned by officials on both sides of the political spectrum. Starry Lee, chairperson of the pro-Beijing DAB, reported that former chief executive Leung Chun-ying "strongly criticised" Link REIT in a meeting with the DAB. In an interview with the South China Morning Post, Leung questioned whether the remuneration structure for top management of Link REIT had led to the trust's behaviour. He said that, as the previous owner of the public housing commercial space, the Hong Kong government has a responsibility to public housing tenants "to satisfy their needs and if necessary to provide alternatives to Link REIT properties". He said that a Link REIT monopoly in public estates was not acceptable as elderly tenants could not be expected to carry their heavy shopping to and from other markets. He said there was no plan to buy back the Link, but the government could explore providing alternatives if the Link was not serving nearby residents.

Carrie Lam, ex-Hong Kong chief executive, was reported in 2016 to have called Link REIT one of the "three mountains" – i.e. one of the major sources of contention in Hong Kong society – that the government sought to conquer. Lam stated that the government should explore different avenues toward tackling the problem, including launching a potential legal battle against the company.

Similarly, in April 2019, legislator Alice Mak moved a motion in the Legislative Council urging the government to "overcome the 'three big mountains'" that she wrote had plagued the local community, one of which is Link REIT. Various other legislators moved motions to this amendment suggesting means of tackling the problem, including amending the Housing Ordinance to regulate rent increases; constructing more public markets and bazaars to diminish Link REIT's commercial monopoly in many areas, and provide residents with greater shopping choices; creating a dedicated team within the Lands Department to inspect Link REIT properties, and to conduct enforcement against violations of land lease conditions by the company; and buying back Link REIT properties and placing them back under government management.

== See also ==
- Privatisation
- Securitisation – see "government securitisation"
