= Rejuvenation of dai pai dong =

Overview article

Dai pai dong is a type of traditional food stall in Hong Kong. The casual, open-air stalls peaked in popularity in Hong Kong during the 1960s and 1970s. The literal meaning of dai pai dong in English is “big license stall”. Dai pai dong can be recognized by their green steel exteriors and serve affordable Cantonese specialties. During their heyday, the stalls served a social hubs where working people would gather to eat and talk. Starting in the 1980s, the government stopped issuing new licenses and began buying them back, citing hygiene concerns and noise and traffic complaints. As elderly dai pai dong owners sold their licenses back to the government or died without being able to transfer licenses to their descendants, most dai pai dong closed down and were replaced by different kinds of restaurants. Urban development has also had an impact on dai pai dong. There are only 25 dai pai dong left in Hong Kong according to the Food and Environmental Hygiene Department, which manages the licenses. Because of the desire to preserve the local food culture, it has been suggested that licenses should be issued again for new and existing dai pai dong owners.

== Background ==
Dai pai dong was popular among the working class due to its cheap price in the 1950s and it earned the nickname “poor people’s nightclub”.

The rise of hygiene and traffic congestion complaints forced the government to stop issuing dai pai dong in 1956. The licenses started to be sold on the black market, and the government had to institute limits on the ability to transfer them as well. The licensees could only transfer the licenses to their spouses upon their death. If the licensees did not have a spouse, the license would expire.

In 1975, with the opening of the first cooked food center, a lot of dai pai dong moved into these centers and markets. In 1983, the government began to buy back licenses from the holders to improve public hygiene. Since the licenses could not be transferred, many aged license holders chose to sell their licenses to the government. The number of dai pai dong in Hong Kong dropped significantly. There were 68 dai pai dong in Kowloon City prior to its demolition. There are currently only 25 dai pai dong remaining in Hong Kong: 11 in Sham Shui Po, 10 in Central, 3 in Wan Chai, and one in Tai O. Only a few of them are still on the streets in the traditional style.

Nevertheless, while the traditional food stalls representing Hong Kong food culture closed down one by one because of urban development, there are those who suggest preserving dai pai dong.

== Controversy ==
In 2005, the closure of several local food stalls, such as Man Yuen Noodles, has brought some to call for the preservation of local food culture, including dai pai dong.

=== Support for dai pai dong ===
Those in support to dai pai dong argue that preserving them will help promote tourism, protect local culture, and create job opportunities. Dai pai dong were enmeshed in the local community and relationships between owners and customers were close and friendly. Among those in support of dai pai dong are the current owners and concerned citizens. The owners want for the government to set standards for them to improve, instead of being forced to close.

=== Opposition ===
Those opposed to the continued operation of dai pai dong include the District Council, some members of the Hong Kong Legislative Council, and the Tourism Board. The primary concerns are related to the hygiene and safety of the operations. There are also concerns about dai pai dong blocking roads and leading to noise and safety problems for the nearby residents. The Tourism Board is also concerned that the existence of dai pai dong may lead to an image of Hong Kong being unclean.

== Changes ==
Since the late 2000s, changes have been made to dai pai dongs to allow them to operate in a different ways. These changes were aimed to help them to survive in Hong Kong.

=== Policies ===
In 2014, the Hong Kong government loosened control on licenses transfer. 9 dai pai dong licenses on the Hong Kong were transferred and the stalls are kept open. To coordinate the improvement in quality of dai pai dong, in 2009, the Food and Environmental Hygiene Department provided funds to those in Central. The funds were to improve the sewage disposal and gas systems. There are also now regular sanitation events to maintain cleanliness.

=== Operating indoor ===
A traditional dai pai dong is a large iron box painted green with foldable tables and chairs on the roadside during opening hours and no air-conditioning. Because of management issues, some dai pai dong have moved to Municipal Services Buildings, such as those in Tai Kwok Tsui.
