= Handicraft markets in Hong Kong =

Handicraft markets in Hong Kong provide a platform for artists and craftspeople to show or sell their original artistic works. They are growing in range and popularity, but remain restricted by the availability of venues.

== Venues ==
Handicraft markets in Hong Kong are usually held on weekends and holidays. They can be held in various places such as universities (such as the Afternoon Market in City University), malls (such as the weekend creative market in the APM mall), and industrial buildings such as the Wonder Market in Kwun Tong sheung wang industrial building.

To join a handicraft market, the host companies which provide the venue will call for applications a few months before the market starts. Each handicraft market will have a specific theme: for instance, markets for different seasons or markets for different age groups. The applicant needs to send the host some samples of their artistic works. with a brief introduction. After the selection, the host will invite those who display a suitable style related to their main theme and a need to attend the market, and the application will then succeed.

== Development and history ==
With the growth of the handicraft market in Hong Kong, many artists, instead of just having an online shop, are choosing to set up a real shop and take part in handicraft markets. With the increased demand for markets, websites have been set up to assemble information about major events and markets.

=== Online platforms ===
Online platforms have become an important tool to promote the handicraft market in Hong Kong. The following are some examples of online platforms:

- Hong Kong Handmade will offer a platform for handicrafts market both from overseas and local young people to sell their handicrafts. They would like to help the craftsmen in Hong Kong to perform their handicrafts to the public. They are willing to hold the handicrafts market and strengthen the connection between craftsmen and the handicrafts lovers. Realizing the high rent and the lack of platforms and bazaars as difficulties for handicraft artists, Hong Kong Handmade provide the platforms and hope to diversify this environment.
- The Jockey Club Creative Arts Centre (JCCAC) is a multi-disciplinary artists’ centre in Shek Kip Mei which was officially opened on 28 September 2008. The first handicrafts fair is held in 2012. JCCAC will hold a handicraft fair each quarter at weekends which is a platform for around a hundred people to exchange or sell their handicrafts.

== Challenges for the handicraft market ==
The development of the handicraft market is in its initial stages, it is not as mature as other places such as Taiwan. The handicraft market in Hong Kong faces three main challenges. One of these is the availability of sites for holding a handicraft market. In contrast to Taiwan, where handicraft markets may be held in parks, a handicraft market in Hong Kong may only be held in certain specified places, and only certain holders are permitted to apply to use these. Lastly, to attract sufficient sellers and buyers to attend the handicraft market may also be a challenge, as the handicraft market in Hong Kong is not as well developed as in certain other places.

== Events ==
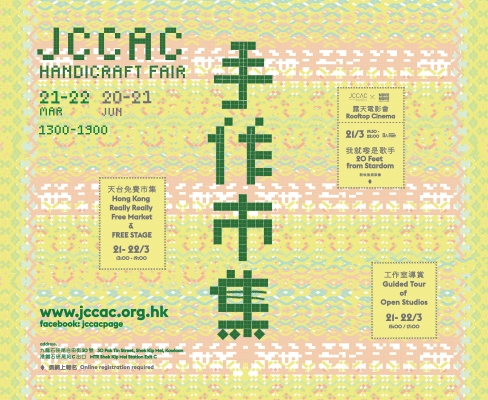

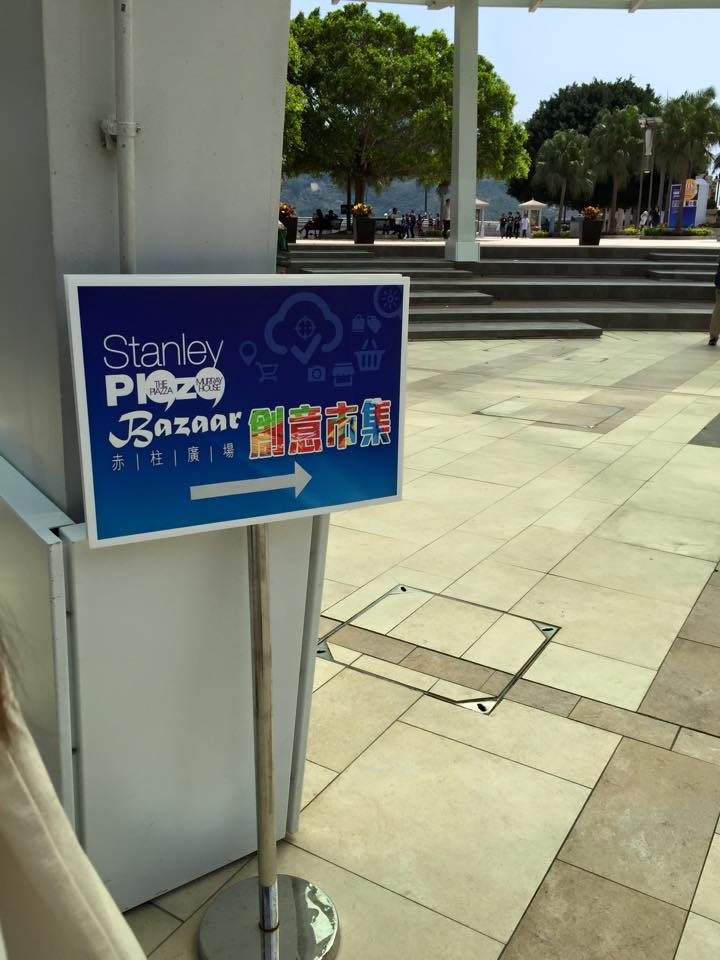
A road sign to Stanley market in Stanley plaza

- Clockencraft is a handicraft market within the Hong Kong Music and Art Festival. It is held together with the "Clockenflap" event once a year in the Hong Kong West Kowloon Cultural Districts.
- The Jockey Club Creative Arts Centre holds a handicraft fair in March. In 2015, it received over 700 applications for the handicraft fair, indicating increasing popularity. However, it only provides a quota of hundred craftsmen to engage in this event due to the space limits.
- A handicrafts market takes place in Stanley Market every Saturday and Sunday, in the Murray house.
