= Sham Shui Po Night Market =

Temporary night market in Sham Shui Po, Hong Kong

Sham Shui Po Night Market, also known as Kweilin Night Market, refers to the temporary night market in Sham Shui Po, Hong Kong. It emerged during the Chinese New Year holiday in recent years and it is operated by hawkers who sell local street foods such as egg waffles, curry fish balls, steam vermicelli rolls and stinky tofu to festival goers. Since these hawkers are unlicensed, Sham Shui Po Night Market is considered illegal and therefore not tolerated by government authorities despite backlash from the supporting public. There is ongoing controversy over whether Sham Shui Po Night Market should be allowed to continue its operation or not.

== Characteristics ==
The Sham Shui Po night market is only operated for a short period of time during the lunar year, which lasts for around a week. During that week, many restaurants and tuck shops would close for a couple of days so as to celebrate the Chinese New Year. Therefore, this night market is a rare place for people to eat and drink at night.

The night market sells many traditional local foods. There are numerous types of snacks for people to enjoy at a low price, such as curry fish ball, kabob, deep fried pig intestine, stinky tofu, etc. The most notable one is steamed vermicelli rolls, as the hawker would make it only after taking the order. The rolls are famous for their freshness while served hot and steamy. At their best a hawker could sell one hundred steamed vermicelli rolls in an hour, earning a considerable income of fifteen thousand dollars. Apart from the numerous types of local food, its operating style is also symbolic for the Sham Shui Po night market. Since hawkers there do not own a fixed-pitched hawker license, their business and the night market itself are illegal. Therefore, they would not stay in the same location for too long. They appeared in a ‘flash mob’ way in order to avoid being arrested by the Food and Environmental Hygiene Department. In addition, no seats are available for customers, forcing them to eat next to the hawkers’ stalls, leading to poor hygiene when compared to the usual restaurants.

== Controversies ==
Although Sham Shui Po Night Market is welcomed by some Hong Kong citizens, opposition exists. The main concerns of the critics are the noise and hygiene problems caused by the night market. Residents living in Sham Shui Po complain about the loud noises produced by the hawkers and customers in the night market, which affects their daily routine. For hygienic problems, Ms LAU Pui-yuk, district councilor of Nam Cheong Central, points out that hawking could lead to the widespread of diseases, especially during the winter influenza season. The source of food and materials processed by the hawkers are also questionable.

Moreover, the district councilors of the Democratic Alliance for Betterment of Hong Kong bring up how Sham Shui Po Night Market is manipulated by the underworld as the area covering Kweilin Street was daubed with the wordings like “reserved” last year during the Chinese New Year holiday. Vincent Cheng, district councilor of Nam Cheong North, opposes hawking and the operation of Sham Shui Po Night Market as using LPG and boiling oil on the street without following any safety guidelines could be very dangerous and even cause explosion, putting the well-being of citizens at risk. Despite the authorities’ ‘zero tolerance’ attitude towards the Sham Shui Po Night Market, supporting citizens view it in a completely different light. The League of Social Democrats held a campaign called “I want to be a hawker, I want to have fish balls (a kind of famous grassroot snack in Hong Kong)” on 19 February 2015 in order to support the hawkers who operate the night market. In the campaign, the vice president of the League of Social Democrats blamed the Chief Executive Leung Chun Ying for allowing developers to monopolize the market, suffocating the living space of the small vendors. Since developers own a lot of properties and aim to earn big money, many small vendors are forced out of shopping malls as they cannot afford the ever-increasing rent in order to make room for chained international brands. However, many small vendors find it difficult to rent new places as they either require high rents or are too remote from favourable districts. It is argued that hawking is the only way out for them to make a living, despite going against the law.

In recent years, more and more people are beginning to recognize importance of preserving Hong Kong characteristics, the phenomenon of flowing hawker being one of them. In the early days after Hong Kong was colonized, hawkers took a significant role in the local economy. The laborers could buy a bowl of curry fish balls, sweet soup or noodles from unlicensed hawkers after a hard day's work in a cheap, delicious and convenient manner. However, the government has been struggling to eliminate the existence of the pop up hawkers since the 1980s, appealing to its unhygienic and illegal nature. The flowing hawker is thus diminishing. Many people are now defending the Sham Shui Po Night Market so as to secure their collective memory and nostalgia for the old Hong Kong.
