= Curry fish ball =

Street food in Hong Kong

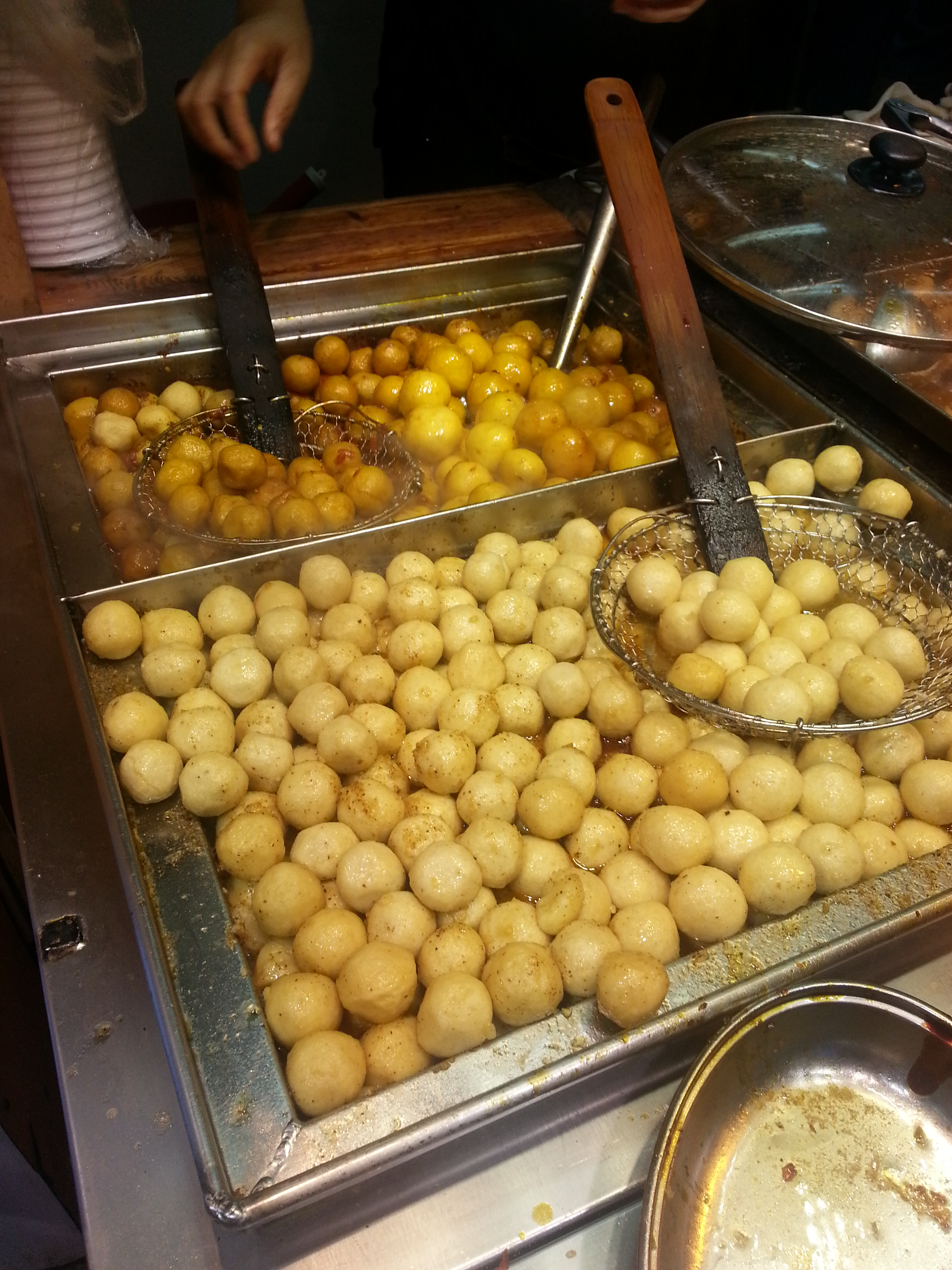
- Curry fish balls
- Place of origin: Hong Kong
- Serving temperature: Hot
- Main ingredients: Fish ball and curry sauce

A curry fish ball is a dish consisting of fish balls immersed in curry sauce. The dish is commonly seen in Hong Kong and an important part of Hong Kong street food culture. The dish originates from the 1950s. In addition, it is also served in cha chaan teng, school cafes and as a nostalgia dish for Hong Kong and Chinese diaspora worldwide.

== History ==
Fish balls first originated as a means for street hawkers to process lower-quality fish meat. The meat would be molded into a ball shape, then deep fried until a golden-yellow colour was seen. Curry was brought into Hong Kong by Indian settlers under British rule, and provided a convenient spice to compensate for the lack of freshness of the fish. In the high-density environment of the 1970s, selling curry fish balls as part of street hawking provided a convenient means of sustaining a family, and the cheapness of the food also contributed to its popularity.

Curry fish balls in street hawking began to decline as government cleanliness campaign began to crack down on street vendors. However, it was still a culturally important dish. Legal vendors in government-approved festivals, as well as traditional restaurants such as cha chaan teng or school cafeterias, continued selling curry fish balls as a cheap snack. In areas with large amounts of Hong Kong diaspora, such as Toronto, curry fish balls are also sold as a nostalgia item.

Curry fish balls are traditionally presented on bamboo skewers or in paper bags. Nowadays, it is more common to use paper or plastic cups to contain the fish balls.

== In popular culture ==
Curry fish balls are an important cultural icon in Hong Kong. In 2013, a tourism ranking by Cheapflights.com ranked Hong Kong street food as the best in the world, citing curry fish balls as one of the determining factors. Curry fish balls are often used to represent Hong Kong food in international events and appear frequently in movies and TV shows set in Hong Kong.

Curry fish balls have also become a symbol of localism in Hong Kong. The 2016 Mong Kok civil unrest is also often referred to as the "fishball revolution" due to the civil unrest beginning with a campaign to chase away street hawkers in the Sai Yeung Choi Street night market, many of whom were selling curry fish balls.
