= Kam Wing Tai Fish Balls =

Hong Kong snack

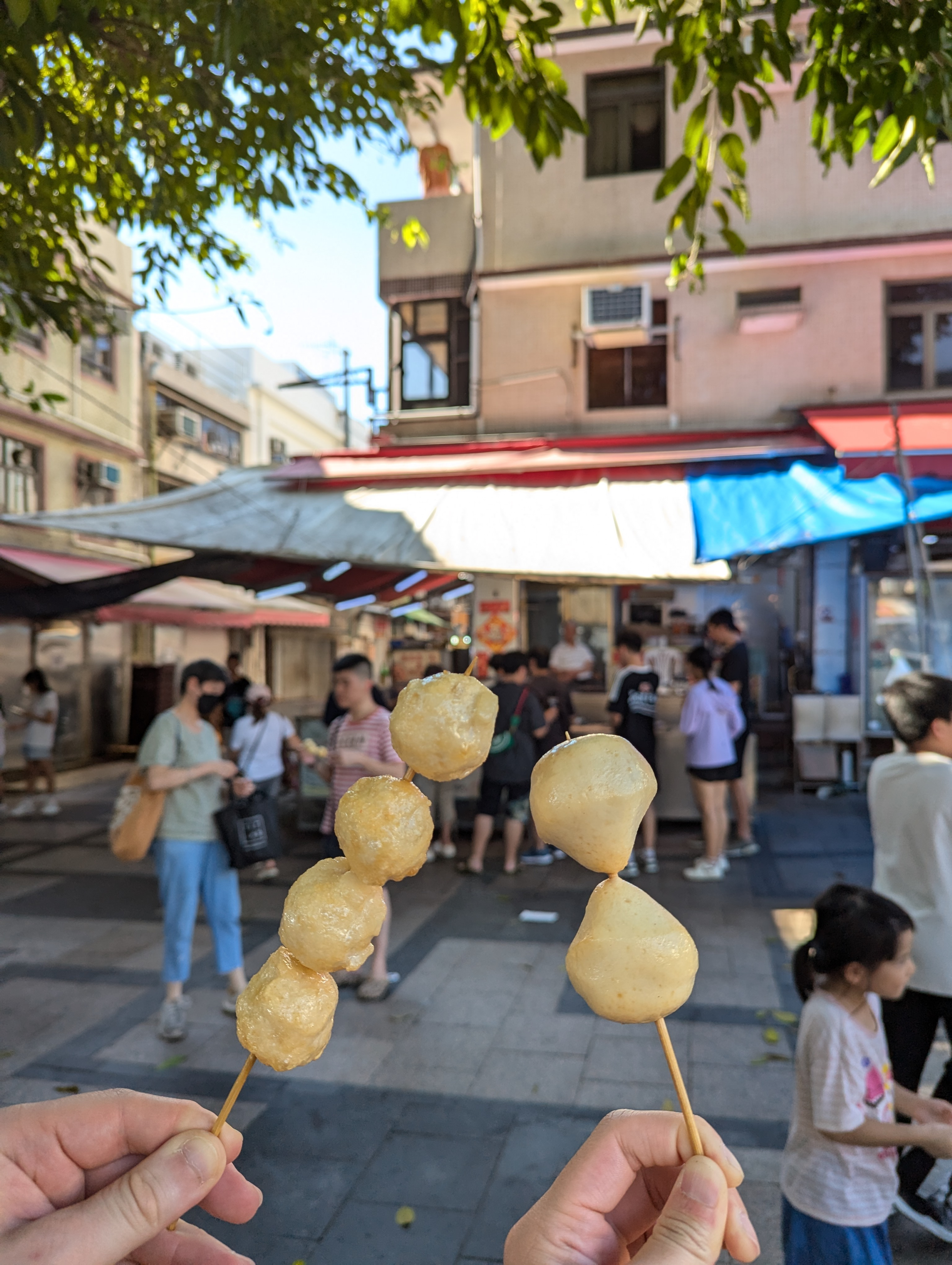
Cheung Chau fishballs outside the street food stall Kam Wing Tai

The Kam Wing Tai Fish Balls (sometimes Cheung Chau fishball; Chinese: 長州魚蛋) is a fishball street snack formerly sold in stalls in Cheung Chau, Hong Kong. Known for its large size and soft chewy texture, the food is often presented on wooden skewers in pieces of two. As with other fishballs served in Hong Kong, they may be seasoned with a variety of sauces, including curry sauce and mala sauce. The fishballs are usually made out of fish paste, a cheap ingredient extracted from grey mullets.

The fish balls were approximately the size of a golf ball, which is larger than those in most Hong Kong fish ball dishes. They are served steamed or deep fried. As of 15th August 2024 the fishballs are no longer produced due to the closure of Kam Wing Tai.

== History ==
On 4 August 2024 the proprietor of Kam Wing Tai, the business who invented the fishballs, announced the closure of his business effective 15 August 2024 after 40 years of producing the snack.

== See also ==
- Cuisine of Hong Kong
- Fish ball
- Hong Kong street food
