= Mee pok =

Chinese noodle dish

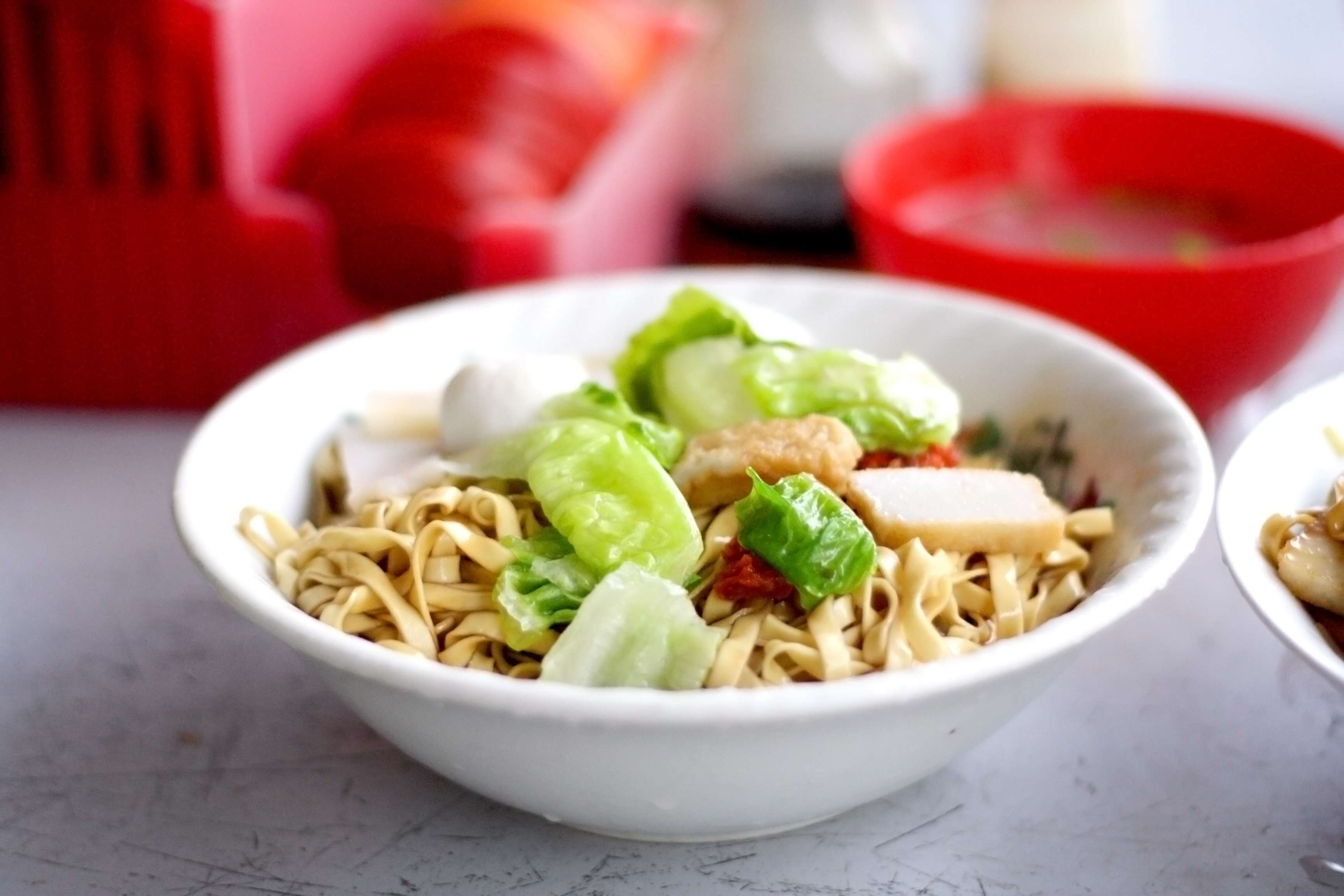
- Mee pok served "dry" with fish balls
- Type: Noodle

Mee pok
- Simplified Chinese: 面薄
- Traditional Chinese: 麵薄
Transcriptions
Standard Mandarin
- Hanyu Pinyin: miàn báo
Southern Min
- Hokkien POJ: mī-po̍h
- Teochew Peng'im: mi7boh8

Mee pok is a Chinese noodle characterized by its flat and yellow appearance, varying in thickness and width. The dish is of Chaoshan origin and is commonly served in the Chaoshan region of China and countries with a significant Chaoshan Chinese immigrant population such as Singapore, Malaysia and Thailand. Mee pok is commonly served tossed in a sauce (often referred to as "dry", or tah in Hokkien (Pe̍h-ōe-jī: ta)), though sometimes served in a soup (where it is referred to as "soup", or terng). Meat and vegetables are added on top.

Mee pok noodles are fresh noodles made from wheat flour, egg and lye water.

Mee pok can be categorised into two variants, fish ball mee pok (yu wan mee pok), and mushroom minced meat mee pok (bak chor mee). Bak chor mee is usually prepared using thin noodles ("mee kia") (widely known as wonton-style noodles or youmian) or mee pok, while yu wan mee can also be prepared in both styles or other noodle varieties.

Mee pok is a staple commonly offered in hawker centres and coffee shops (kopitiams in parts of Southeast Asia) in Singapore, together with other Chinese noodle dishes.

== Mee pok sauce ==
The sauce in which the noodles are tossed is considered a representation of the cook's skill and experience.

The sauce consists of four components: chili, oil, vinegar and other condiments such as soy sauce and black pepper. The chili is made from various ingredients and its preparation often includes frying and blending. Oil, traditionally lard, ensures a smooth texture in the noodles, though vegetable oil is sometimes used as a healthier substitute. Vinegar is added during preparation, and diners can add more at the table to taste.

Versions served to children sometimes replace chili sauce with tomato ketchup.

== Soup ==
Soup is served in a bowl as a side dish accompanying the "dry" variant, or served together with the noodles for the "soup" version where the sauce is omitted. Traditionally, the soup is boiled and simmered overnight with old hen, pork bones, dried sole fish, and soybean. The resulting broth is rich in taste and cloudy in appearance.

== Mee pok noodles ==
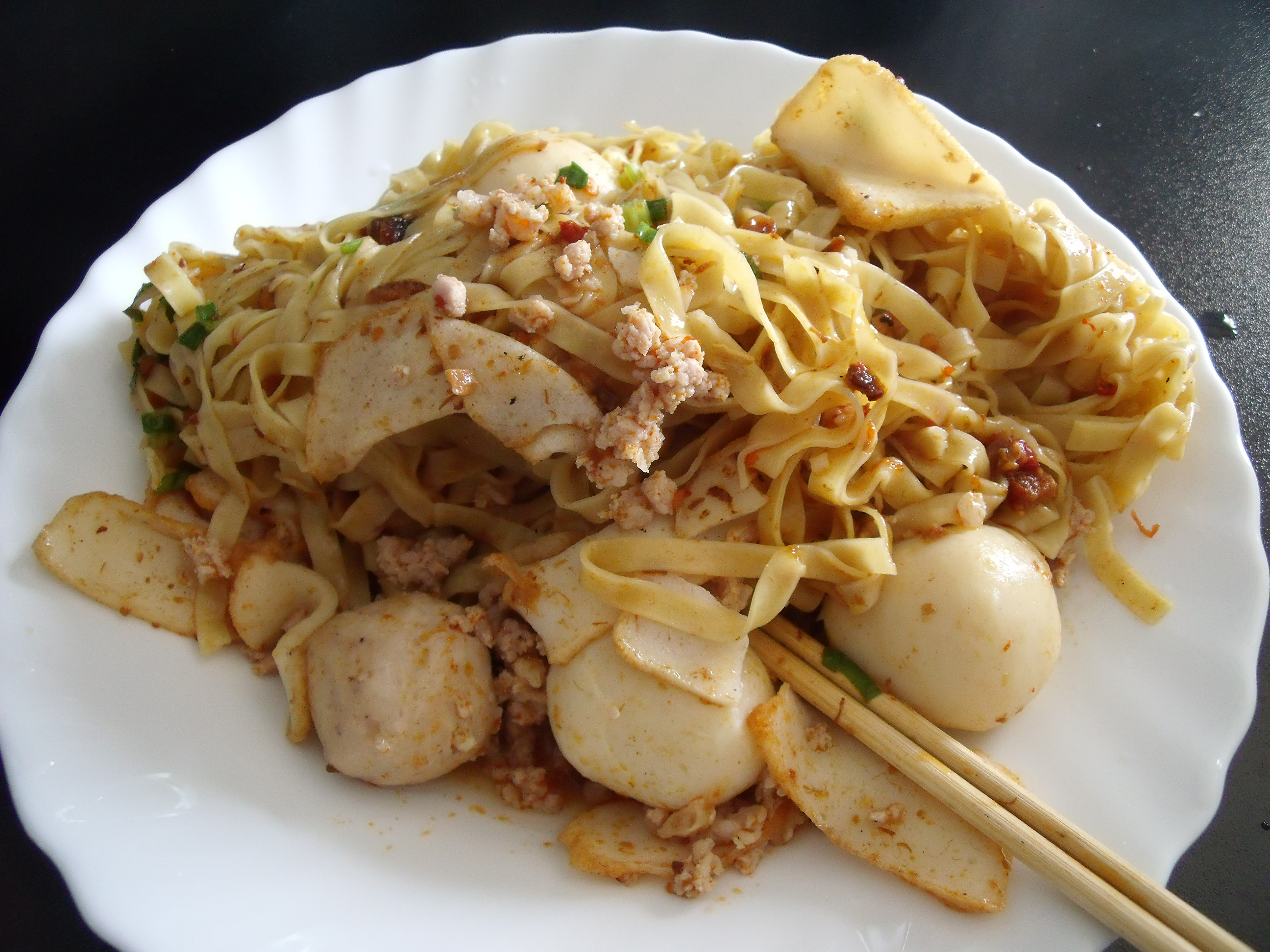
Mee pok noodles sold in Bukit Batok, Singapore

Usually, the noodles are factory-made, and require substantial preparation before cooking. Different hawkers prepare and cook their noodles differently, but the desired outcome is the same: springy al dente noodles.

Hawkers often toss the noodles vigorously to remove excess flour and soda and to separate noodles which have stuck together. Other processes include stretching the noodles, cutting into a desired length, and separating into serving portions.

The cooking process of the noodles consists of blanching in hot and cold water multiple times, though some hawkers omit the cold water. The noodles are drained and placed in either sauce or broth.

== Bak chor mee ==
Bak chor mee (simplified Chinese: 肉脞面; traditional Chinese: 肉脞麵; pinyin: ròucuǒ miàn; Pe̍h-ōe-jī: bah-chhò-mī; Teochew: neg8 co3 mi7; Southern Min: bak chor mee), which translates to minced meat noodles, is a Singaporean noodle dish popularly sold as street food in hawker centers and food courts. The noodles are tossed in vinegar, minced meat, pork slices, pork liver, stewed sliced mushrooms, meat balls and bits of deep-fried lard. Bak chor mee can be categorised into two variants: a dry version and a soup version. Most dry versions come with slices of stewed mushroom, minced pork, slices of lean pork and sometimes fried ikan bilis, atop noodles tossed in a punchy chilli-vinegar sauce, while soup versions are lauded for the depth of pork flavour in its broth. Singapore's bak chor mee was listed as the top world street food by World Street Food Congress.

== Fish ball mee pok ==
This version of mee pok is usually served with toppings of fish balls, sliced fish cakes, geow (a type of small dumpling made with fish meat paste wrapping a small bit of minced meat), minced meat, meat balls, lettuce or taugeh (beansprouts in Hokkien). It can be made with the addition or omission of any of the toppings, prepared in soup or "dry" style, and either with or without the chili sauce. Stalls that serve bak chor mee often also sell this fish ball variation.

== Other types of toppings ==
Newer varieties of toppings include deep-fried dumplings, abalone slices, imitation crab stick, and other processed fish products.

== In popular culture ==
- Mee Pok Man is the title of a film directed by Eric Khoo, a Singaporean film director.
- Bak chor mee featured prominently in an episode of The Mr Brown Show, which satirized the James Gomez saga during the 2006 Singapore general elections.

== See also ==
- Chinese noodles
