= Chongwen, Beijing =

Former district of Beijing, China

Coordinates: 39°53′27″N 116°24′47″E

Chongwen District 崇文区
- District of the People's Republic of China
- 1952–2010
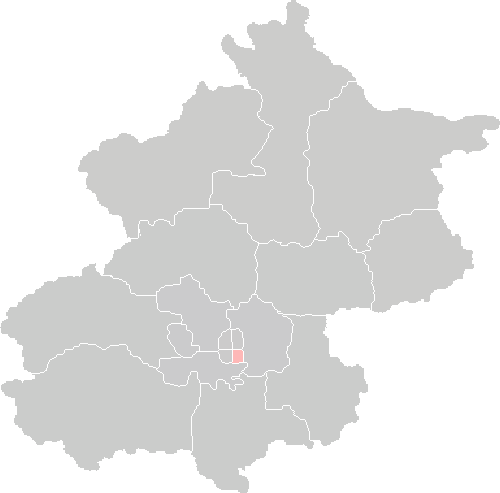
- Location of Chongwen on Beijing.
- History
  - Established: 1952
  - Disestablished: 2010
Succeeded by
Dongcheng District, Beijing
- Today part of: Part of the Dongcheng District

Chongwen District (Chinese: 崇文区; pinyin: Chóngwén Qū) is a former district of Beijing, located southeast of the city center (Tiananmen), and was situated between Yongdingmen and Qianmen. The name of the district was based on Chongwenmen, a former city gate. It spanned an area of 16.46 square kilometres (6.36 mi^{2}). It bordered Dongcheng to the north, Fengtai to the south, Chaoyang to the east, and Xuanwu to the west. It merged into the Dongcheng District in July 2010.

Chongwen District was one of Beijing's more compact districts, with its geographic area being considerably less than other districts. Prior to its merger with Dongcheng District, it was the smallest of the four districts that composed the city center. The district was renowned for the Temple of Heaven and Longtan Park, as well as housing the two original Peking Duck restaurants, Quanjude and Bianyifang.
