= U.T.C.A. Popekinsky =

U.T.C.A. Popekinsky is an abbreviation for Unique Talented Creative Artist. It is also a pun on the words for "Peking Duck" in Russian (Утка по-пекински, utka po-pekinski). U.T.C.A is a project of modern Ukraine designer Aniri Kintevs, of Odesa, Ukraine. She was inspired by the Ukrainian Revolution of 2014 (also known as the Euromaidan Revolution or Revolution of Dignity).

Kintevs' duck is a Ukrainian duck named either The Duck or U.T.C.A. Popekinsky. It draws pictures in a technique called "duckography", where the duck uses watercolor or acrylic paint and composes with its beak, tail, or foot.

The duck's motto is: "If the duck can, you can too!".
