= Bianyifang =

Bianyifang (便宜坊)
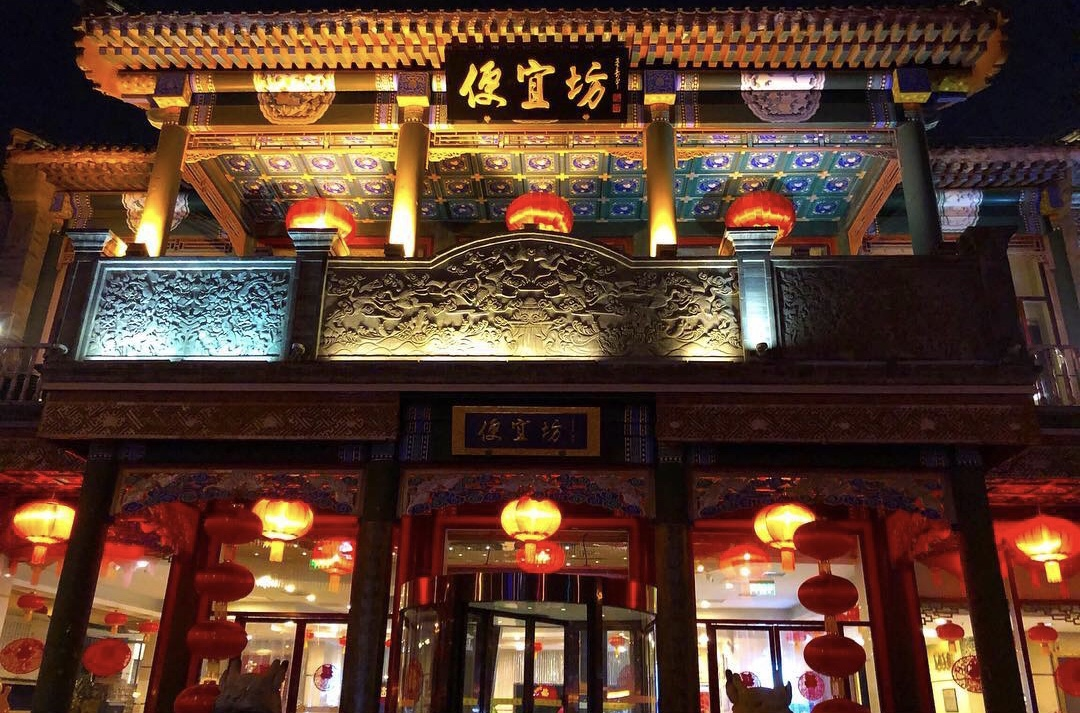

Restaurant information
- Established: 1416
- Food type: Peking duck
- Location: Beijing, China

Bianyifang (Chinese: 便宜坊; pinyin: Biànyífānɡ) is a restaurant in Beijing, China, known for its signature dish, Peking duck. The restaurant Bianyifang was established in 1416 during the Ming dynasty, but its name dates back to roughly 1552. Several other branches of the restaurant also operate in Beijing and across China, under Bianyifang Group. Bianyifang is one of the most popular restaurants in China and has been reported on by a range of media outlets.

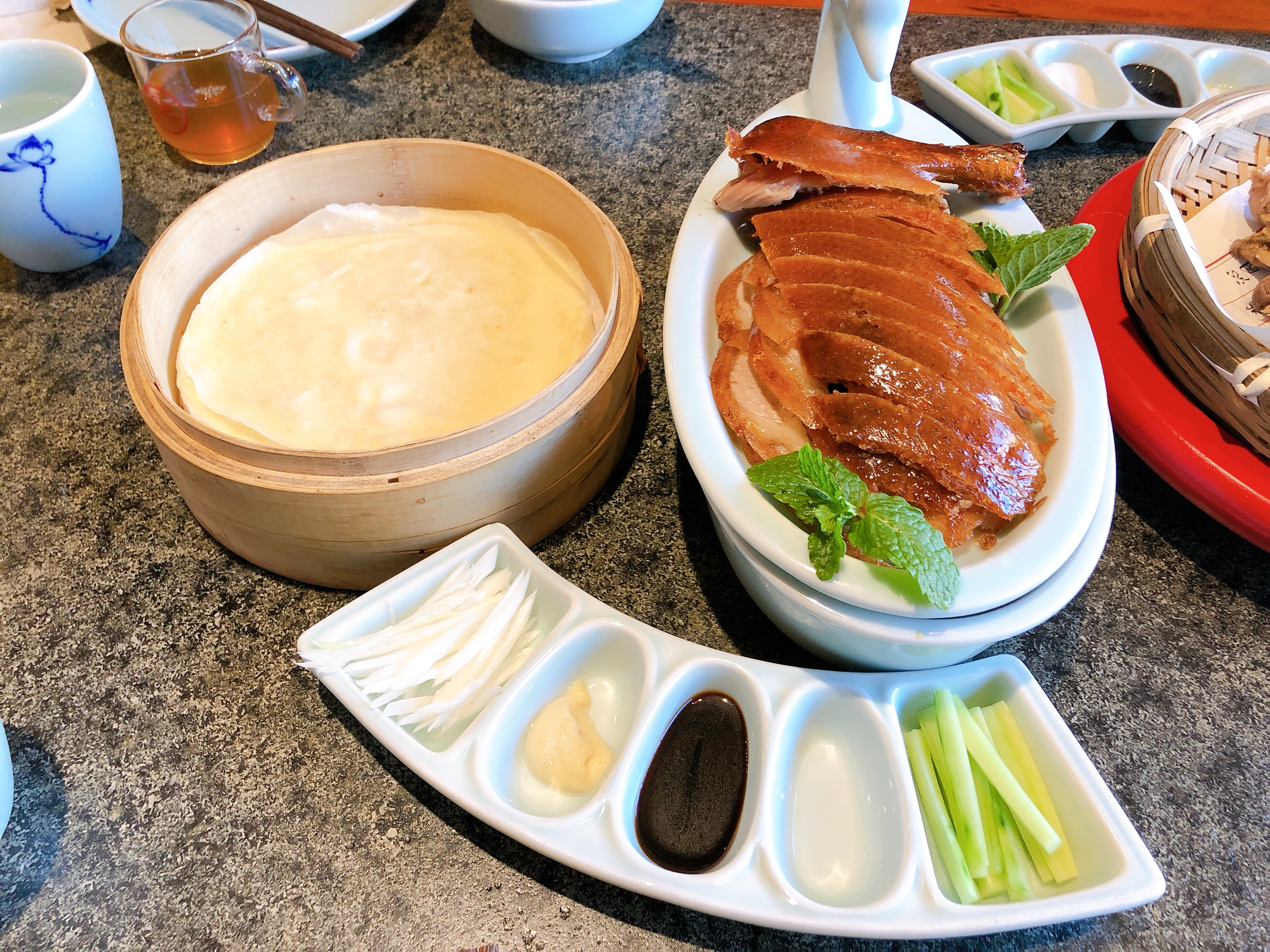
Sliced Peking duck served with traditional condiments at Bianyifang

== History ==
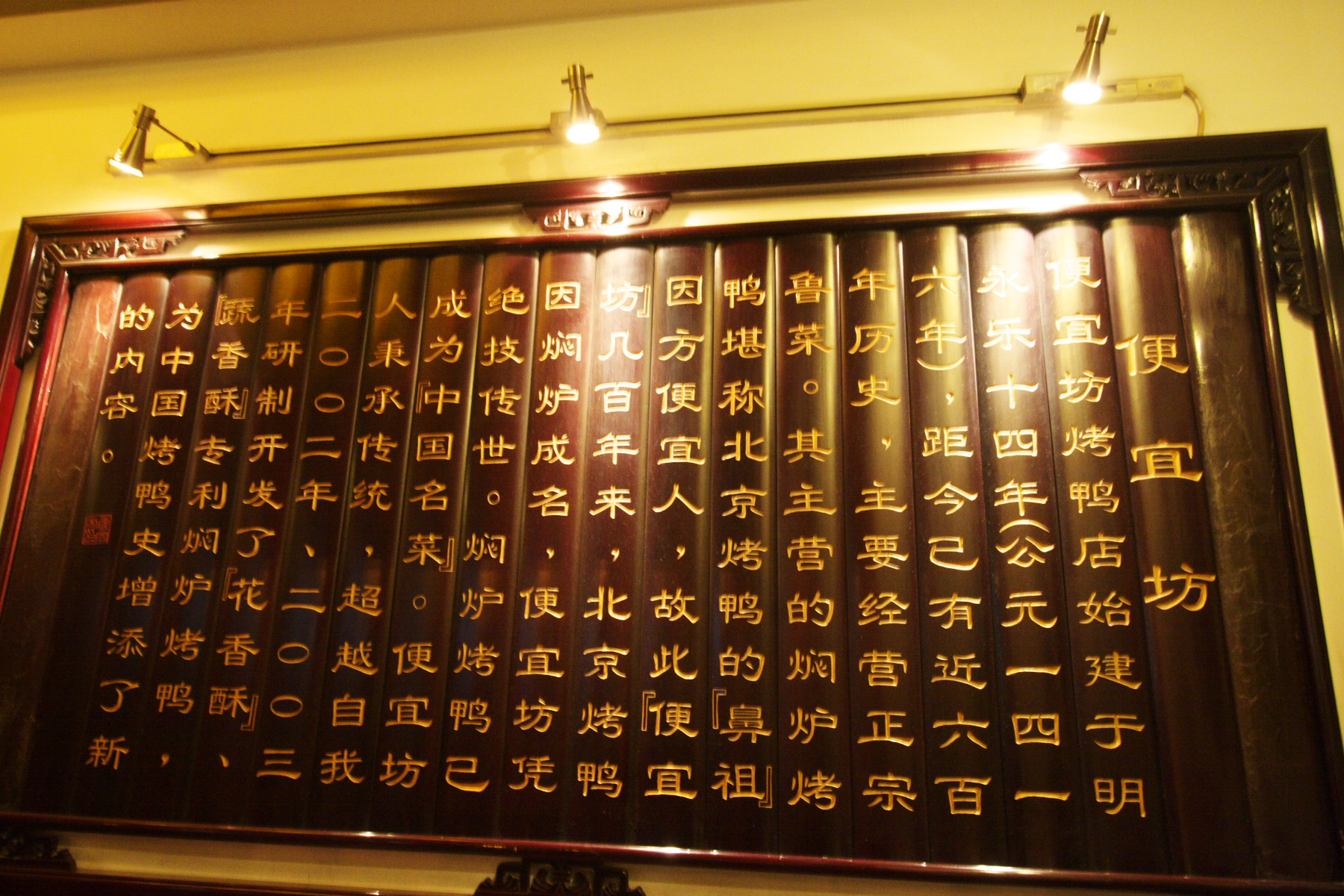
A board at Bianyifang recounting the restaurant's history

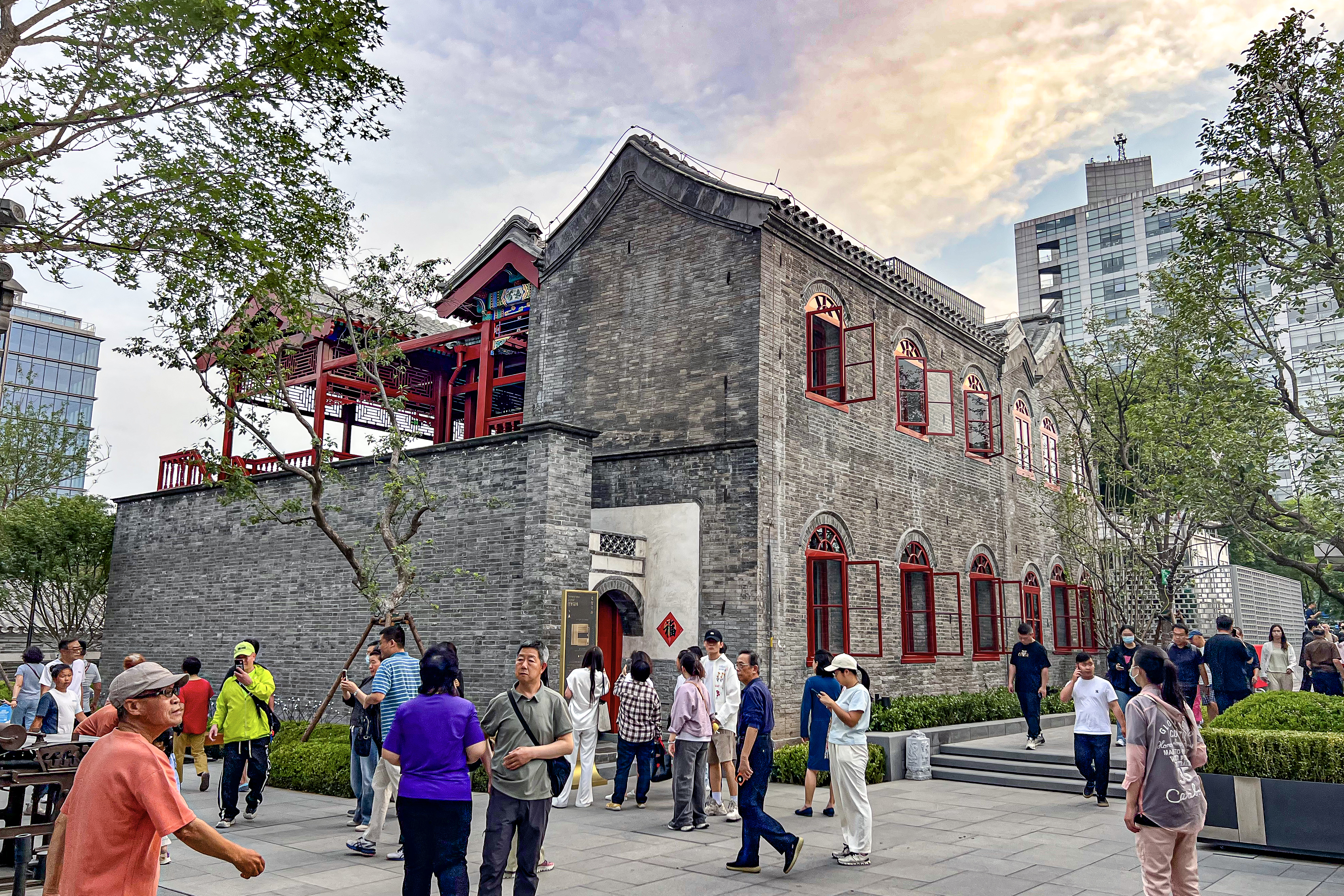
Site of the former Bianyifang at Caishikou

The original restaurant was established in Mishihutong, Caishikou, Beijing in 1416, the 14th year of the Ming dynasty's Yongle Emperor, and was initially a small workshop similar to a tavern that served primarily duck and chicken. The tavern was popular among locals, and the owner was known to be very friendly and hospitable to his customers, often conversing with them, listening to their stories, and providing them with advice.

The "Bianyifang" name is often credited to Yang Jisheng, vice minister of the Ministry of War, who lived at Dazhi bridge outside Xuanwu Gate. In 1552, Yan Song, the corrupt Senior Grand Secretary, sought to punish Yang Jisheng for trying to expose his corruption by framing him for crimes and tricking the Emperor into authorizing his execution. According to the story, Yang Jisheng, despondent and hungry after a failed attempt to appeal to the Emperor, came across the unassuming tavern and, liking its atmosphere, entered to order roast duck and vegetables with wine. When the customers and owner recognized him, the owner decided to converse with him and served him personally. Touched and impressed by the hospitable service, Yang Jisheng complimented the tavern's service and, asking for a signboard and bringing out his ink brush, wrote "fair price and considerate service" (便宜坊; "Bian Yi Fang") on it and gave it to the owner, who gladly displayed it above the front door, giving the tavern its name. Yang Jisheng and others from the Ministry of War became regular customers until he was executed in 1553. However, at that point Yan Song learned of Yang Jisheng's connection to the tavern and ordered the owner to remove the signboard, but the owner refused. Yan Song tried to forcefully remove the signboard, hiring thugs to intimidate and even viciously beat the owner into complying, but the owner resisted Yan Song to the point that he gave up and allowed the signboard to remain, cementing the tavern's name as Bianyifang.

By 1827, the owner of Bianyifang, Sun Zijiu, began to expand the restaurant and its menu, around which point Peking duck and Spanish and French-style duck liver became its signature dishes.

Due to the fame of the original Bianyifang, many restaurants named themselves "Bianyifang" in turn. The Xianyukou Bianyifang (鲜鱼口便宜坊) established in 1855 in Qianmen, Beijing by a family named Wang who hired a chef of the original Bianyifang, and still remains operational today.

== Branches ==
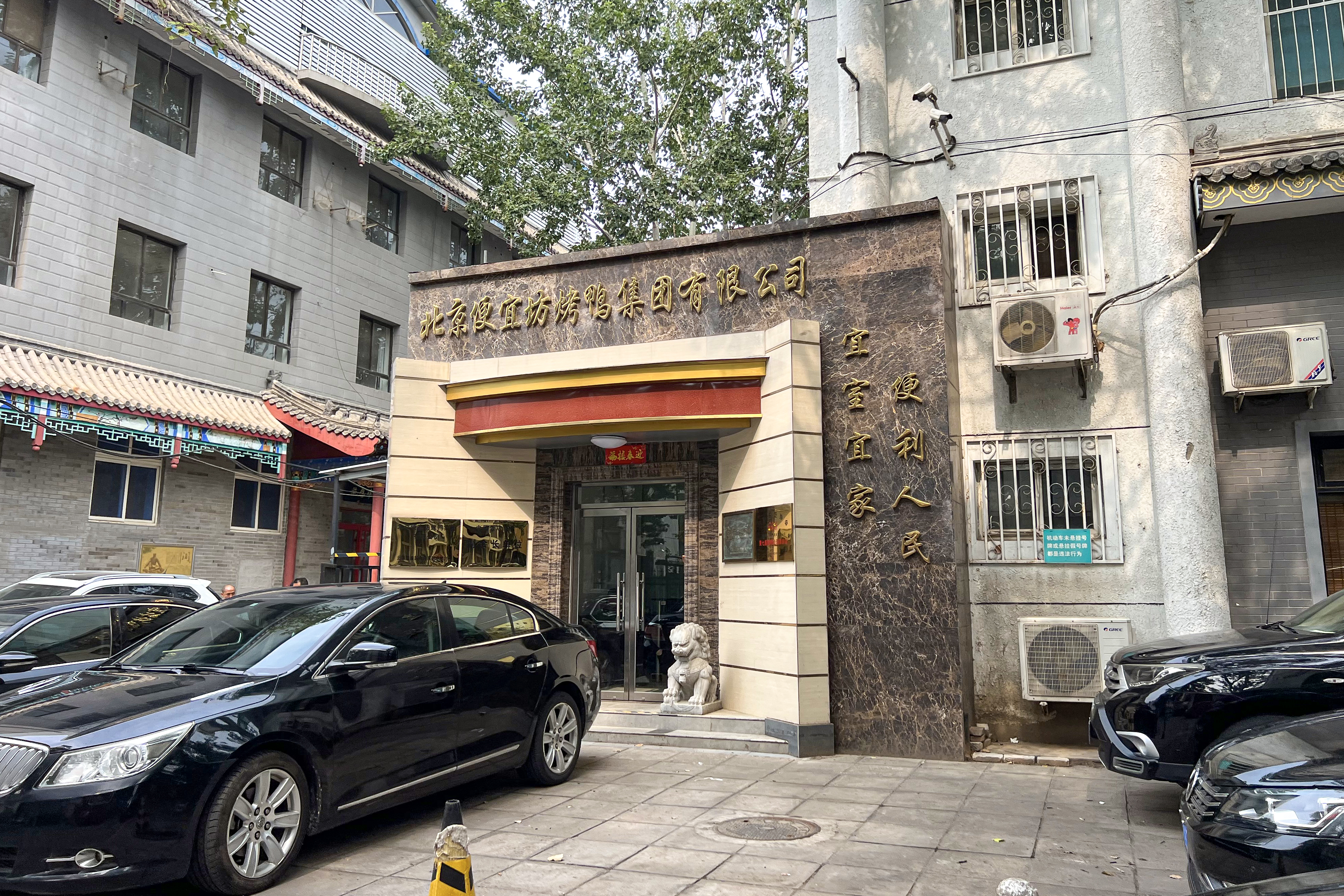
Headquarters of Bianyifang Group in Beijing

At present, Bianyifang has eight branch restaurants in Beijing: Hademen Branch, Yutingqiao Branch, Xingfu Street Branch, Anhua Branch, Hangtian Branch, New World Center Branch, Jianxiang Branch, Fufenglu Restaurant and Xianyukou Branch.

Outside Beijing are three more branches: Sanmenxia Branch in Henan Province, Hohhot Branch in Inner Mongolia, and Tangdu Branch in Shanxi Province.

== See also ==
- Chinese cuisine
- Dadong Roast Duck Restaurant
- Quanjude
