= Da Dong Roast Duck Restaurant =

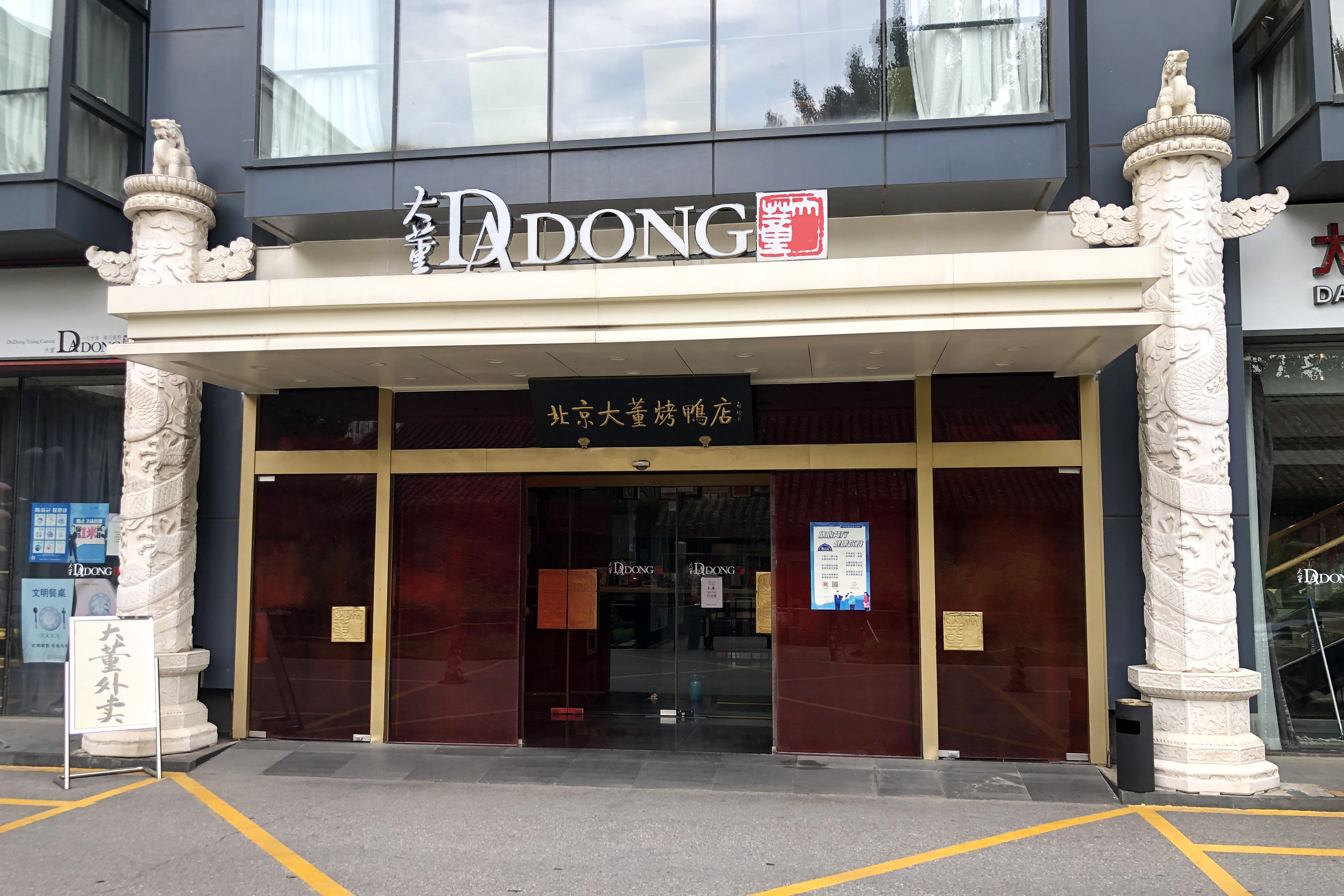
- Da Dong Roast Duck Restaurant at Zi Wei Park, Nanxincang, Dongcheng District, Beijing

Restaurant information
- Established: 1985
- Owner: Da Dong Group
- Food type: Peking Roast Duck
- Location: 1-2/F, Nanxincang International Plaza, 22A Dongsishitiao, Dongcheng District, Beijing, China
- Website: dadongdadong.com

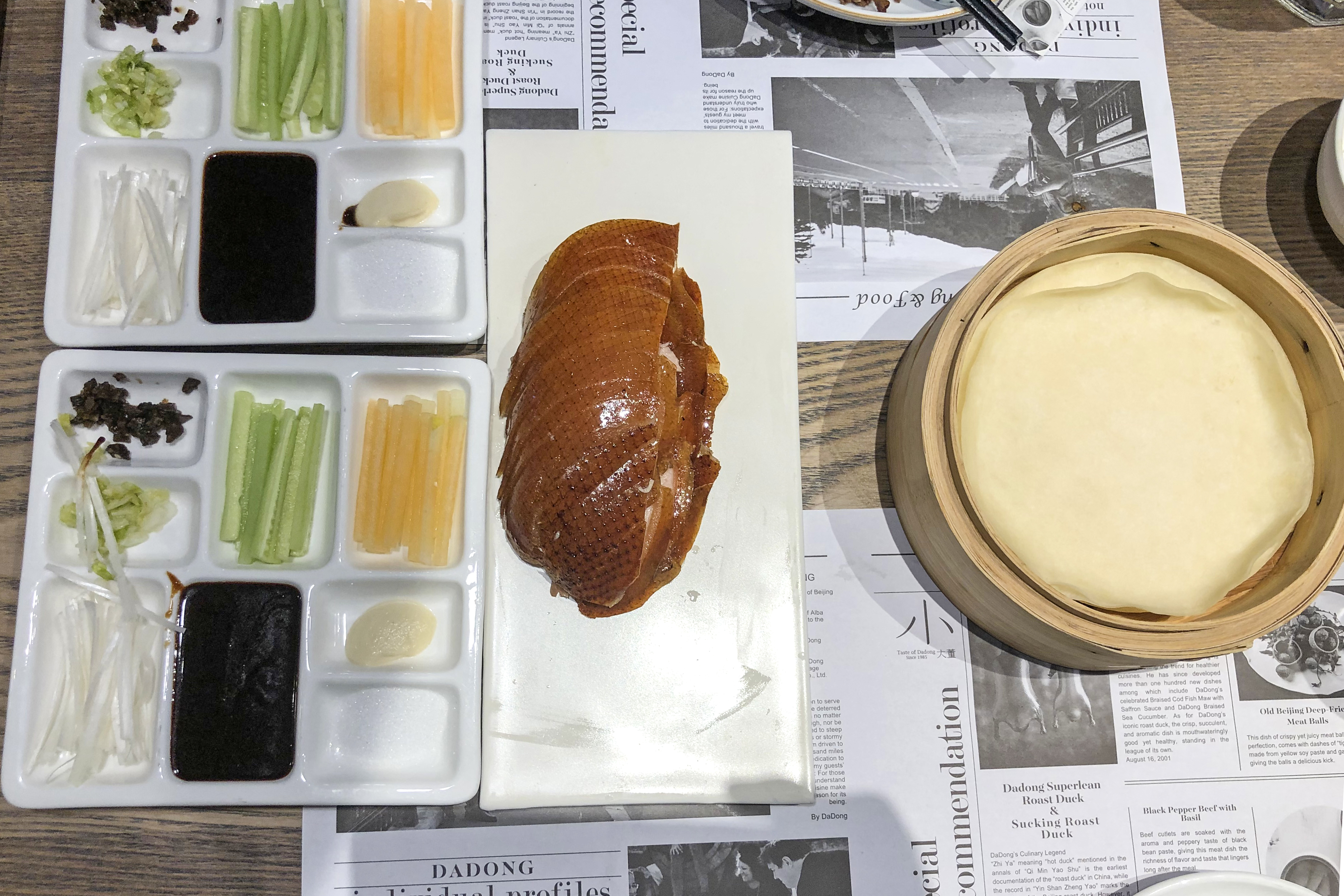
Da Dong's "Superlean" Peking duck

A landscape photograph of the interior of Da Dong Restaurant

Da Dong Roast Duck Restaurant (Chinese: 北京大董烤鸭店, Pinyin: Běijīng dà dǒng kǎoyā diàn) is a Chinese restaurant located in Dongcheng District, Beijing. The restaurant is named after its founder Dong Zhenxiang (董振祥), who bears the nickname "Dà (Big) Dong" (大董).

It is widely known for its Chinese cuisine, especially Peking duck. Da Dong has contributed towards innovating methods of cooking Peking duck by using a spherical wood fired oven instead of the more traditional method of a square oven, and the innovated roast duck is called "SuperLean" (酥不腻) Roast Duck. In 2014 the eatery was named the best Chinese cooking style restaurant in Beijing by The Beijinger.

Da Dong has been rated within the top ten best Peking duck serving restaurants in Beijing by various food critics. It was also listed as a suggestion for Bucket lists in the book 1,000 Places to See before you die by Patricia Schultz.

== Awards ==
- Beijing Restaurant of the Year (2014) – The Beijinger
- Travellers choice awards (2014) – TripAdvisor
- Food Award Winner (2011) – Time Out Beijing
- Top 10 Beijing restaurants (2015) – Gayot

Peking duck cooked by Da Dong prior to serving

== See also ==
- Bianyifang
- Quanjude
- List of restaurants in China
