= Quanjude =

Chinese restaurant chain that serves Peking duck

Quanjude 全聚德
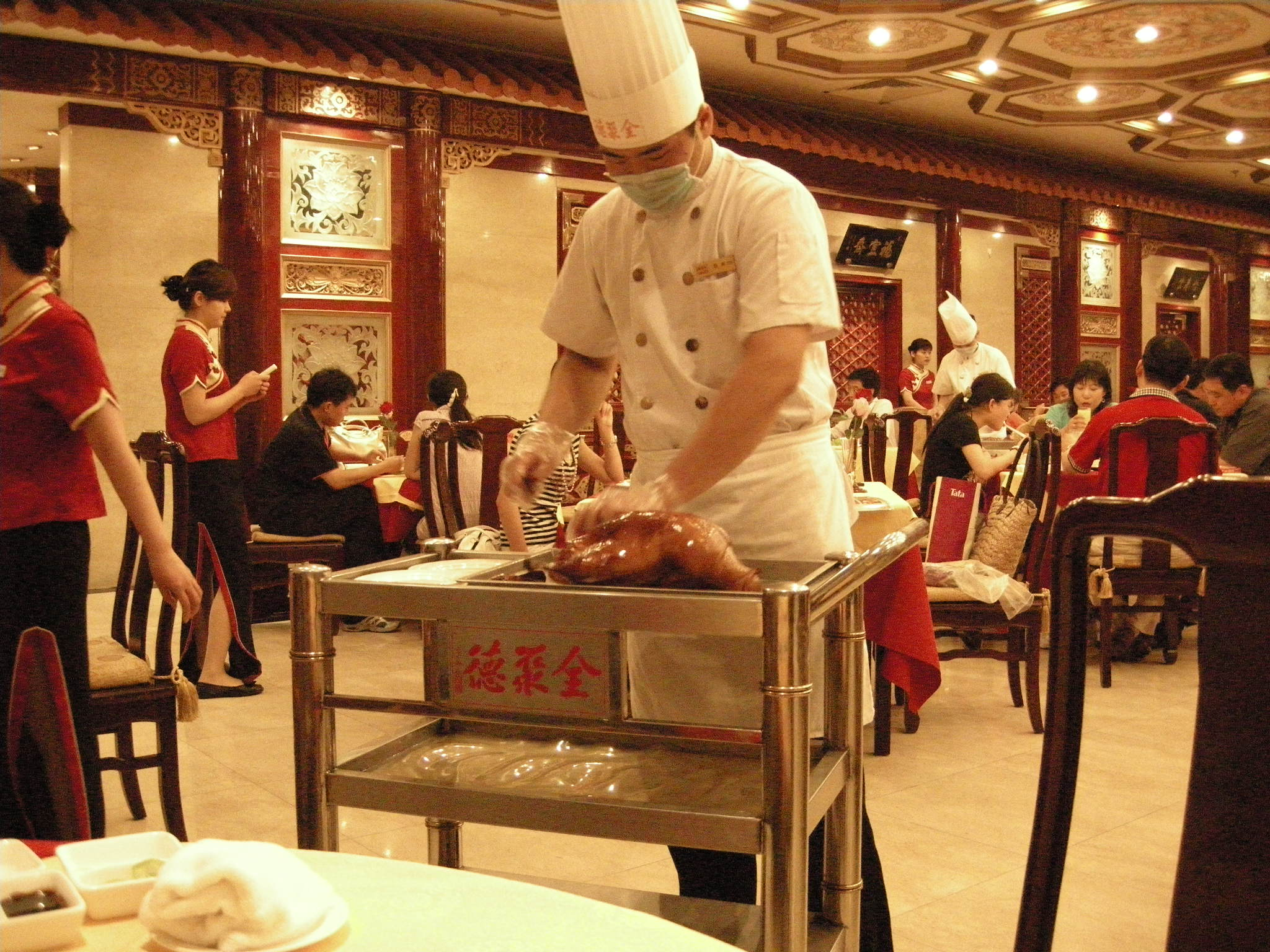
- Serving up a roast duck in Beijing, China

Restaurant information
- Established: 1864; 162 years ago
- Owners: Jiang Junxian, President of Quanjude Group Holding Company
- Food type: Peking duck
- Location: No.30, Qianmen Street, Beijing (main), Beijing, China
- Other locations: Branches and franchises in mainland China, Japan, Taiwan, Canada, United States, and Portugal
- Website: quanjude.com.cn

Quanjude (Chinese: 全聚德; pinyin: Quánjùdé, SZSE: 002186) (QJD) is a Chinese restaurant chain known for its Peking duck and its longstanding culinary heritage since its establishment in 1864 in Beijing, China.

== Company profile and branches ==
After a merger in 2004 with Beijing New Yansha Group, Quanjude is now a part of the Beijing Tourism Group, a state-owned enterprise.

The company's stock is listed on the Shanghai stock exchange.

=== In China ===
In 2010, there were 50 affiliates in China. The first directly run flagship store opened in Changchun, Jilin Province in January 2007.

==== Beijing ====
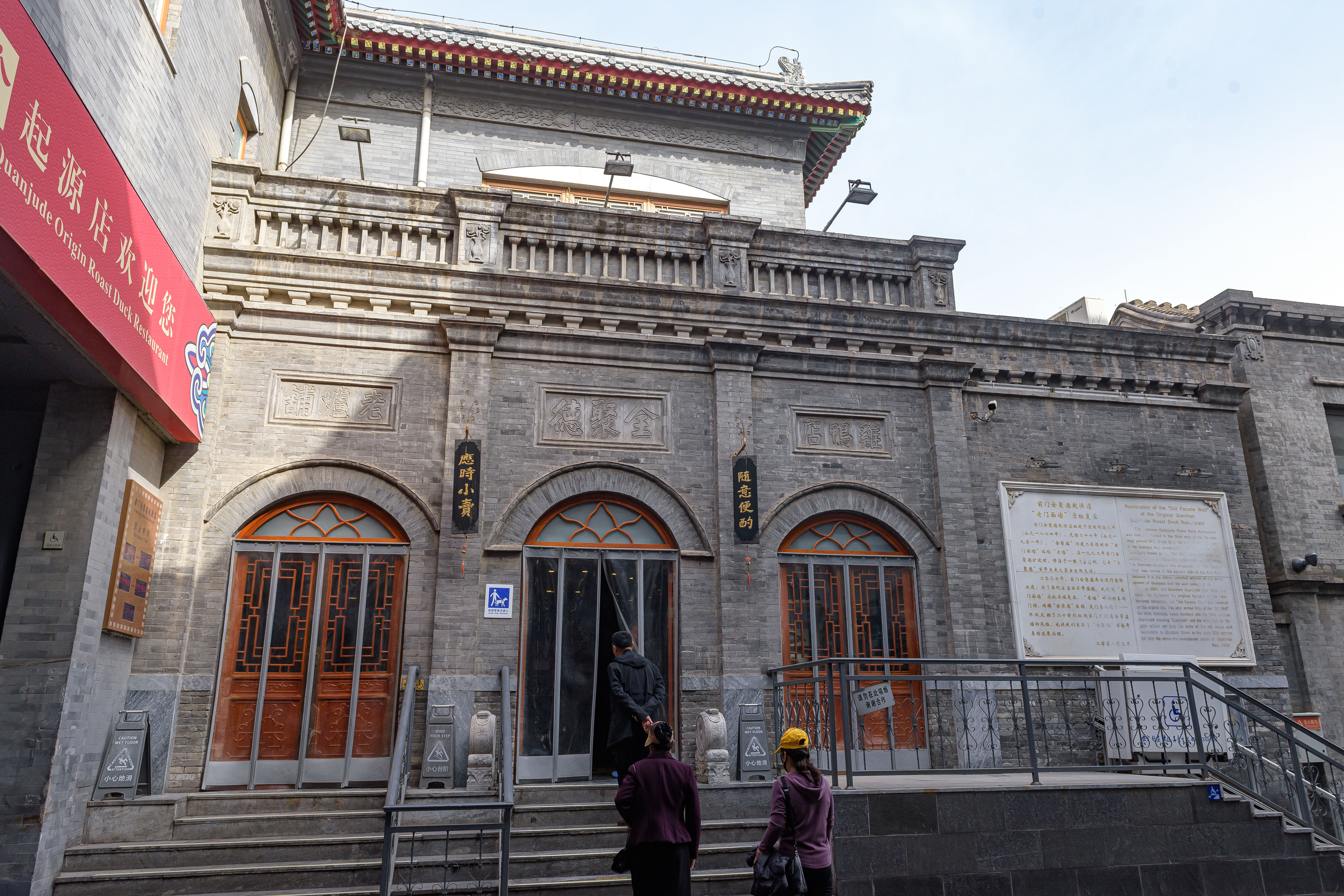
The original Quanjude restaurant building at the Qianmen street in Beijing

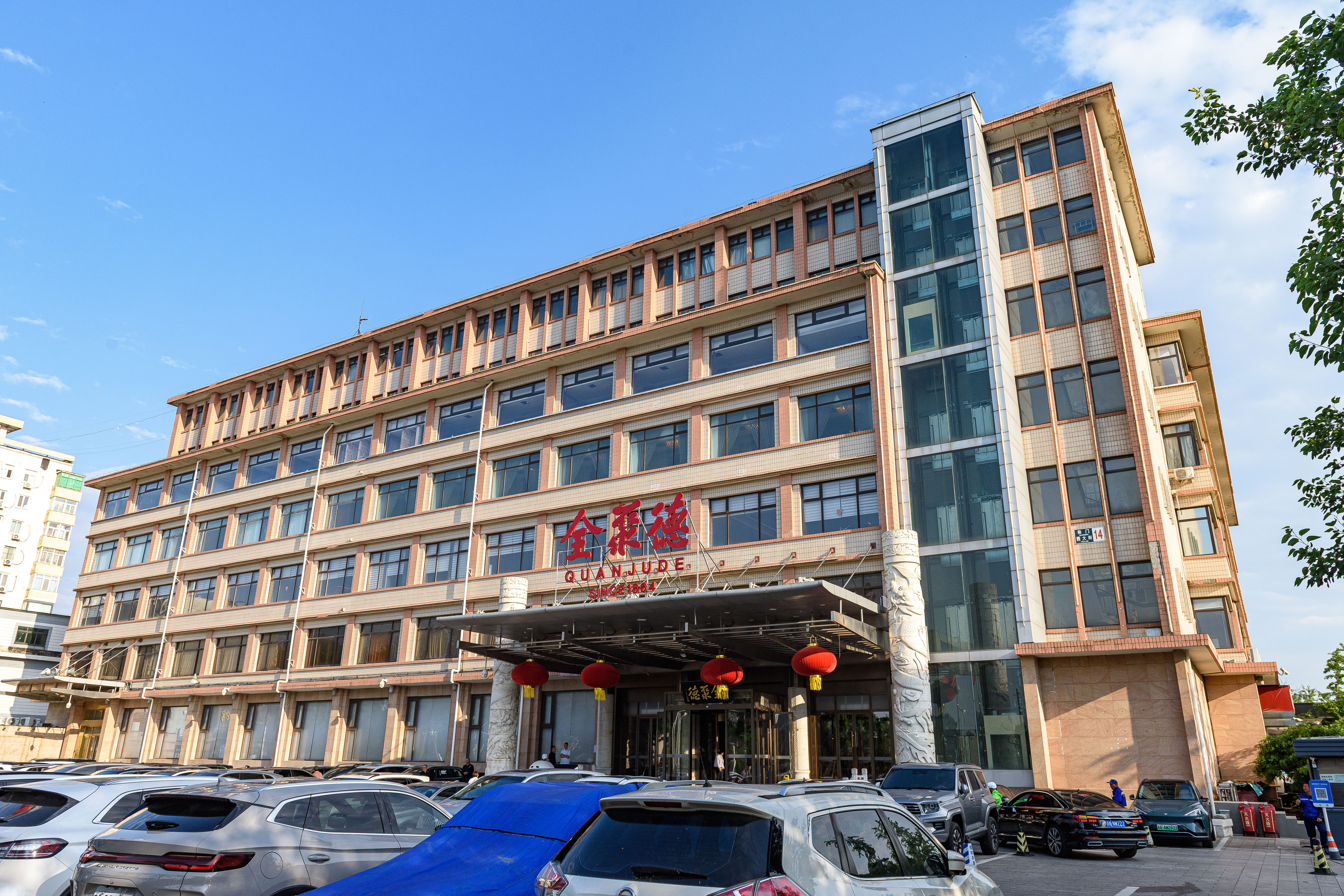
Hepingmen branch of Quanjude restaurant in Beijing, also the headquarters of Quanjude Group

Quanjude has eight direct branches in Beijing. The original location operates in Qianmen with several other branches in other locations in Beijing.

There is a seven-story restaurant on Hepingmen Ave., a location hand-picked by former Chinese Premier Zhou Enlai. Serving up to 5,000 meals a day, this restaurant covers a floor area of 15,000 square meters with over forty private dining rooms and can simultaneously seat 2,000 guests.

Having established a history and affiliation with the Chinese government at the municipal and central state level, Quanjude has often been used to hold state banquets and to receive celebrities, dignitaries, and important government figures from over 200 countries as distinguished VIP guests.

=== Outside China ===
The Quanjude restaurants outside China opened in Bremen, Los Angeles and Guam in 1994. In 2004, the first QJD restaurant in Japan (Japanese:Zenshutoku) opened in Tokyo.

In Canada, QJD operates restaurants in Toronto, Vancouver, and Ottawa; of note, the Vancouver restaurant received a Michelin Star in 2022, and the Ottawa restaurant is simply called "Peking Duck" for unknown reasons.

QJD also operates a restaurant in Lisbon, Portugal.

In June 2025, a new location, also called iDen & Quanjude, opened in Midtown Manhattan, New York, in the old Le Grenouille location. The restaurant space was bought for $14.2 million and was opened by the same people who own the Vancouver Michelin-starred location.

== History ==
Quanjude was established in 1864 during the Qing dynasty under the reign of the Tongzhi Emperor. Although Peking duck can trace its history many centuries back, Quanjude's heritage of roast duck preparation – using open ovens and non-smoky hardwood fuel such as Chinese date, peach, or pear to add a subtle fruity flavor with a golden crisp to the skin – was originally reserved for the imperial families.

The first Quanjude manager, Yang Renquan, who started out selling chicken and ducks, paid a retired chef from the palace for the imperial recipe. Soon after, Quanjude began to serve roast duck from the imperial kitchen to the common masses. Yang Renquan opened his first, small Dejuquan (德聚全, the three characters being reversed from the current name) inside Yangrou Hutong in Qianmen (前門), which at the time was one of the busiest areas in Beijing. His restaurant became an instant success and has since grown into the current branch in Qianmen that employs over 400 staff members and can occupy 900 guests at one time. The Qianmen restaurant, along with the many other Quanjude branches, together form one of the largest food enterprises in the nation.

After the 1949 establishment of the People's Republic of China, Quanjude was gradually collectivized.

== See also ==
- Bianyifang
- Da Dong Roast Duck Restaurant
