= Zhengyangmen =

City gate in Beijing, China

Coordinates: 39°53′57.0″N 116°23′29.3″E

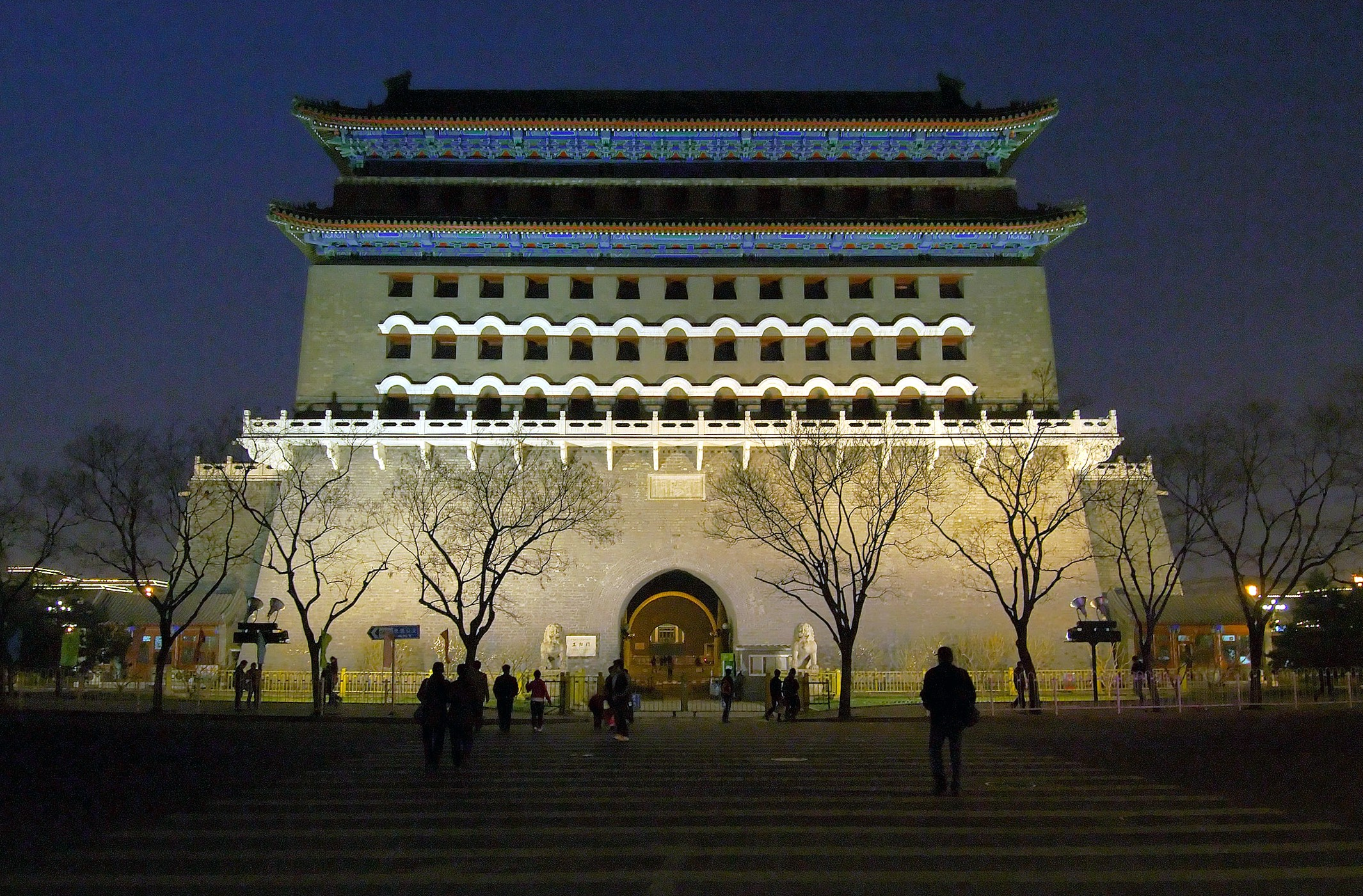
View of the archery tower's facade

Qianmen (Note: simplified Chinese: 前门; traditional Chinese: 前門; pinyin: Qiánmén; Wade–Giles: Ch'ien-men; lit. 'Front Gate') is the colloquial name for Zhengyangmen, (Note: simplified Chinese: 正阳门; traditional Chinese: 正陽門; pinyin: Zhèngyángmén; Wade–Giles: Cheng-yang-men; Manchu: ᡨᠣᠪ ᡧᡠᠨ ᡳ ᡩᡠᡴᠠ, romanized: tob šun-i duka, lit. 'Gate of the Zenith Sun') a gate in Beijing's historic city wall. The gate is situated to the south of Tiananmen Square and once guarded the southern entry into the Inner City. Although much of Beijing's city walls were demolished, Zhengyangmen remains an important geographical marker of the city. The city's central north–south axis passes through Zhengyangmen's main gate. It was formerly named Lizhengmen. (Note: simplified Chinese: 丽正门; traditional Chinese: 麗正門; pinyin: Lìzhèngmén; lit. 'beautiful portal')

== History ==
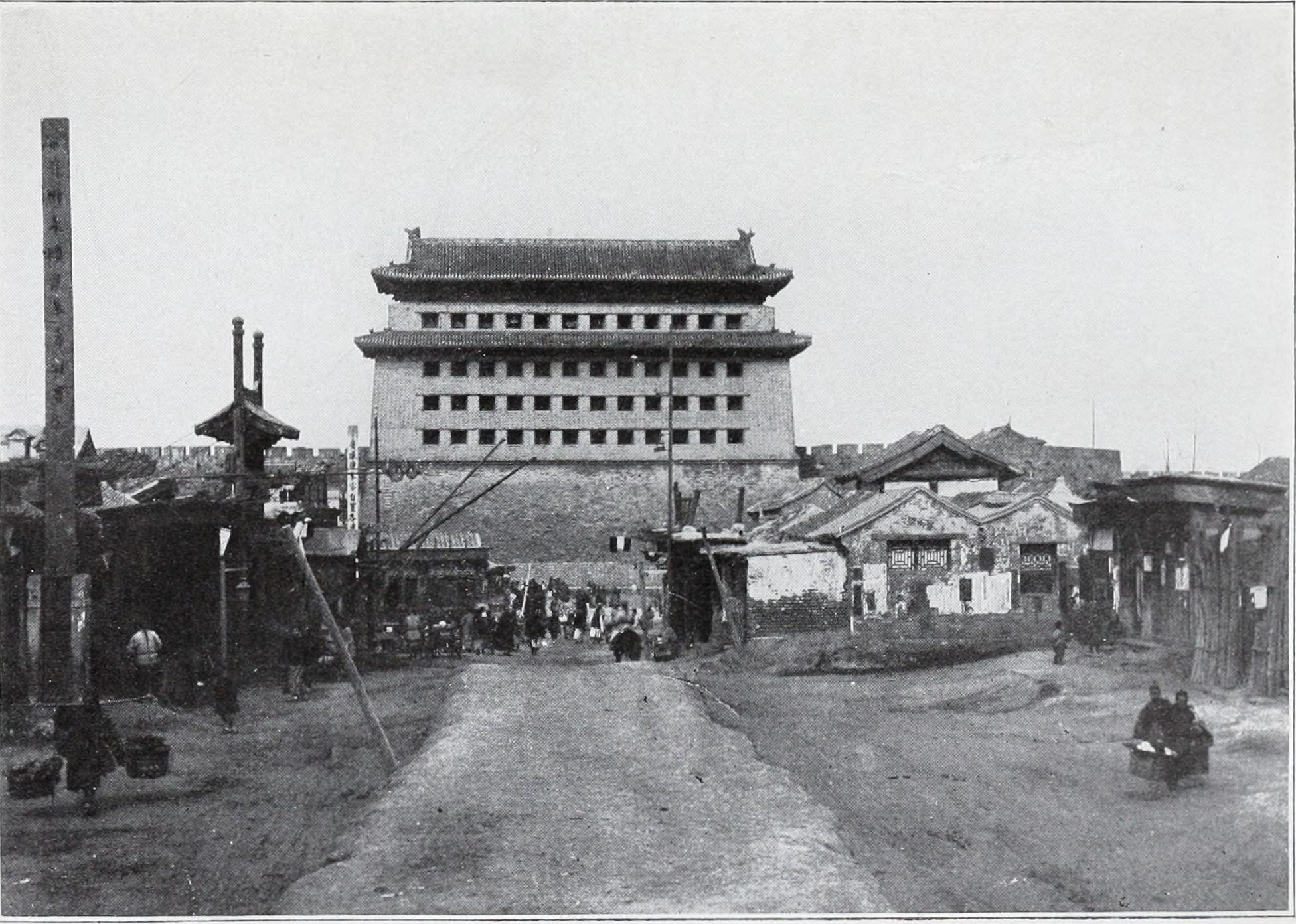
Zhengyangmen 1910

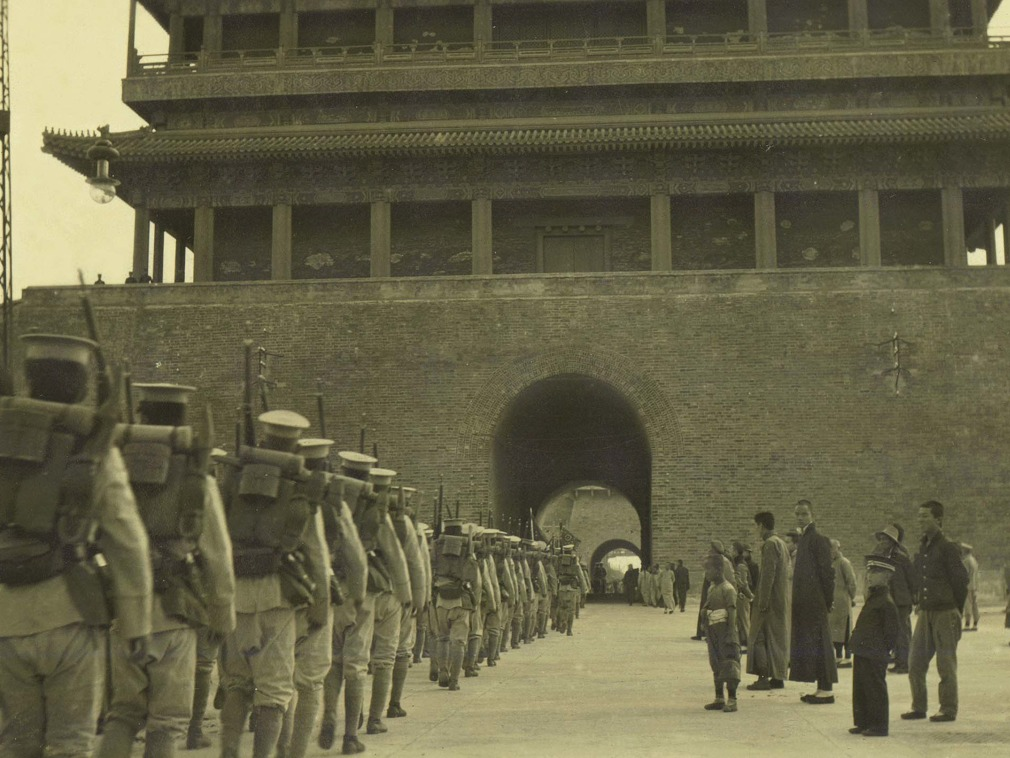
Beiyang Army troops into the Zhengyangmen during 1920s.

Zhengyangmen was first built in 1419 during the Ming dynasty and once consisted of the gatehouse proper and an archery tower, which were connected by side walls and together with side gates, formed a large barbican. The gate guarded the direct entry into the imperial city. The city's first railway station, known as the Qianmen Station, was built just outside the gate. During the Boxer Rebellion of 1900 in the late Qing dynasty, the gate sustained considerable damage when the Eight-Nation Alliance invaded the city. The Hui and Dongxiang Muslim Kansu Braves under Ma Fulu engaged in fierce fighting during the Battle of Beijing at Zhengyangmen against the Eight-Nation Alliance. Ma Fulu and 100 of his fellow Hui and Dongxiang soldiers from his home village died in that battle. Ma Fulu's cousins, Ma Fugui (馬福貴) and Ma Fuquan (馬福全), and his nephews, Ma Yaotu (馬耀圖) and Ma Zhaotu (馬兆圖), were killed in action during the battle. The Qing Empire later violated the Boxer Protocol by having a tower constructed at the gate.

The gate complex was extensively reconstructed in 1914. The barbican side gates were torn down in 1915.

After the Communist victory in the Chinese Civil War in 1949, the Zhengyangmen gatehouse was occupied by the Beijing garrison of the People's Liberation Army. The military vacated the gatehouse in 1980, which has now become a tourist attraction. At 42 metres high, the Zhengyangmen gatehouse was, and remains, the tallest of all gates in Beijing's city wall. Zhengyangmen gatehouse survived the demolition of city walls in the late 1960s during the construction of the Beijing Subway, while other gates such as Deshengmen in the north and Dongbianmen in the southeast only have their archery towers standing. Xibianmen retains only part of its barbican while Yongdingmen's gatehouse was rebuilt in 2007.

Today, Qianmen Avenue (Dajie) cuts between the Zhengyangmen gatehouse and the archery tower to the south. Line 2's Qianmen Station is also located between the two structures inside the space once surrounded by the barbican.

Qianmen remains one of the enduring symbols of old Beijing.

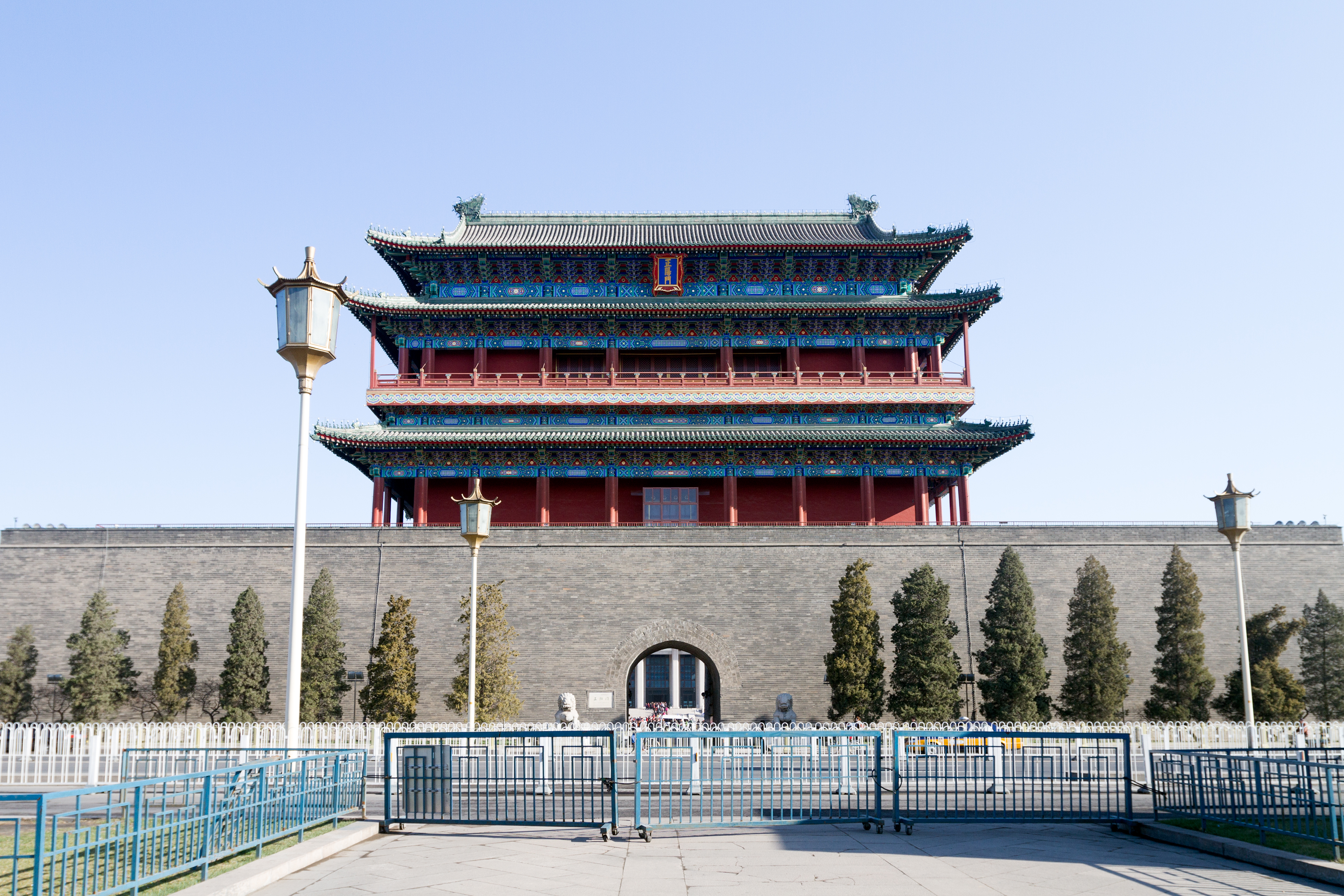
Gatehouse

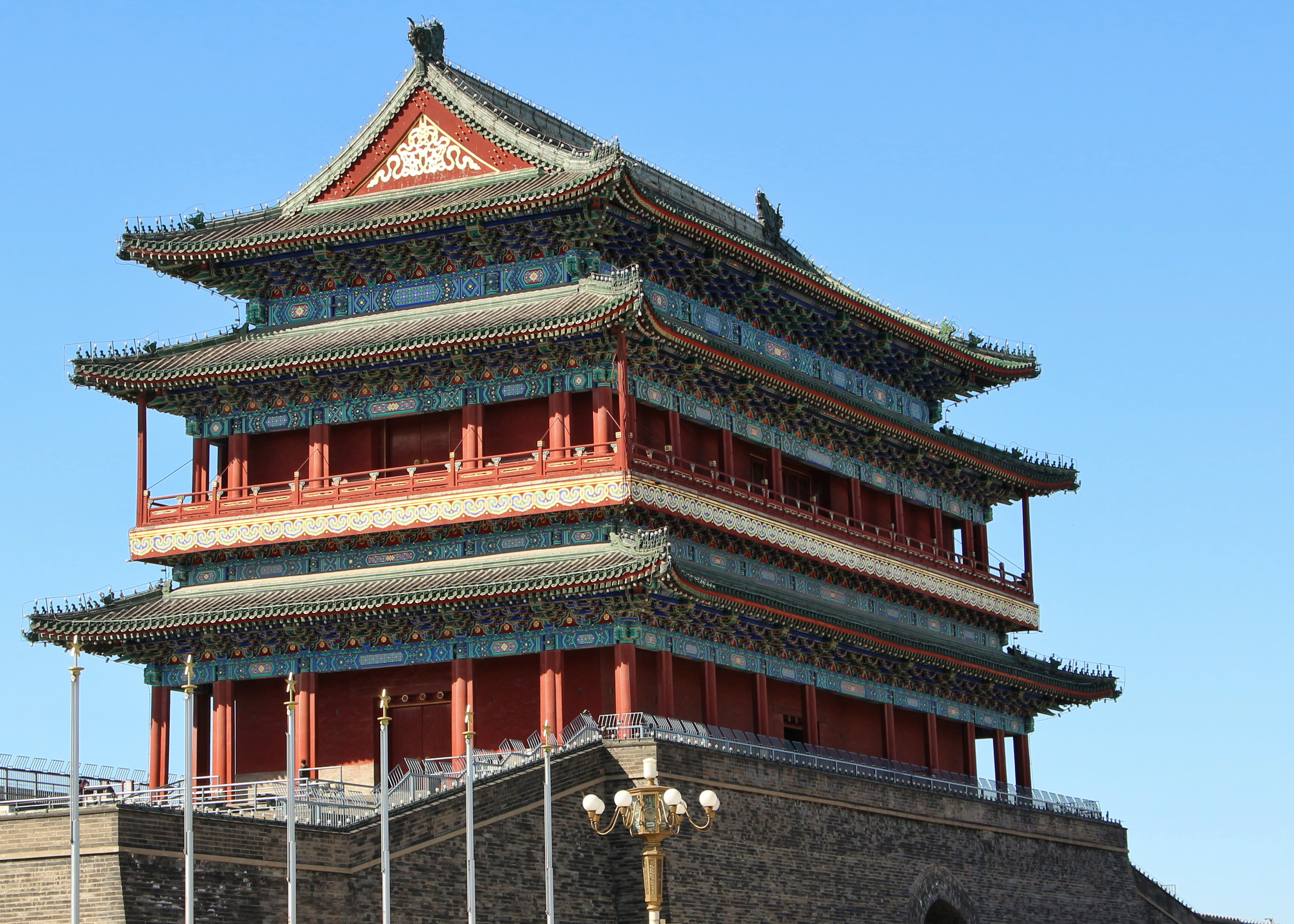
Gatehouse

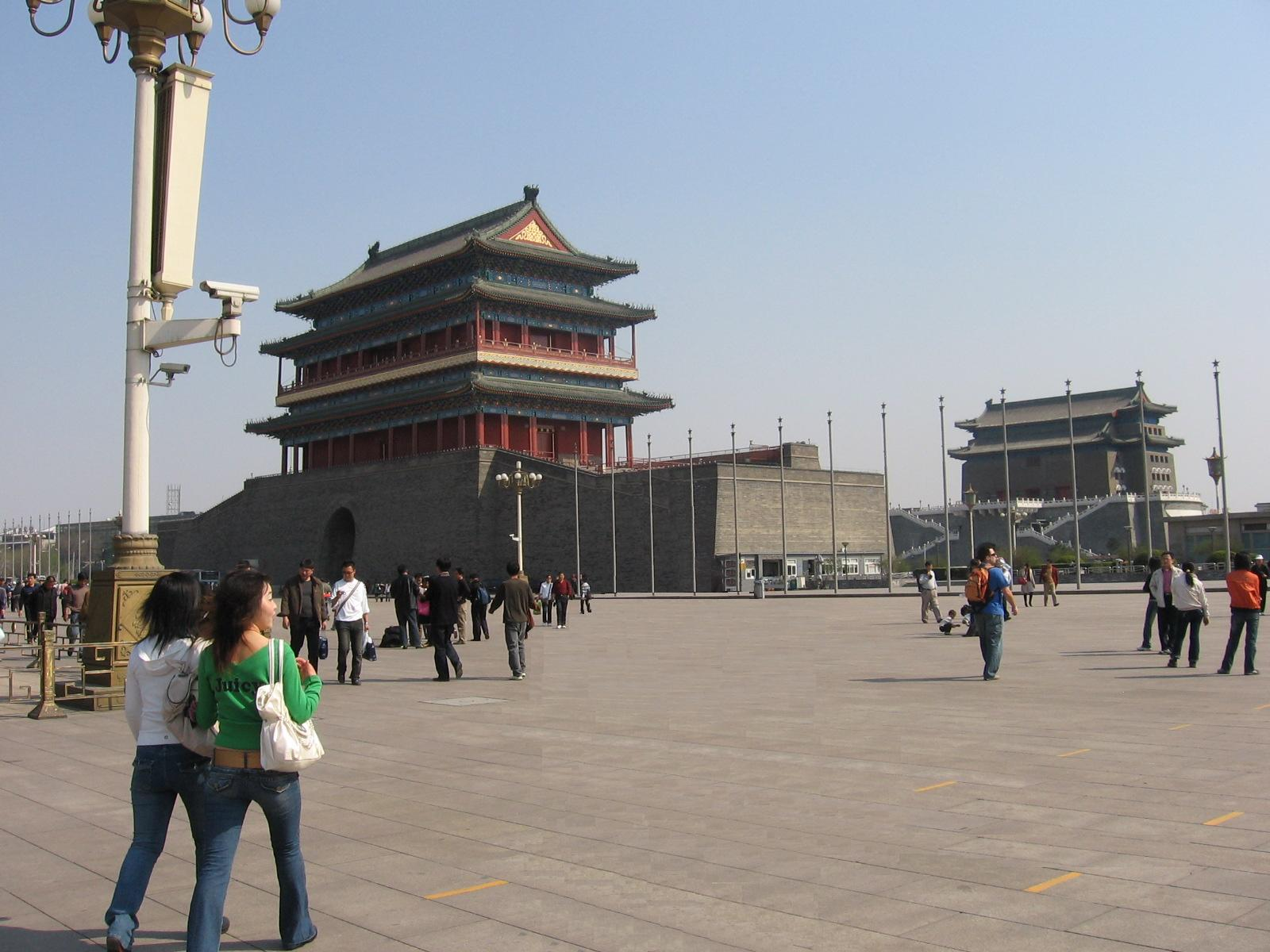
View from Tiananmen Square with the gatehouse (left) and archery tower (right) further south

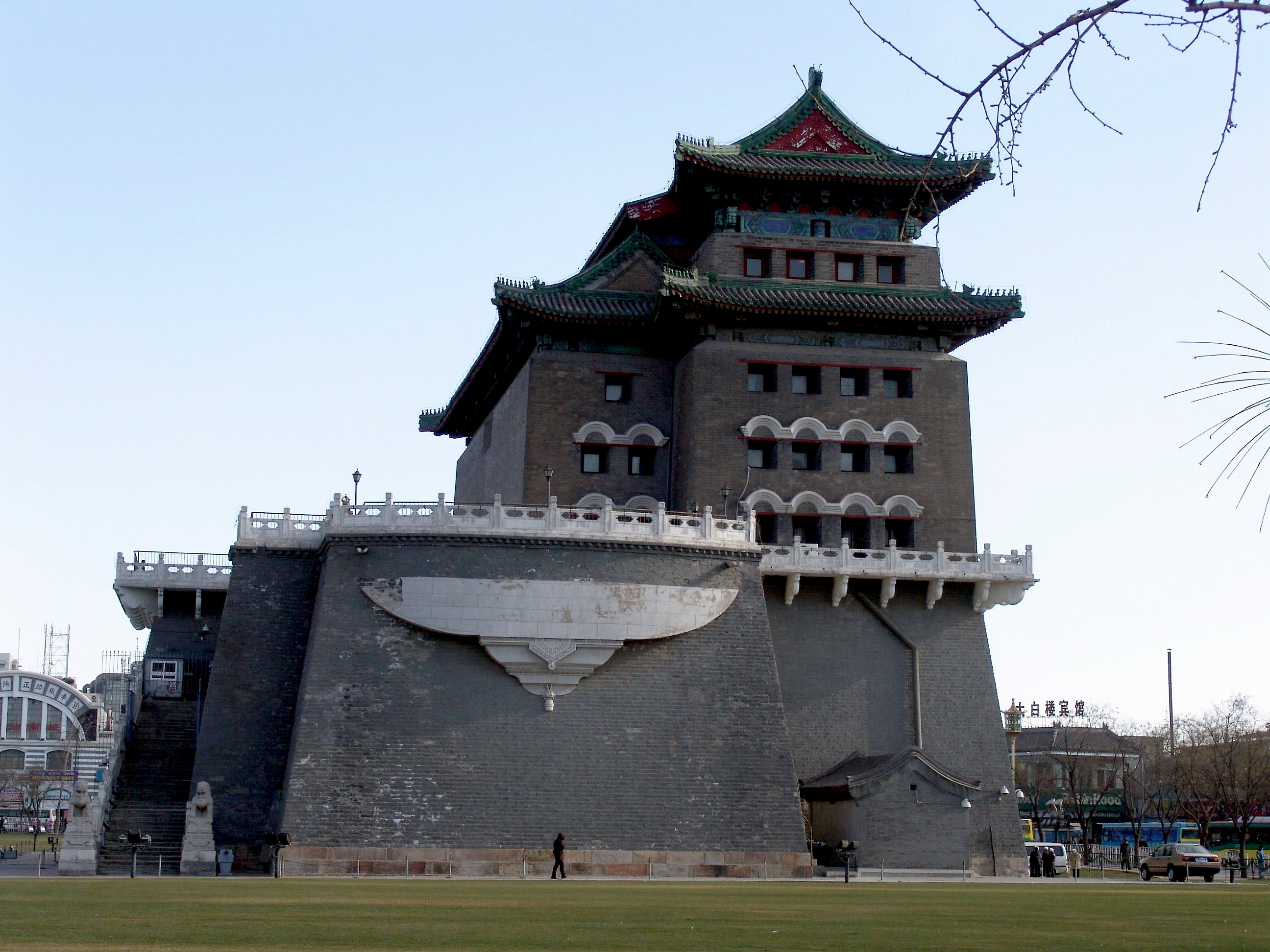
Archery tower viewed from the west

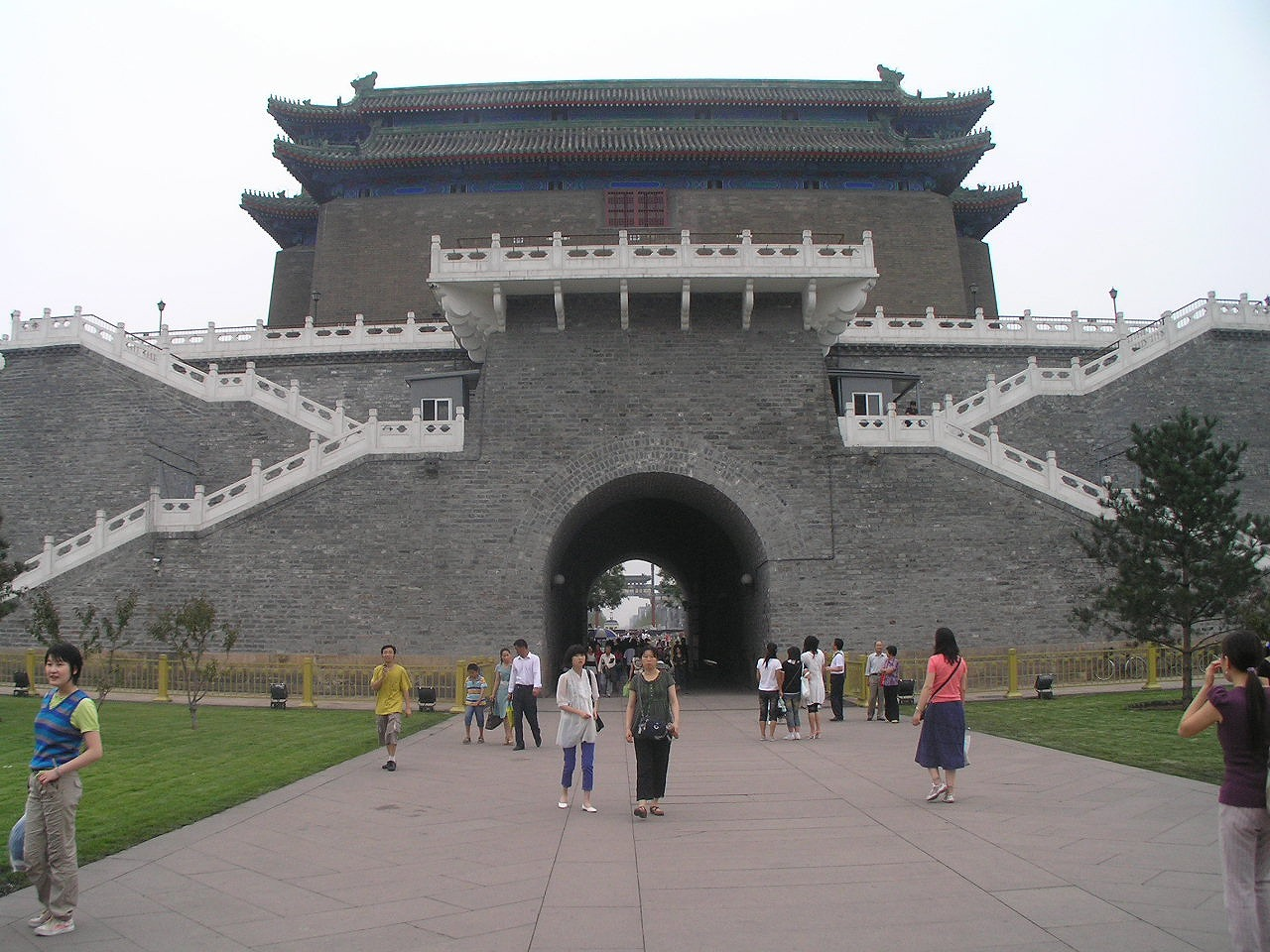
Archery tower viewed from the north

== Geographical Significance ==
The Zhengyangmen is situated on the central north–south axis of Beijing. The main gateway of the gatehouse is aligned with Yongdingmen Gate to the south, the Mausoleum of Mao Zedong and the Monument to the People's Heroes in Tiananmen Square, the Tiananmen Gate itself, the Meridian Gate, and the imperial throne in the Hall of Supreme Harmony in the Forbidden City, the city's Drum and Bell Towers and the entrance to the Olympic Green in the far north.

The kilometre zero point for highways in China is located just outside the Zhengyangmen Gate. It is marked with a plaque in the ground, with the four cardinal points, four animals, and "Zero Point of Highways, China" in English and Chinese.

== Surrounding area ==
The area near Qianmen includes several areas of historical significance. The avenue which proceeds south from the Qianmen is known as "Qianmen Street", and has been a commercial centre for several centuries, although it now mainly caters to tourists from other parts of China. Since a redevelopment in the 2000s by property developer SOHO China, shopfront tenants along Qianmen Street have been predominantly international brands which cater neither to local residents nor domestic visitors, with the result that Qianmen Avenue is now often largely deserted. Dashilanr is a well-known cross-street with a similar character. The Peking duck restaurant Quanjude is located on Qianmen Street. The Qianmen area is also home to Beijing's narrowest hutong, the Qianshi hutong.

== Transportation ==
Beijing Subway Line 2 and Line 8 have a stop at Qianmen. Beijing bus routes 8, 17, 48, 66, 67, 69, 71, 82, 93, 126, 623, BRT1 (快速公交1), Tourist route 2 (观光2), Special 4 (特4), and Special 7 (特7) have a terminal at Qianmen.
