= Longjing prawns =

Chinese seafood dish

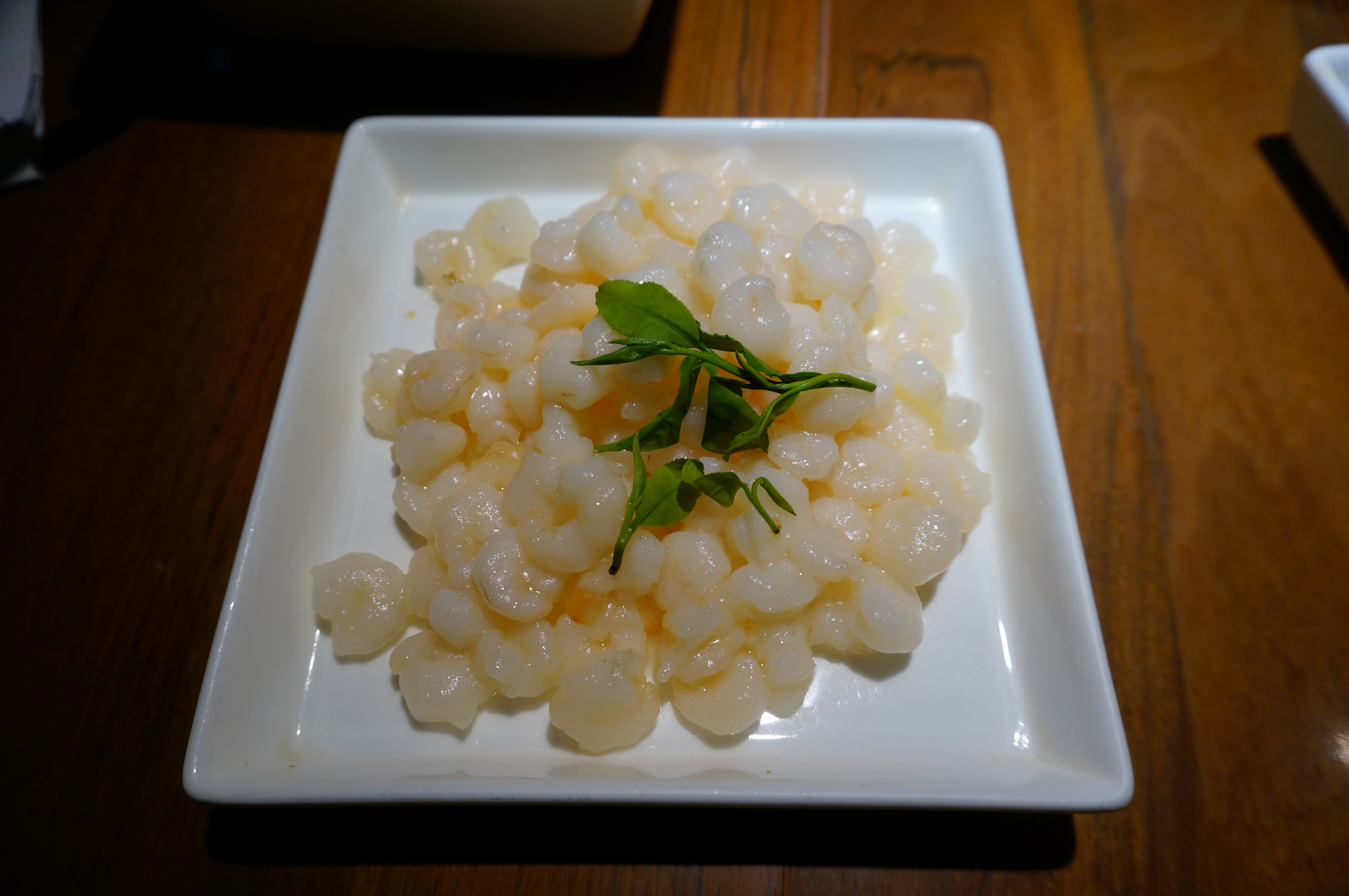
- Traditional Chinese: 龍井蝦仁
- Simplified Chinese: 龙井虾仁
Transcriptions
Standard Mandarin
- Hanyu Pinyin: Lóngjǐng xiārén

Longjing prawns, also known as shrimp stir-fried with Dragon Well tea, is a specialty of Hangzhou City, Zhejiang Province, produced using the meat of live river prawns coated with egg white and moistened starch, fried in lard at a medium-low temperature for 15 seconds, removed from the oil and drained when jade-white in colour, and then quickly stir-fried over extreme heat with boiling water infused with Longjing tea, tea leaves and Shaoxing wine. This dish consists primarily of white and green colours; the colours are elegant and the flavour is light and fragrant. According to legend it arose when the Qianlong Emperor of the Qing dynasty visited southern China. Hangzhou's famous Louwailou restaurant is a well-known producer of Longjing prawns.

== See also ==
- Tempura
- Zhejiang cuisine
