= List of restaurants in China =

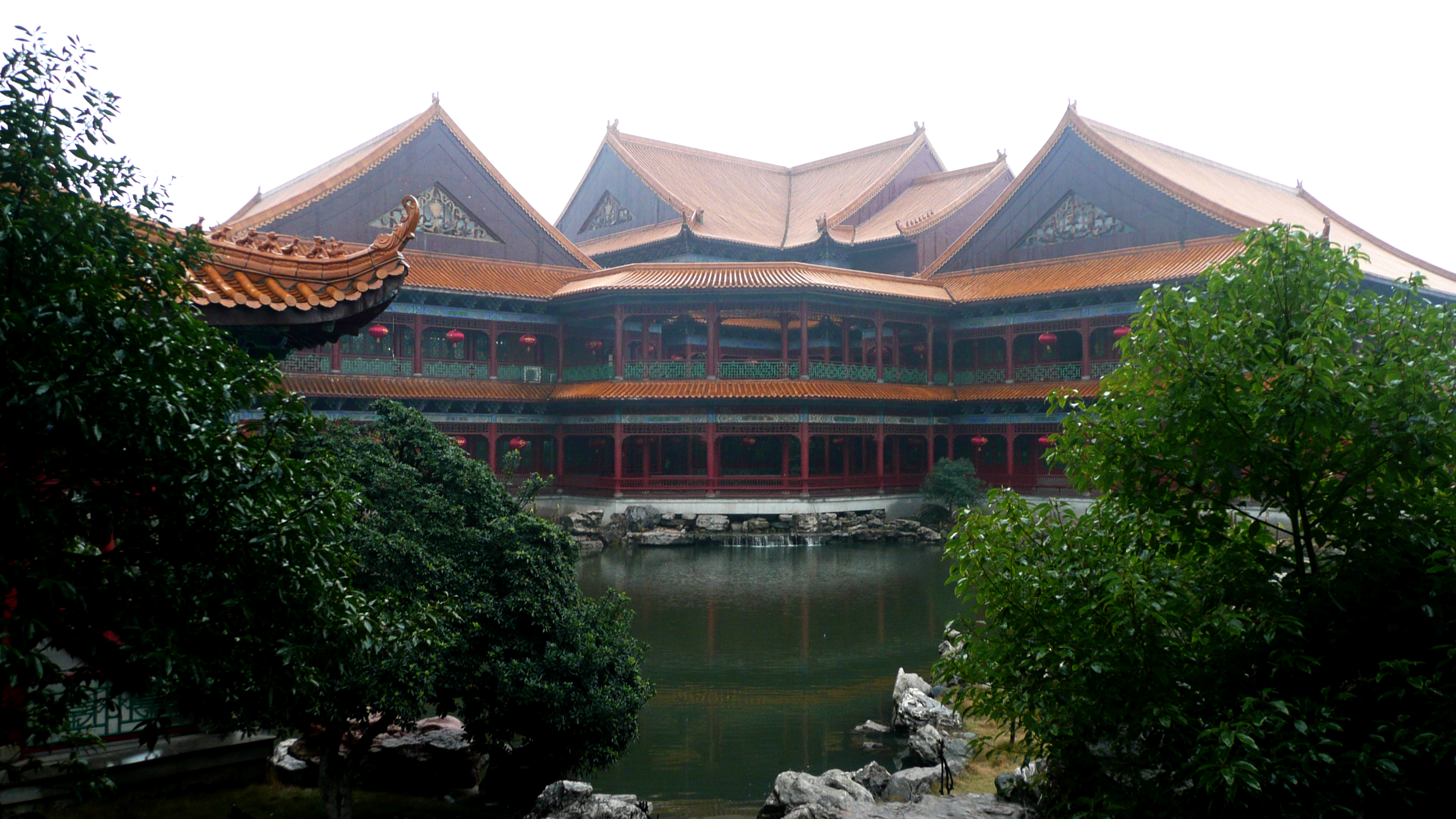
West Lake Restaurant in Changsha, Hunan, China, is the largest restaurant in Asia, and the largest Chinese restaurant in the world.

This is a list of notable restaurants in China.

== Restaurants ==
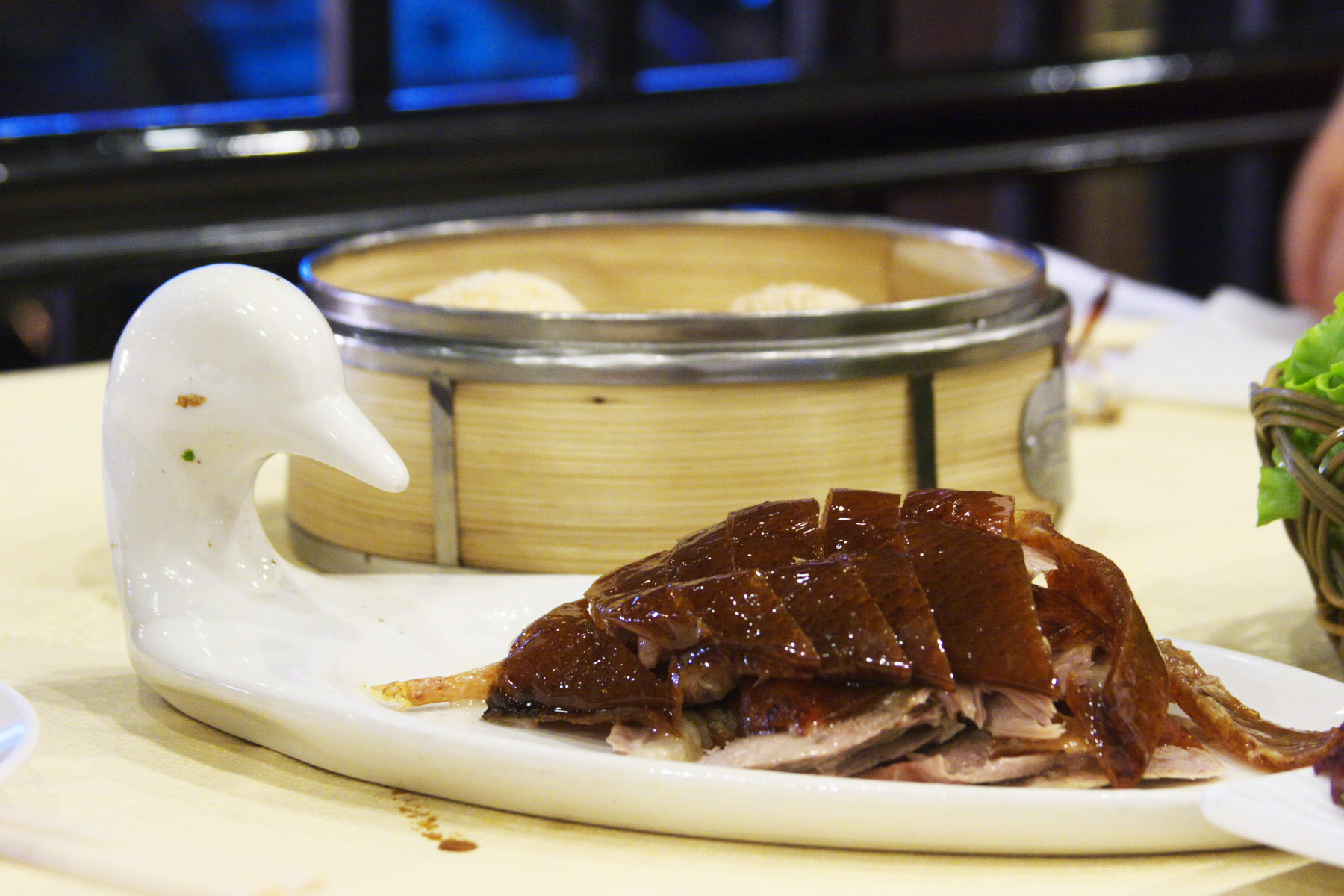
Peking duck at Bianyifang

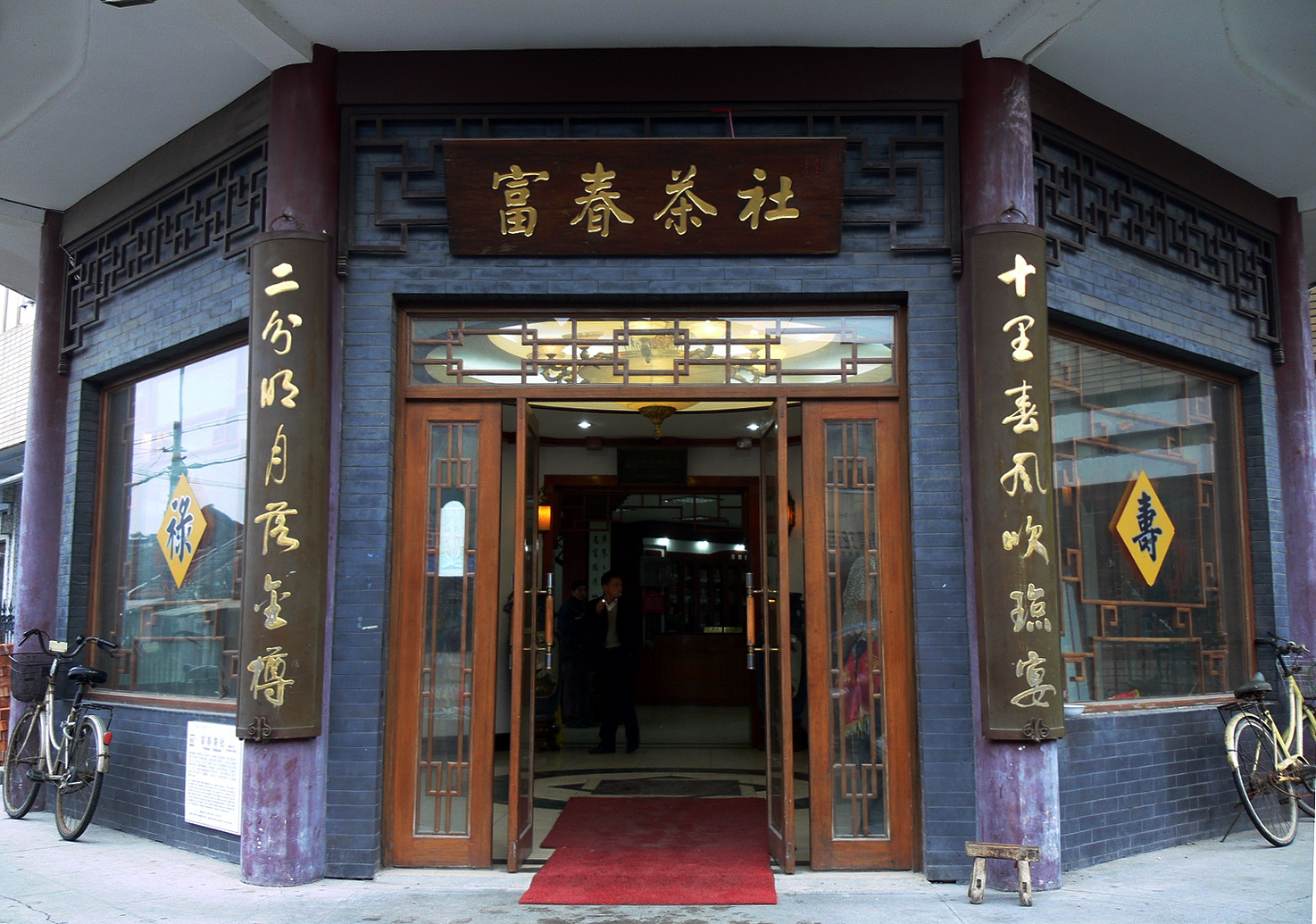
Fuchun Teahouse

- Bao Du Feng – Traditional restaurant in Beijing, China
- Bianyifang
- Da Dong Roast Duck Restaurant
- Dragon Well Manor – Restaurant in Hangzhou, China
- El Willy
- Hai Di Lao hot pot – Chinese hot pot restaurant chain
- Laobian Dumpling – Chinese restaurant chain
- Little Sheep Group – Chinese hot pot restaurant
- Lou Wai Lou – Traditional restaurant in Hangzhou, Zhejiang, China
- M on the Bund
- Ma Yu Ching's Bucket Chicken House – Historic restaurant in Kaifeng, Henan, China
- Nanxiang Steamed Bun Restaurant – Restaurant in Shanghai, China
- Quanjude – Chinese restaurant chain that serves Peking duck
- Ultraviolet – Single-table restaurant in Shanghai, China
- West Lake Restaurant
- Xian Heng Inn – Restaurant in Shaoxing, China

== Coffee and tea houses ==
- Fuchun Teahouse – Historic traditional teahouse in Yangzhou, Jiangsu, China
- Luckin Coffee – Chinese coffeehouse chain
- Pacific Coffee Company – Hong Kong based coffee chain

== Fast food chains ==
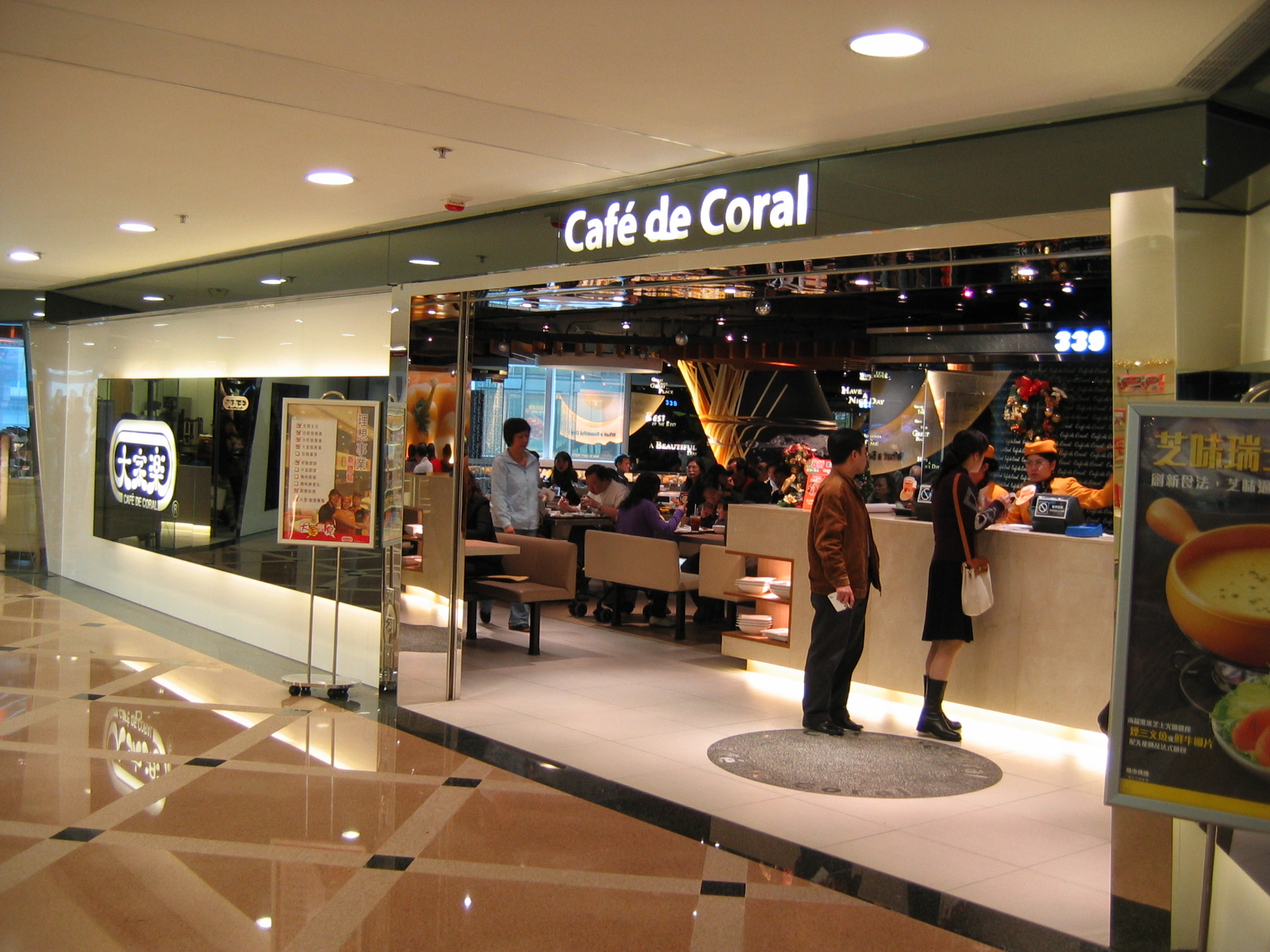
A Café de Coral fast food restaurant

- Café de Coral – Hong Kong Fast food
- Dicos – Chinese fast food restaurant chain
- East Dawning – Chinese fast food restaurant chain
- Fairwood – Hong Kong fast food chain
- Hui Lau Shan – Desert shop chain from Hong Kong
- Kungfu – Chinese fast food restaurant chain
- Mr. Lee – Fast-food chain in mainland China
- Yonghe King – Chinese fast food restaurant chain
- Home Original Chicken – Chinese fast food chain

== See also ==
- Chinese cuisine
- Chinese restaurant
- Chinese restaurants (category)
- List of companies of China
- List of Chinese dishes
- List of Chinese desserts
- List of Chinese restaurants
- List of Michelin starred restaurants – Hong Kong
- List of restaurants in Hong Kong
- Lists of restaurants
