= Laobian Dumpling =

Chinese restaurant chain

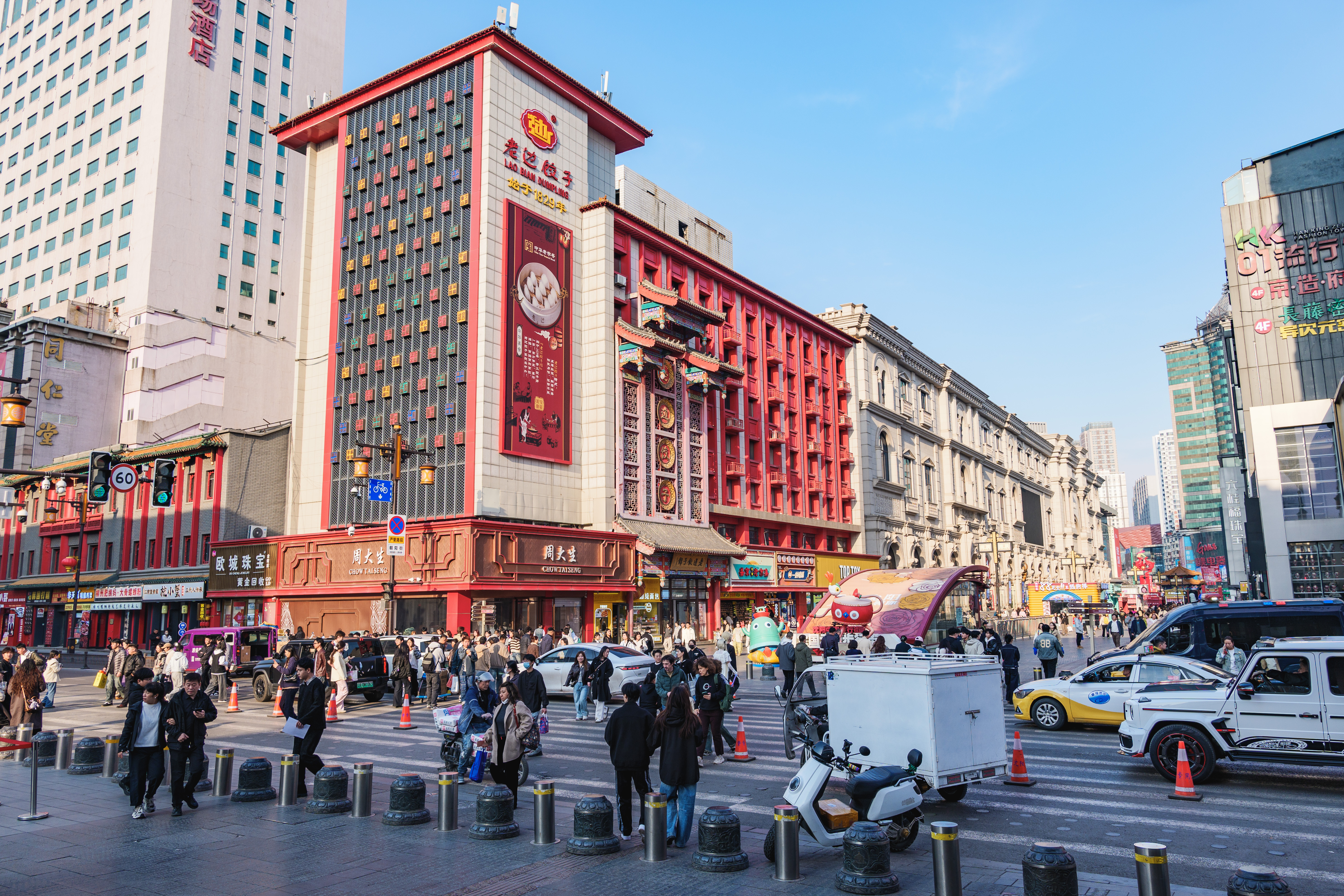
- Shenyang Zhongjie Flagship Laobian Dumpling Location
- Native name: 老边饺子
- Type: Restaurant chain
- Industry: Restaurant
- Founded: 1829
- Founder: Bian Fu
- Headquarters: No. 208, Laobian Dumpling Restaurant (Zhongjie Branch), Shenyang, China
- Number of locations: 200 stores (2026)
- Area served: China, Japan
- Key people: Cui Tao (崔韬) (chairman)
- Products: dumpling, jiaozi
- Website: http://www.laobian.com.cn/

Laobian Dumpling (Chinese: 老边饺子; pinyin: Lǎobiān Jiǎozi), founded in 1829, is a Chinese restaurant chain specializing in Chinese cuisine, particularly famous for its dumplings and longstanding culinary heritage. Based in Shenyang, Liaoning, China, it has branches across China as well as Japan, and is a China Time-honored Brand. Additionally, the company holds the Guinness World Record as the oldest dumpling restaurant in the world.

== History ==
Laobian Dumpling originated during the Daoguang period of the Qing dynasty. The founder, Bian Fusheng, was born in Renqiu, Hebei Province, and later moved to Shenyang to make a living. In 1940, Bian Lin, the third-generation successor of Bian Family Dumplings, moved the dumpling restaurant to the North Market in Shenyang. The fifth-generation successor was Bian Lin's grandson, Bian Jiang, who took over the business around the 1990s, until ownership was transferred again later on.

In June 2016, during a state visit to Shenyang, former German Chancellor Angela Merkel was served curated dishes from the restaurant by Laobian Dumpling chefs at the Shenyang Shangri‑La Hotel, and a special dumpling dish was subsequently nicknamed the "Angela Merkel Dumpling" in her honor.

== Company profile ==
The current chairman and legal representative of Laobian Dumpling is Cui Tao (崔韬), who serves as chairman and general manager of the enterprise.

The company has a registered capital of RMB 2.79 million and an operating range including restaurant operations, catering services, and frozen food services.

In addition to major cities in China, Laobian Dumpling also has branches in Japan.

== Locations ==
=== China ===
- Shenyang
  - Shenhe District (Zhongjie Road) - Flagship location
  - Changbai District (Changbai branch)
  - Shenyang Taoxian Intl' Airport (Food court branch)
- Beijing
  - Haidian District (Zhongguancun Tower)
  - Xicheng District (Hufangqiao)
  - Xicheng District (Hepingmen branch)
  - Fengtai District (Beijing South railway station)
  - Fangshan District (Changyang Plaza)
- Guangzhou
  - Yuexiu District (Si You New Road branch)
- Haikou
  - Xiuying District (Yongwan Road branch)

This list includes only verified branches. Laobian Dumpling currently operates over 200 branches across China that are not listed here due to a lack of independent sources for each specific store.

=== Japan ===
- Tokyo
  - Shinjuku District (Shinjuku Main Branch)
  - Shinjuku District (Shinjuku Annex)

== Reputation ==
Laobian Dumpling is the oldest continuously operating dumpling restaurant in the world, certified by Guinness World Records as the "World's Longest-Running Dumpling Restaurant"" in 2000.

It is also recognised as one of Shenyang’s most historic and culturally significant restaurant brands. It is a China Time-honored establishment. Its traditional craftsmanship was formally recognised in 2011 when the Laobian dumpling preparation method was listed as a provincial intangible cultural heritage by authorities in Liaoning Province.

The brand has also been cited in national media as a notable example of a traditional Chinese culinary enterprise. Laobian Dumplings has been designated as a Liaoning Famous Brand and a Shenyang Famous Brand.

== See also ==
- List of China Time-honored Brands
- List of Chinese restaurants
- List of restaurants in China
- Bafang Dumpling
- Media related to Laobian Dumpling at Wikimedia Commons
