= Liubiju =

Chinese traditional-food manufacturer

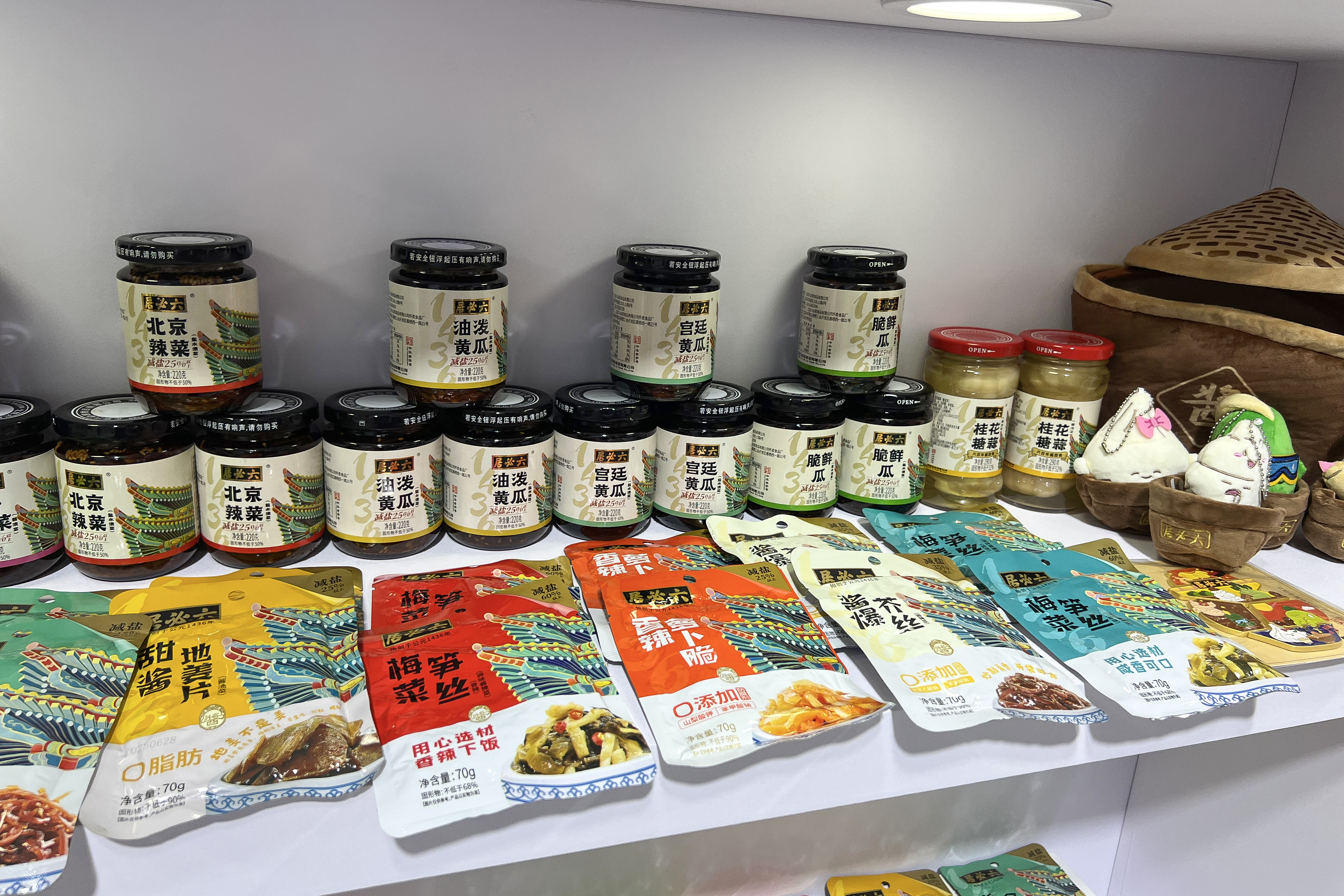
- Native name: 北京六必居食品有限公司; Liu Biju Peking Food Co., Ltd.
- Industry: Food
- Founded: 1530
- Headquarters: 3 Niangshi Jie, Qianmen, Dongcheng District, Beijing, China

Liubiju (Chinese: 六必居; pinyin: Liùbìjū) is a Beijing-based manufacturer of traditional Chinese sauces, pickles, and seasonings. It is also a China Time-Honored Brand, well known for its sauce (yellow soybean paste and sweet soy sauce) and pickles.

== History and legend ==
Liubiju is rumored as having been founded in 1530 during the Ming Dynasty (specifically, in the ninth year of the Jiajing Emperor). However, the company was actually founded during the Kangxi period of the Qing dynasty (1661-1722).

One common story about the shop's origin is that it was founded by 3 brothers from Linfen city in Shanxi province of North China. Zhao Cunren, Zhao Cunyi and Zhao Cunli ran a small shop with daily necessities. According to this story, the name Liubiju comes from the Chinese proverb "开门七件事：柴、米、油、盐、酱、醋、茶" (English: Seven items needed for going into business: firewood, rice, oil, salt, sauce, vinegar, and tea). Because the shop sold all of these except tea, it got the name Liubiju, roughly translating to 'six must be there'.

The pickles are not brined, but prepared in different seasonings. All kinds of sauces made with soybean are sold in bottles, jars and pouches.

== See also ==
- List of oldest companies
