= Fuchun Teahouse =

Historic traditional teahouse in Yangzhou, Jiangsu, China

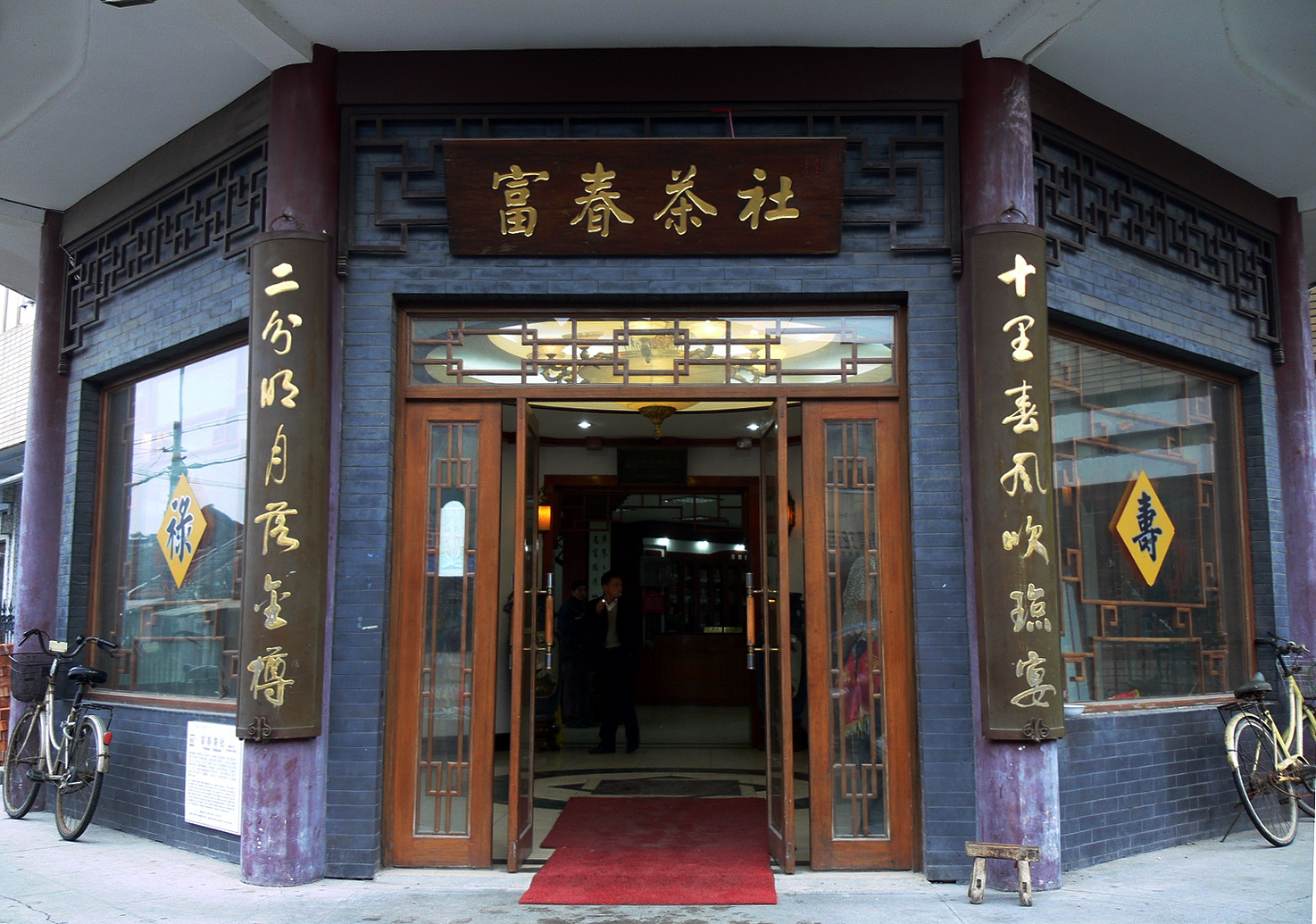
Fuchun Teahouse

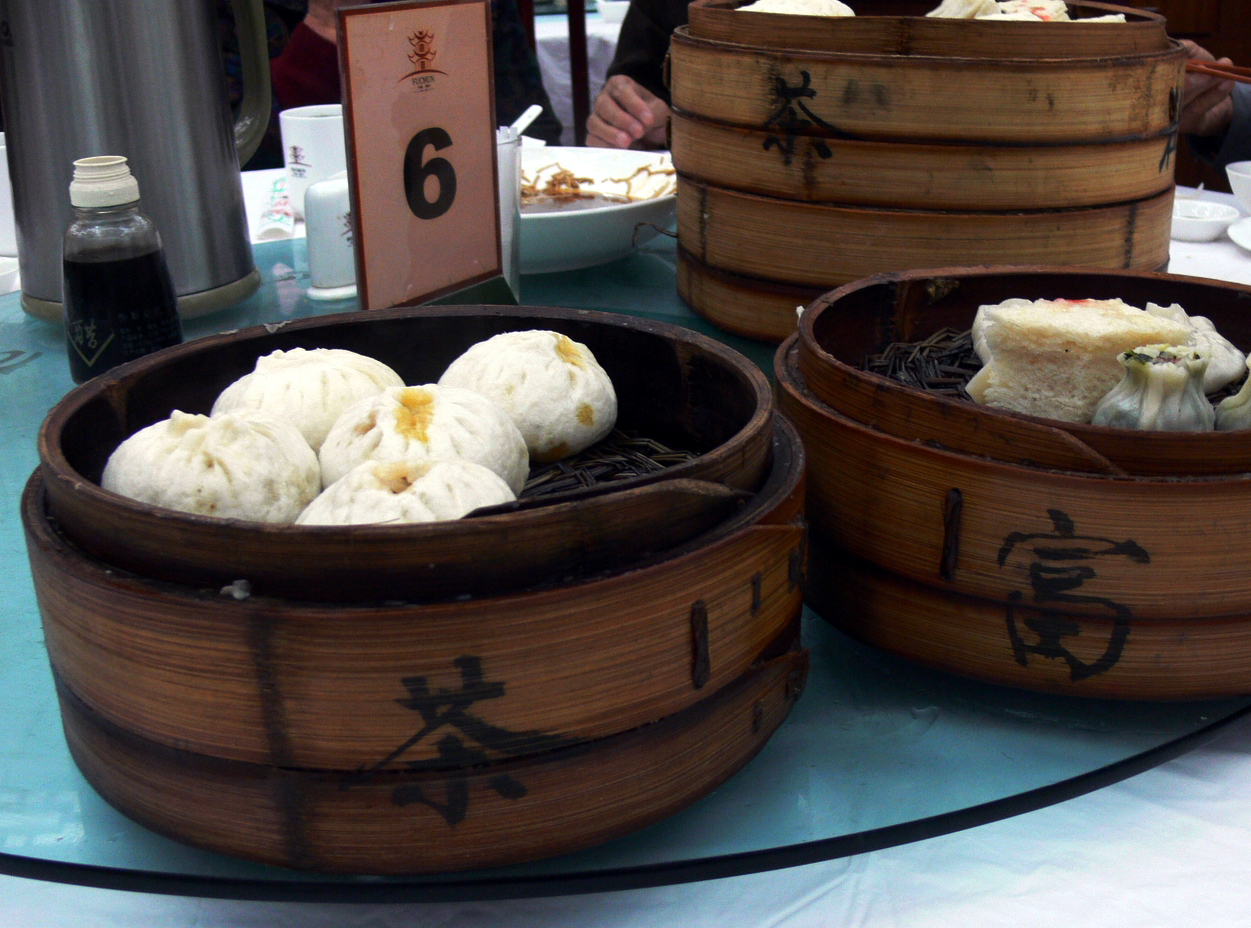
Fuchun buns (baozi)

Fùchūn Teahouse (Chinese: 富春茶社) is a historic traditional teahouse in Yangzhou, Jiangsu, China, located on Deshengqiao Alley (得胜桥). Established in 1885, it is known for its trademark Fuchun baozi and its self-made tea Kuilongzhu (Chinese: 魁龙珠). The restaurant has won numerous awards. In 2008, its traditional dim sum was inscribed on the list of intangible cultural heritage of China, and Fuchun was officially named a "China Famous Brand" in 2010.

== See also ==
- List of Chinese restaurants
- List of restaurants in China
