= West Lake Restaurant =

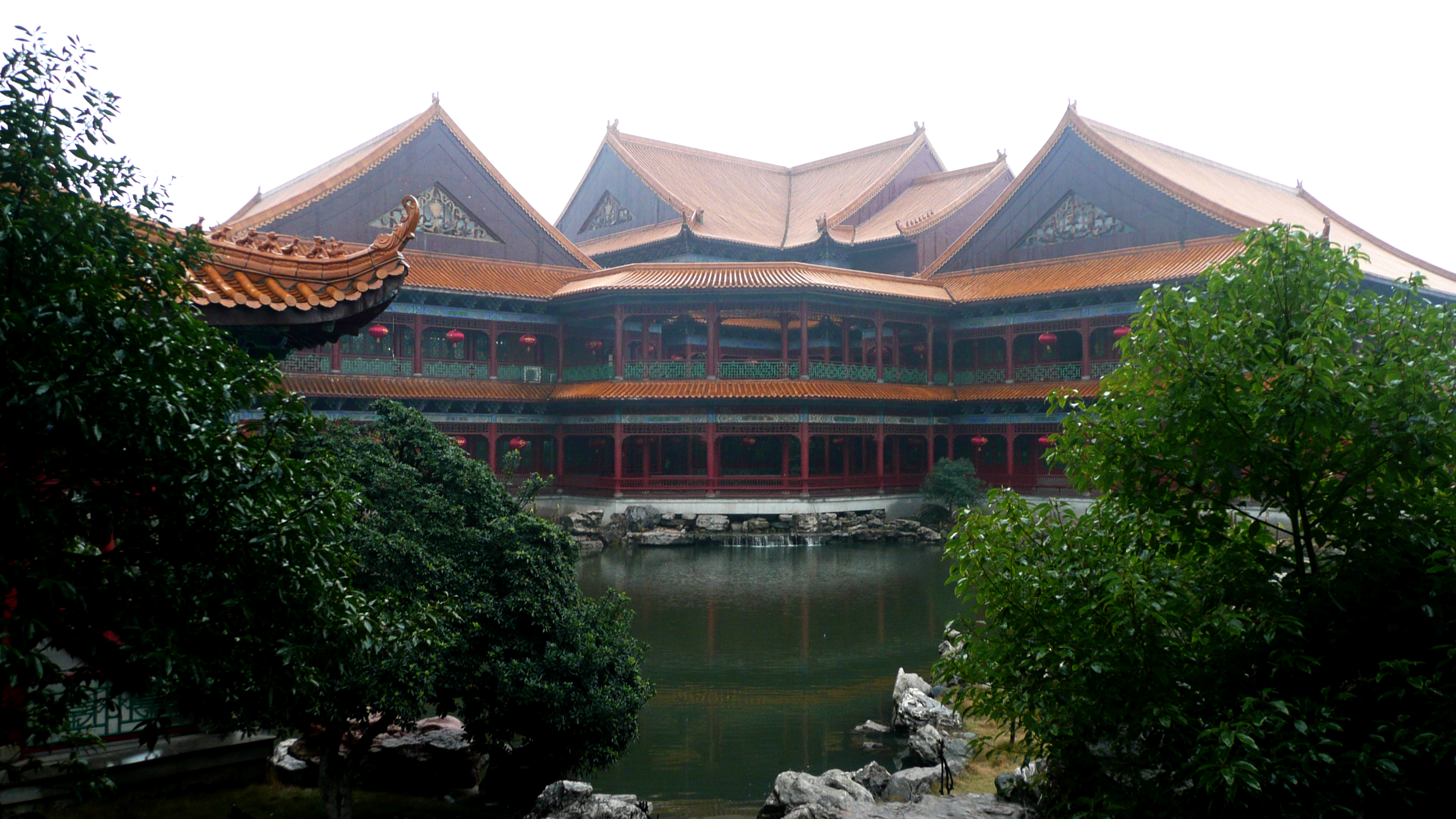
- View of West Lake Restaurant in Changsha
- Interactive map of West Lake Restaurant

Restaurant information
- Established: 2000
- Food type: Hunan cuisine, Cantonese cuisine
- Location: Changsha, Hunan, China
- Coordinates: 28°14′11″N 113°02′11″E
- Seating capacity: 5,000
- Website: www.xihulou.com

West Lake Restaurant (Chinese: 西湖楼; pinyin: Xīhúlóu) is a restaurant in Changsha, capital of the central Chinese province of Hunan, and one of the largest restaurants in the world. With its 5,000 seats, it is considered the largest restaurant in China and in Asia, according to an entry in the Guinness Book of Records for being the biggest Chinese restaurant in the world.

== History ==
In 2000, the Xihulou restaurant was opened in the city of Liuyang, in early 2003, the construction of the new dining facility started in Changsha. After more than a year of construction, the new West Lake Restaurant opened in October 2004.

== Location, service, and operations ==
The restaurant complex is located 20 minutes from Changsha Huanghua International Airport, and covers an area of about 5.8 hectares. The numerous buildings were constructed in the traditional Chinese architectural style. The entire complex covers four different areas. Area A includes 70 large and small rooms, together with a performance hall, where daily shows take place. Area B comprises ten luxury private rooms in the style of Imperial Palaces. Area C has nine private luxury rooms, and area D is a "Snack Food Street". The restaurant mainly offers traditional Chinese dishes of Hunan cuisine and Cantonese cuisine. The restaurant employs a thousand people, including 300 chefs in five kitchens. Each week, approximately 700 chickens and 2,600 pounds of pork are used.

== Publicity ==
In May 2008, the BBC broadcast, as part of its Storyville documentary series, the four-part series entitled The Biggest Chinese Restaurant in the World, exploring the inner workings of the restaurant.

== Gallery ==
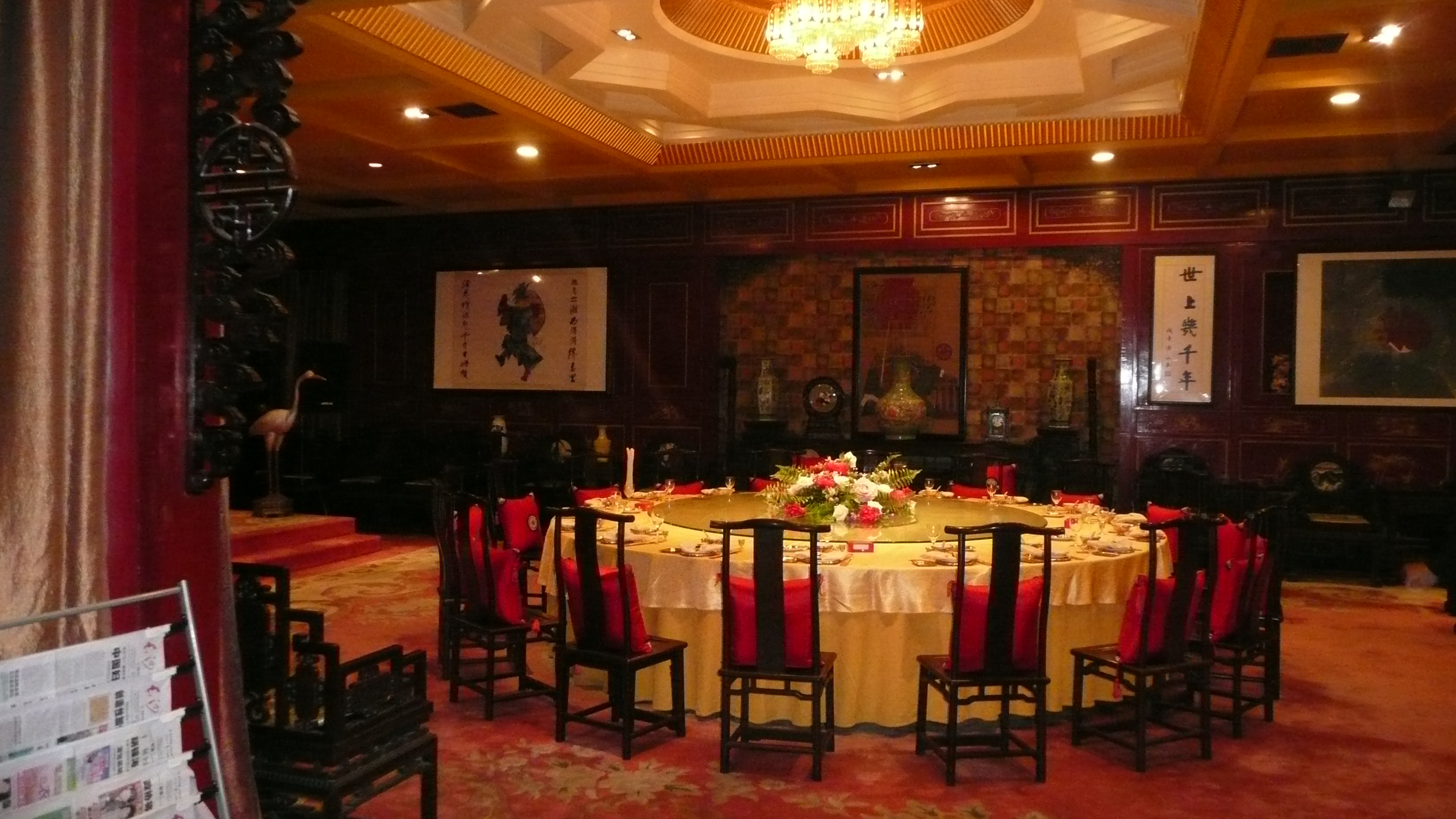
Imperial Dining Room

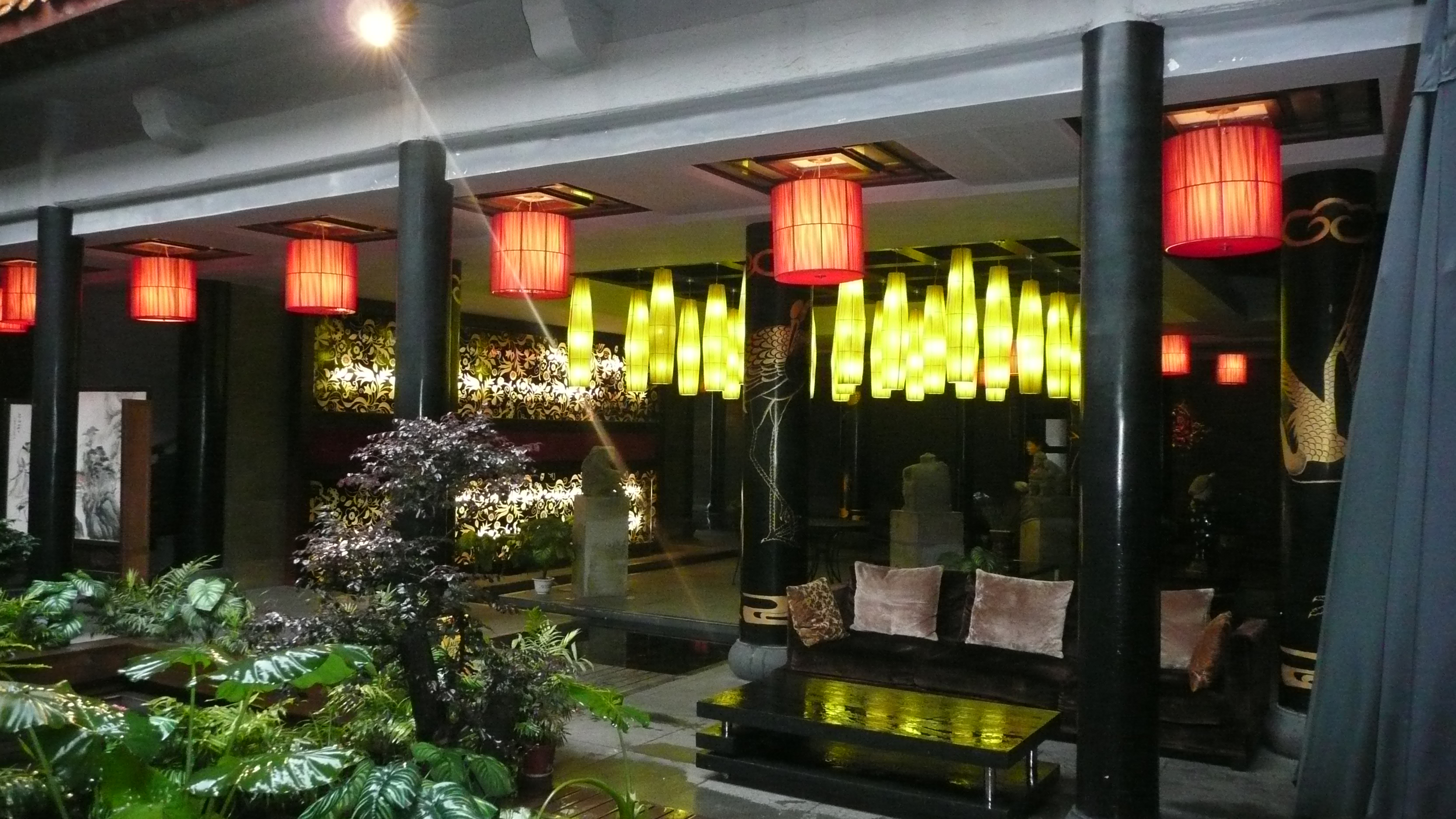
Lounge

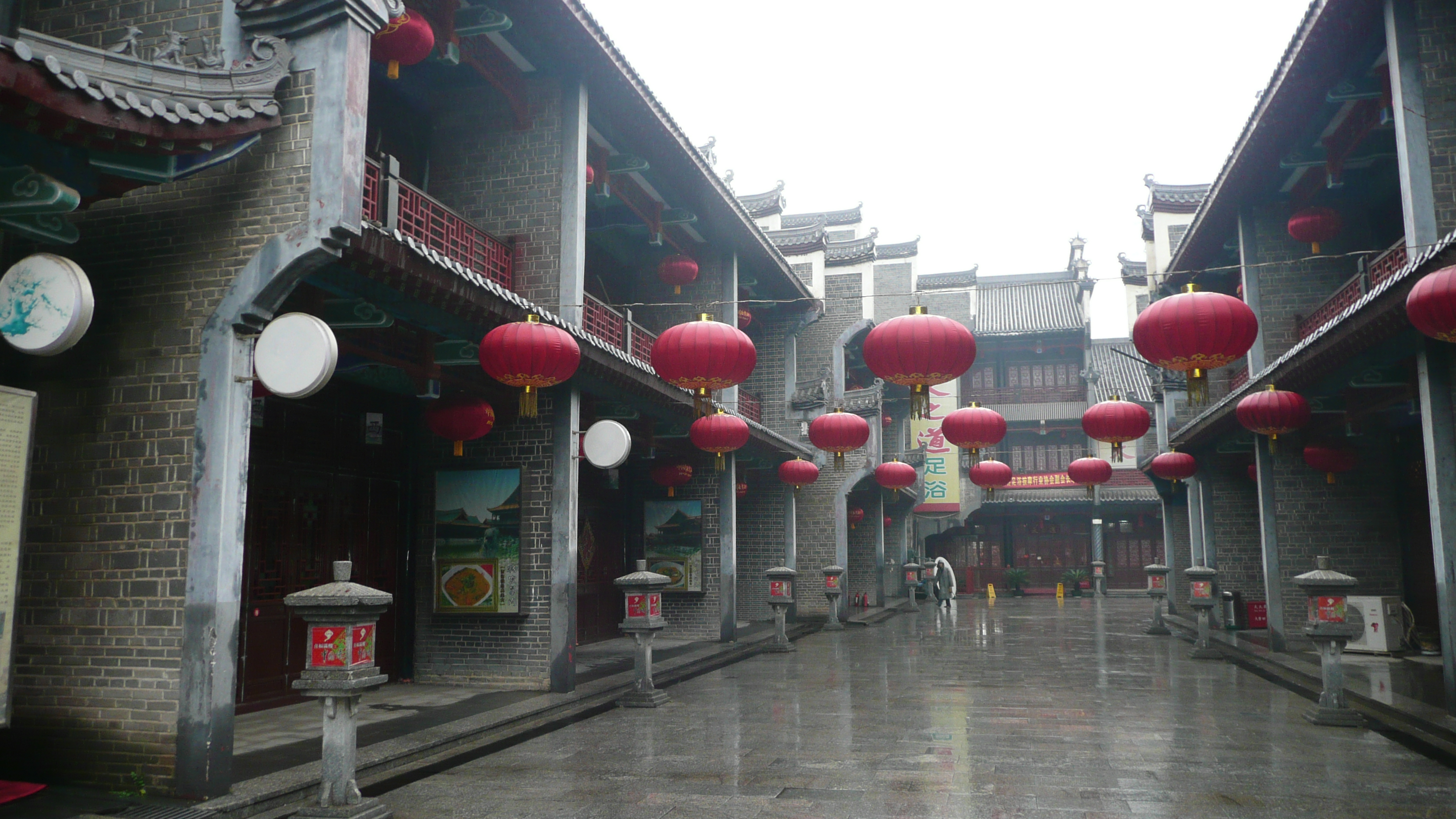
Snack Street

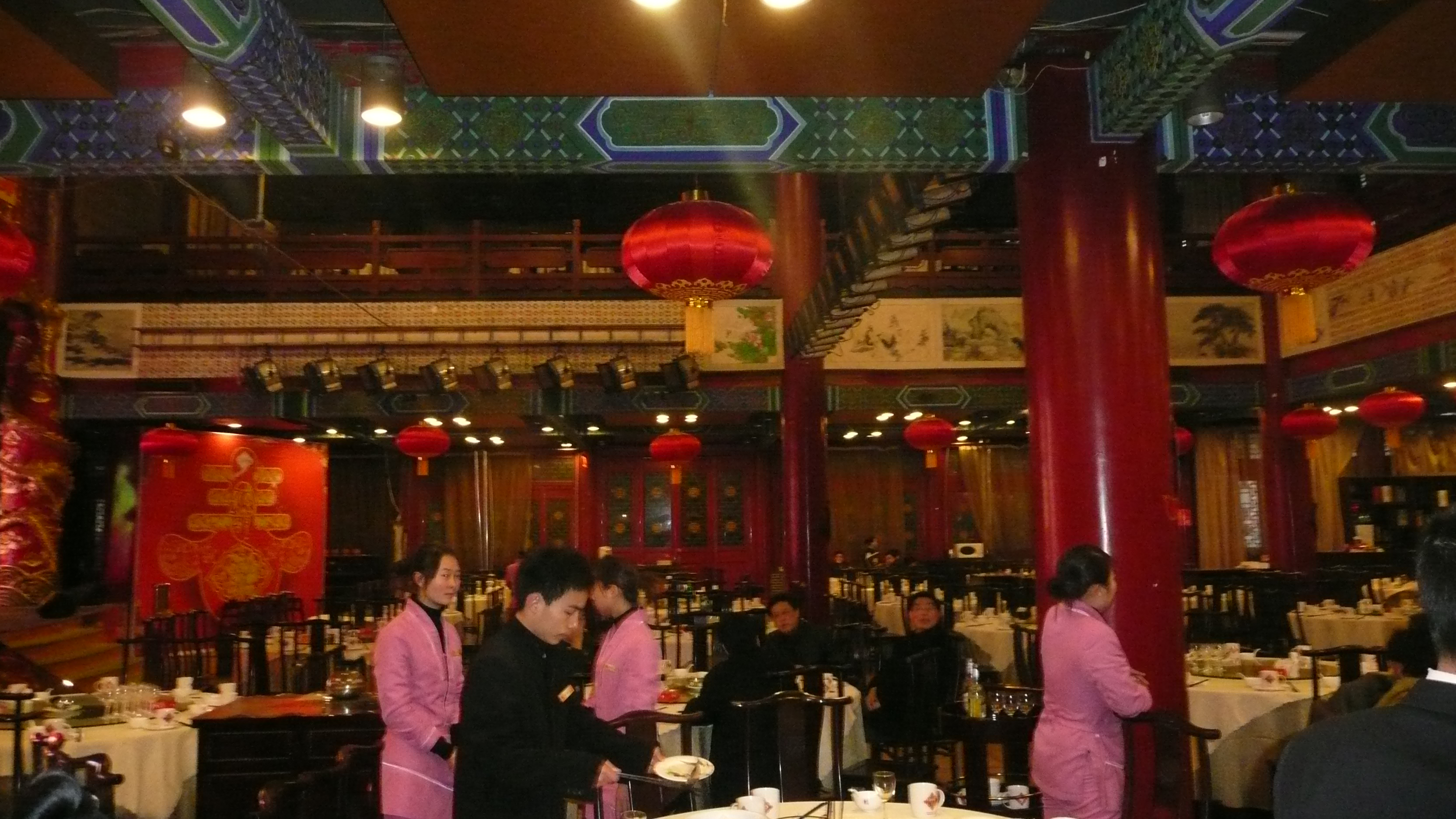
Performance hall

== See also ==
- List of restaurants in China
