= Kong Yiji =

1919 short story by Lu Xun

Kong Yiji-孔乙己
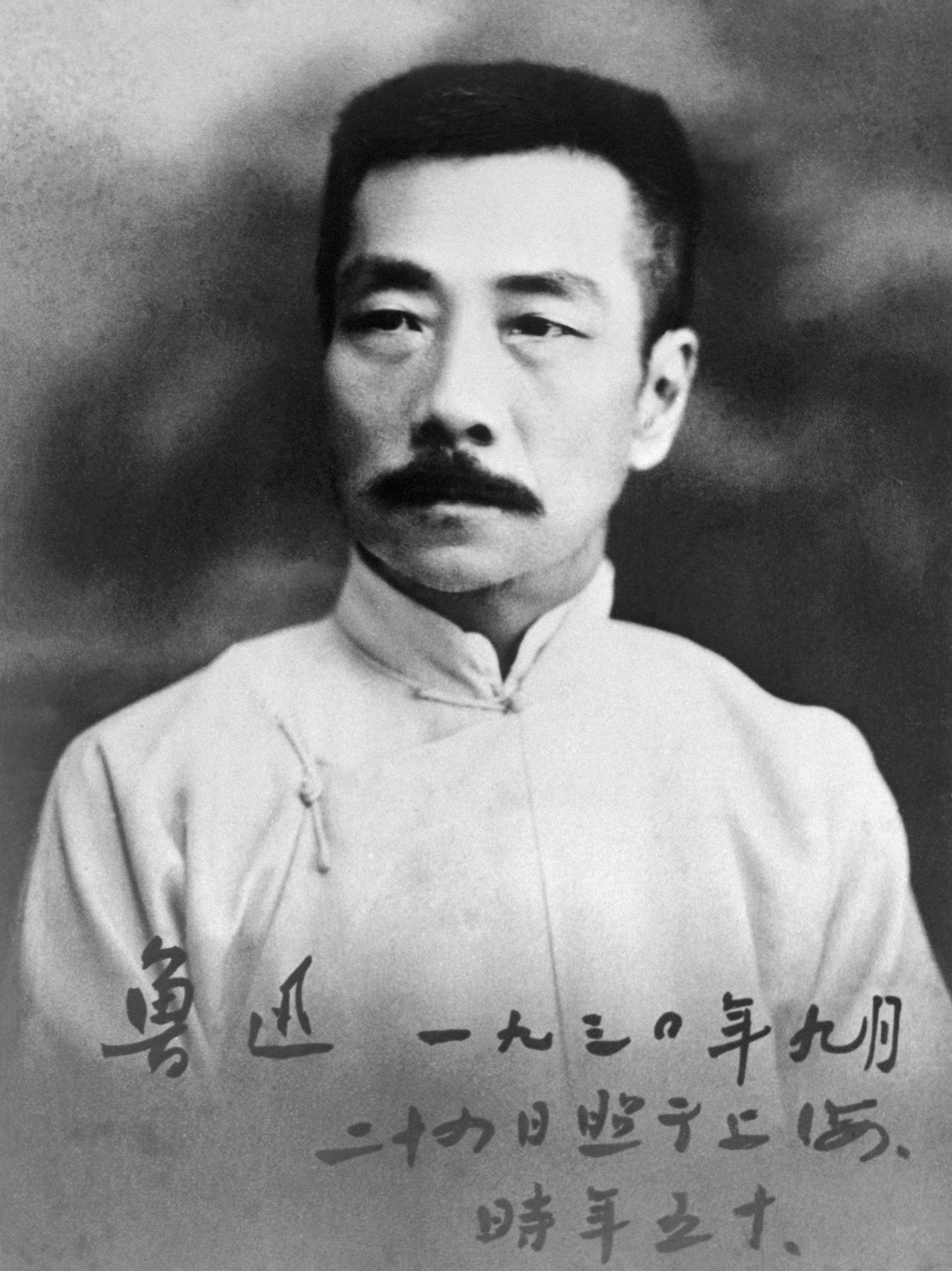
- Lu Xun
- Author: Lu Xun
- Original title: 孔乙己
- Language: Chinese
- Published: April 1919
- Original text: 孔乙己 at Chinese Wikisource
- Translation: Kong Yiji-孔乙己 at Wikisource

Kong Yiji
- Chinese: 孔乙己
Transcriptions
Standard Mandarin
- Hanyu Pinyin: Kǒng Yǐjǐ
- IPA: [kʰʊ̀ŋ ì.tɕì]
Yue: Cantonese
- Yale Romanization: húng yut géi
- Jyutping: hung² jyut³ gei²

"Kong Yiji" (Chinese: 孔乙己; pinyin: Kǒng Yǐjǐ) is a short-story by Lu Xun, a leading figure in modern Chinese literature. The story was originally published in the journal New Youth (Chinese: 新青年) in April 1919 and was later included in Lu Xun's first collection of short stories, Call to Arms (Chinese: 吶喊). The story's narrator reminisces about Kong Yiji, a pedantic scholar who became the laughing-stock of the tavern where the narrator worked. His character embodies the plight of many low-class scholars, who, despite being members of the upper-class, studied the classics for many years but continuously failed to pass the civil service examination. Like Kong Yiji, these scholars were subjected to other people’s indifference and ridicule. The story critiques pre-modern China’s imperial examination system which produced people like Kong Yiji. In March 2023, the song “Happy Sunshine Kong Yiji” was produced by Chinese netizens to satirize the issue of unemployment faced by many Chinese youth. The song, which was based on the story, has been used as a meme by unemployed Chinese youth, who see themselves as modern versions of Kong Yiji.

== Plot ==
The story takes place towards the end of the 19th century, in at the Xianheng Inn in Luzhen (Chinese: 鲁镇), a fictional town where many of Lu Xun’s stories are set. The story’s narrator reminisces about the time he worked in the Xianheng Inn, and his memories of Kong Yiji.

In the story, Xianheng Inn was a social hub where workers went to grab a drink after work. Those who frequented the bar were split into two social groups, identifiable by their clothes. Customers wearing long gowns were of the upper-class and sat down to drink, while those wearing short gowns were of the lower-class and were only able stand and drink outside.

Kong Yiji wore a long gown which was dirty and tattered. Although a member of the upper-class, Kong Yiji drank his wine standing, which contradicted with the social norms of the inn. In the beginning of the story, Kong Yiji is described as tall, with a pale complexion and a shaggy gray beard. He spoke sophisticatedly, and his speech was filled with literary jargon, which others were unable to completely understand. Since his surname was Kong, people gave him a nickname mockingly from the copybooks for calligraphy called Kong Yiji.

As a member of the upper-class, Kong Yiji studied Chinese classics, but due to low acceptance rates, failed to pass the academic examination, thus also failing to obtain an official post. As a result, he could not make a living, so he supported himself by begging, and using his calligraphy skills to copy books for others. However, he liked to drink and had a track record of being lazy. Within a few days, he would disappear, taking books, paper, brushes and inkstone with him, eventually making people reluctant to seek his copying services, and giving him no choice but to steal occasionally. This also led to frequent accusations of theft.

Despite being low on funds, Kong Yiji never failed to pay and even shared his peas flavored with aniseed with the children. When he did not have money ready to pay, his name would be written up on the board which recorded debtors and their debts. When this happened, he would settle his debts within a month and have his name taken off the board.

One day, a few days before the Mid-Autumn Festival, the shopkeeper discovered that Kong Yiji had not come for a long time and owed 19 yuan. A customer stated that he stole other people's things and had his legs broken as a result. After the Mid-Autumn Festival, Kong Yiji reappeared at the Inn and ordered a bowl of warm wine. This time, “His face was haggard and lean, and he looked in a terrible condition. He had on a ragged lined jacket, and was sitting cross-legged on a mat which was attached to his shoulders by a straw rope.” Although he was not able to pay his debt, he paid for his wine that day, promising to pay off the rest later. Upon paying, the narrator notices that “his hands were full of mud. It turned out that he had walked here with this hand. After a while, he finished drinking, sat down and walked slowly with this hand.” This was the last time the narrator saw Kong Yiji, who he eventually presumed to be dead as a result of his injuries.

== Background ==
=== Historical background ===
At the end of the 19th century, the Qing government was corrupt and people were living in poverty. The imperial examination system that had been in place since the Sui and Tang dynasties still prevailed. Scholars who passed the exams were awarded government office, but they were few in number. Many who failed the exams were left poor and destitute. Kong Yiji was a typical example of those who studied the classics for most of their lives but failed the exams.

After the Xinhai Revolution in 1911, Yuan Shikai attempted to become emperor. The restoration forces were rampant, and the results of the revolution were stolen. During the late Qing reforms of 1905, the imperial examination system was abolished, but traditional culture and education were still deeply rooted.

The October Revolution occurred in 1917. Chinese revolutionary intellectuals such as Li Dazhao initiated the New Culture Movement and mounted a fierce attack on Confucian culture and education. Lu Xun was a powerful voice in this movement to crush Confucian culture, and to "depict a life or a life in society for readers to see".

=== Creation background ===
"Kong Yiji" was written in the winter of 1918, when the New Youth unveiled the prelude to the New Cultural Movement, but the counter-current of retrogression was still rampant. Although the imperial examination system was abolished in 1906, the social foundation for cultivating people like Kong Yiji still existed. Confucius and Mencius were still the core elements of social education. To arouse the young generation, Lu Xun created a set of the Xianheng Tavern in Luzhen and artistically showed the lives of poor intellectuals in society more than 20 years ago. He aimed to inspire readers to think about the social situation and criticize the imperial examination system. When publishing “Kong Yiji”， Lu Xun said in the afterword:

“This very clumsy novel was made last winter. At that time, the meaning was merely to describe society or a kind of life, that I invited readers to see. There was no other profound meaning. However, [...] some people suddenly used the story to make personal attacks. Generally, when an author goes down a dark road, they often lead the reader to fall into deep thought with them: thinking that short-stories are an instrument used to spill dirty water, and those who are spoiled in it. This is a very sad and pitiful thing. Therefore, I declare this, so that there should be no speculations made which harms the reader’s integrity”

The original intention of Lu Xun's novels was to encourage people to reflect on and critique the social reality and the sub-standard living conditions of ordinary people under the imperial examination system. Lu Xun also opposed to using novels to make personal attacks. He hoped that through his fictional descriptions of social reality, he would encourage people to reflect and criticize China’s feudal culture and imperial examination system.

== Character features ==
Kong Yiji lived during the transition period between the old and new Chinese societies, which gave his character a contradictory duality. Kong Yiji is part of the upper-class, but is poor. He is kind and honest, but also pedantic and stubborn. Kong Yiji is a tragic figure whose character features make readers mourn his misfortune and anger for his cowardice.

=== The lower-class of the educated upper-class ===
The story divides the customers of Xianheng Inn into two groups:

1. Customers wearing long gowns: upper-class people who sit down to drink.
2. Customers wearing short gowns: lower-class people who can only stand and drink outside.

Kong Yiji is a long-gown man who drinks his wine standing, which seems to be quite contradictory to the status-quo.

The archaism in Kong Yiji's speech and the long gown show that Kong Yiji is a scholar, who should be considered as part of the upper class. However, Kong Yiji's long gown is tattered, and he is ridiculed by others. Even the nickname "Kong Yiji" has become his official name. This character feature reflects the miserable fate of a lower-class scholar in the old society. It is also representative of how the imperial examination system created people like Kong Yiji.

=== Poor but never defaulted ===
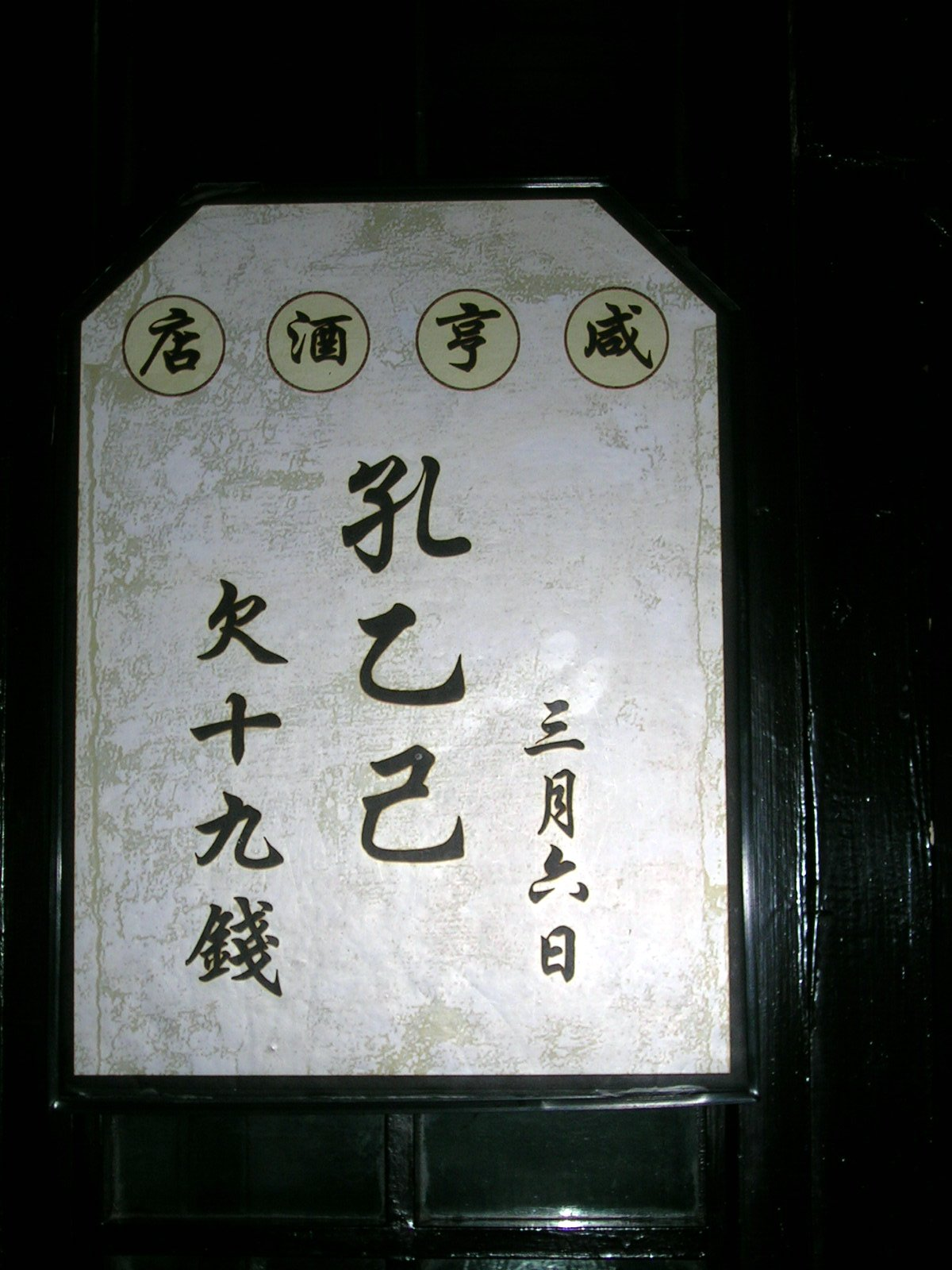
the board in Xianheng Tavern which wrote that Kong Yiji defaulted money on March 6th

Kong Yiji was a scholar who did not pass the imperial examination. As a result, he became penniless, and had to beg for food, as he was unable to make a living. This shows how Kong Yiji was deeply influenced by the imperial examination system. Although he had become a laughingstock, he still believed that only those who studied could enter the upper class. Even though he failed to pass the Xiucai examination and was reduced to begging for a living, he still despised labor and put on the air of a scholar.

Kong Yiji had good handwriting. He copied books by hand to earn money and buy some food. However, he is known for being lazy and gluttonous. After accepting a job, it did not take him long to disappear with all his books, paper, pen, and ink. Since this happened several times, people no longer wanted to ask him to transcribe books. With no other options, Kong Yiji resorted to theft to sustain himself. However, within the community at the Xianheng Inn, his behavior was better than some other people's because he never defaulted on his debt. Although his name sometimes appeared on the debt board when he had no cash to pay his bill upfront, he would always pay off his debt within a month. Although Kong Yiji was deeply influenced by the pedantic Imperial Examination system, he still retained honesty as a traditional virtue.

=== Honest and kind ===
In the story, Kong Yiji is patient and willing to teach other people, exemplified by his testing of the narrator in writing hui in hui-xiang( Chinese:茴香; translation: aniseed/fennel) peas. Although Kong Yiji was made fun of by people and was at the bottom of the social ladder, he was still kind to the children around him. He was so poor that he did not have much money to buy aniseed peas, but he was still willing to share them with the children.

=== A Dignified Thief ===
Throughout the story Kong Yiji is accused of stealing on many occasions. However, as an educated individual of the upper-class he defends himself and denies the allegations to keep his integrity even in poverty. Although Kong Yiji prides himself on being a scholar and has dignity, he steals books. It is the greatest contradiction in this character. Since he believes that scholars are more noble than others, he does not admit that stealing books is theft, reflecting his pedantry and absurdity. It is also the main reason for his tragedy in the end, when his legs are broken after attempting to steal from a scholar.

== Prototype ==
There are many different versions of the prototype of Kong Yiji in folklore. Three of the most famous and evidence-based versions are Meng Fuzi, Siqi, and Mr. Yiran.

=== Meng Fuzi ===
According to Mr. Lu Xun, there is indeed such a person, surnamed Meng, who often drinks at the Xianheng Tavern and is called "Meng Fuzi". His behavior is similar to what describes in Kong Yiji.

Meng Fuzi’s real name was lost. He had studied but finally did not enter college. He did not know how to make a living, so he was poor and could only beg for food. He copied books for others, but he liked to drink, and sometimes he even sold his books, paper, and pencils for drinking. When he was poor, he went into the school to steal something, but he was caught, saying that it was "stealing" books and could not be considered stealing. He often came to the Xianheng Tavern to drink wine and probably lived near the place, but no one knew it. After breaking his legs, he used two hands to support the walk and came to the tavern to drink. However, after that, nobody has ever seen him.

=== Siqi ===
The prototype of Kong Yiji is called “Siqi”. The man was addicted to drinking and opium, but he had good handwriting. He often wandered around wearing a shabby and ragged gown and a skull cap on his head. He liked to swear and abuse and was often beaten by people.

=== Mr. Yiran ===
According to legend, there was a person named "Mr. Yiran" in Shaoxing City. This person was living in poverty. To make a living, he could only sell breakfast to barely getting by. As he refused to take off his long gown and did not want to hawk aloud, he had to follow other vendors selling breakfast. The hawkers shouted once, and he followed behind with a low voice of "Yiran" (Chinese: 亦然, an archaism meaning “me too”), which was ridiculous. When the children on the street saw him wearing a long gown, carrying a basket, and mumbling words they did not understand, they gathered around and laughed, calling him "Mr. Yiran”. Since then, "Mr. Yiran" has become famous in Shaoxing City.

"After selling breakfast, Mr. Yiran slowly paced to Xianheng Tavern, taking out a few coins and asking for a bowl of wine and a plate of fennel peas, and slowly drank while chewing the fennel peas with great relish. When the children saw "Mr. Yiran" drinking, they rushed to ask for fennel peas to eat. He gave one to each child until very few fennel peas were left on the plate, then covered the plate with his hand and chanted, "Not many. Not too many."

It is said that this "Mr. Yiran" is the prototype of Kong Yiji in Lu Xun’s story.

== Social significance ==
=== Criticism of old society and imperial examination ===
The tragedy of Kong Yiji embodies the destruction of intellectuals by the old society and ideology. In the history of Chinese old society, the ruling class set up the imperial examination system to manage scholars and instill the idea of "learning is second to none". As a result, many people staked their fate on the imperial examinations and wasted a lot of time, but still lived in poverty. Kong Yiji is the epitome of the intellectuals in the lower class. This character shows the psychological state and tragic end of such scholars. Lu Xun uses this character to illustrate the decadence of people educated by the imperial examination system and the tragedy of Chinese intellectuals in the late Qing Dynasty.

=== Reflection of the indifference between people ===
The misfortune of Kong Yiji was not an isolated case but a common phenomenon in the old society. The ridicule of the customers in the Xianheng Tavern further led to the tragedy of the times. People made fun of the lower-class intellectuals to gain temporary satisfaction and pleasure without sympathy for their miserable situations. The suffering of those people has become derision for others. Lu Xun uses the character to reflect the indifference of society and the numbness of people's minds. Under feudal rule, the people at the bottom were also oppressed. No one would pity Kong Yiji, but would seek happiness through ridiculing him. This is the pathology of society and the pathology of feudal rule.

=== “Happy Sunshine Kong Yiji” ===
Kong Yiji was a victim to decadent feudal ideas and its imperial examination system. He was mentally pedantic and insensitive, and lived in poverty. He spent his days in people's ridicule and banter, and was finally swallowed up by the feudal landlord class.

In March 2023, Chinese netizens produced the song "Happy Sunshine Kong Yiji". It became popular overnight and resonated because young people compared themselves to Kong Yiji and compared their academic qualifications to Kong Yiji’s “long gown.” In today's society, Chinese youth continue to work hard to excel academically, but despite their efforts, it is difficult for them to find a high-paying and decent job. Their helpless situation stems from China's education system which pushes all students to compete with each other starting in childhood, forcing them to learn in a high pressure environment, but with no reward. As a result, many Chinese youth empathized with Kong Yiji, and see themselves as modern Kong Yiji.

== See also ==
- Unemployment in China
- Education in China

== References and further reading ==
- Lu, Xun, Editor: Kevin Nadolny, Illustrations by Baidi and Gege. Short Stories from Lǔ Xùn's Nàhǎn. Capturing Chinese, July 1, 2009. ISBN 0984276203, 9780984276202.
- Lee, Leo Ou-fan (1987). Voices from the Iron House: A Study of Lu Xun. Bloomington: Indiana University Press. ISBN 0253362636.
- Lu Xun (2009). The Real Story of Ah-Q and Other Tales of China: The Complete Fiction of Lu Xun. translated by Julia Lovell. London; New York: Penguin. ISBN 9780140455489., pp. 32-36.
- Marxists Internet Archive (2005). https://www.marxists.org/archive/lu-xun/1919/03/x01.htm.
