= Xian Heng Inn =

Restaurant in Shaoxing, China

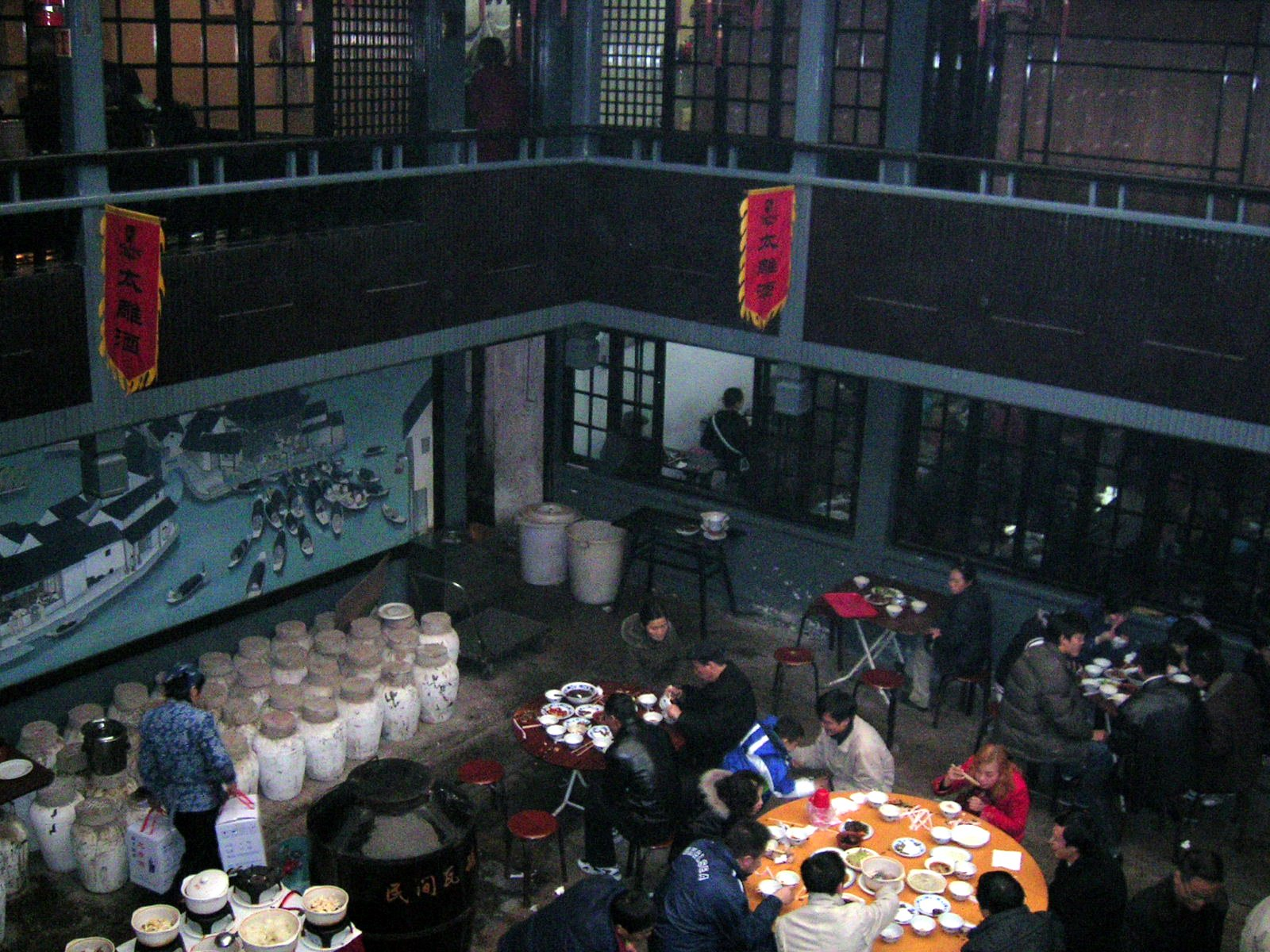
- Notice the kegs of Shaoxing wine left of image
- Traditional Chinese: 咸亨酒店
- Simplified Chinese: 咸亨酒店
Transcriptions
Standard Mandarin
- Hanyu Pinyin: xian2 heng1 jiu3 dian4
Yue: Cantonese
- Jyutping: haam4 hang1 zau2 dim3

Xian Heng Inn, Xian Heng Tavern or Xian Heng Hotel is a historic Chinese cuisine restaurant located in Shaoxing, Zhejiang province, People's Republic of China.

== History ==
The original restaurant was founded in 1884, during the reign of the Guangxu Emperor of the Qing dynasty, but closed after a few years.

It was mentioned by writer Lu Xun in his work "Kong Yiji", with the restaurant situated in a fictionalised version of Shaoxing.

The modern inn opened to the public on September 18, 1981, to commemorate the 100th anniversary of Lu Xun's birthday.

The restaurant is known for maintaining the classic Shaoxing wine tradition that has been around since the dynastic times. It should not be confused as a possible birthplace of the wine since that had been around for many dynasties before the restaurant.

== See also ==
- Bianyifang
- Quanjude
