= China Time-honored Brand =

Title granted to traditional enterprises in China

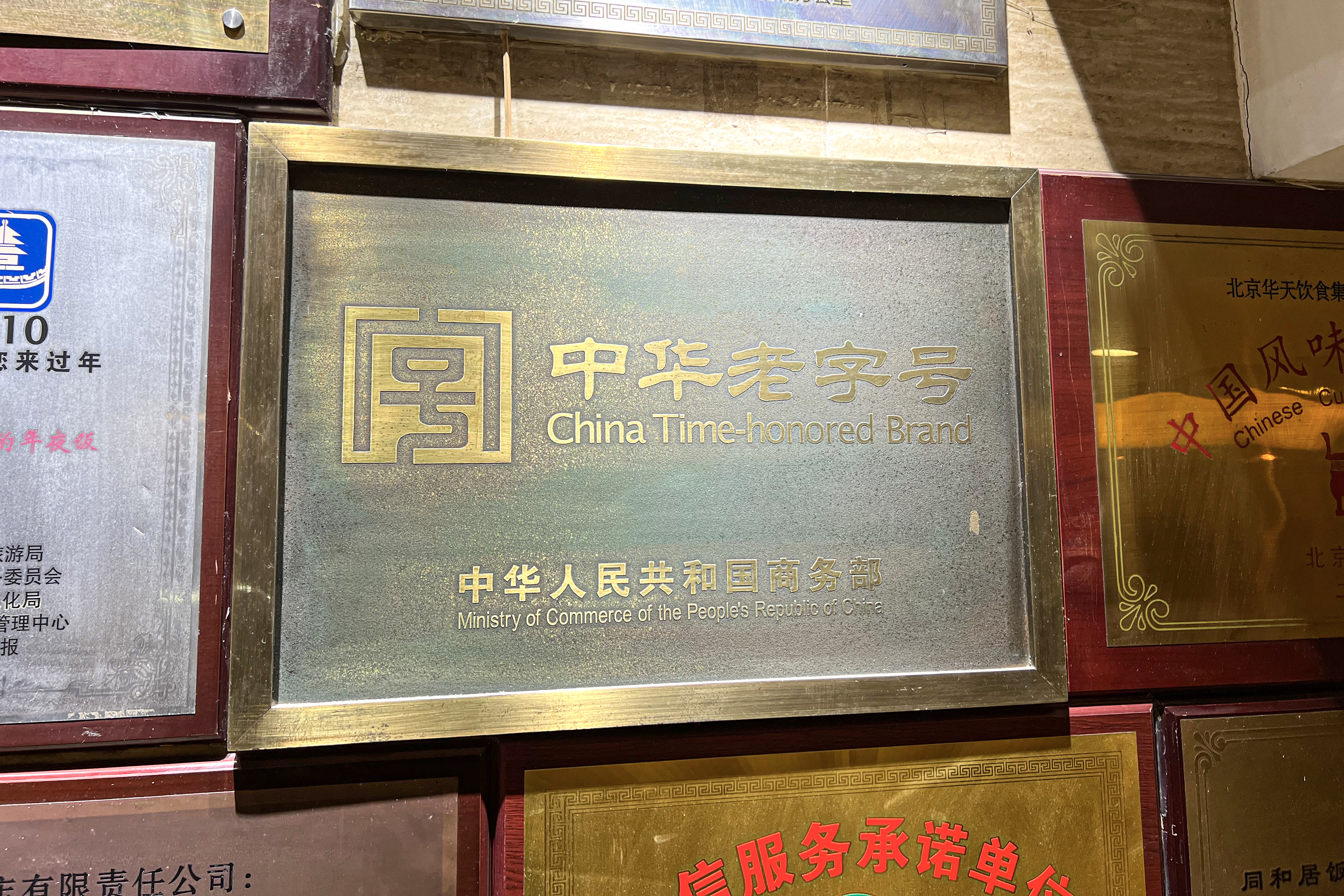
Plaque of China Time-honored Brand issued by the Ministry of Commerce of the People's Republic of China

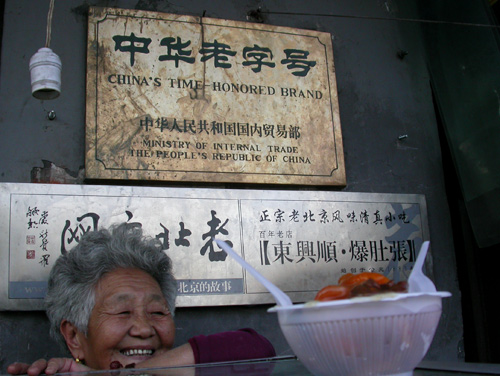
A Lao Zihao in Houhai.

China Time-honored Brand (Chinese: Zhōnghuá lǎo zìhào 中华老字号 or simply lǎo zìhào 老字号) is a title granted by the Ministry of Commerce of the People's Republic of China to Chinese enterprises that existed before 1956, sell products, techniques or services passed down through generations, have distinct Chinese cultural characteristics, and are widely recognized by society.

This title was first granted soon after the foundation of the PRC in 1949. The current eligibility criteria were set in 2006, when the Ministry of Commerce revised them for the last time.

There are currently around 1,000 brands granted this title, among which are Tongrentang (traditional Chinese medicine), Quanjude (Peking Duck), Laobian Dumpling (dumplings), and Go Believe (baozi or steamed dumpling). Many of the shops have a history of over 400 years, and in modern times have begun to expand via mass commercialization of their products.

== Notable Beijing Lao Zihao ==
Quanjude 全聚德 — Peking duck restaurant
Laobian Dumpling 老边饺子 — dumpling restaurant and traditional dumpling-making method.
Douyichu 都一处 — restaurant famous for its shaomai
Bianyifang 便宜坊 — another Peking duck restaurant
Goubuli 狗不理 — baozi restaurant (founded in Tianjin, a city near Beijing)
Hundun hou 馄饨侯 — wonton (hundun) restaurant
Liubiju 六必居 — sells preserved vegetables and sauces
Rongbaozhai 荣宝斋 — sells works of art (notably wall scrolls)
Tongrentang 同仁堂 — supplier of medicinal herbs used in Traditional Chinese Medicine
Zhang Yiyuan 张一元 — teahouse
Ruifuxiang 瑞蚨祥 — silk clothing and qipaos
Neiliansheng 内联升 — old Chinese cloth shoes
Shengxifu 盛锡福 — hats

== Works cited ==
- van der Meulen, Bernd; Sun, Juanjuan; Carvajal, Ricardo; Kite, Jonathon; Costa Diaz, Thiago (2016), "Food Safety Regulations Applied to Traditional and Ethnic Foods", in Prakash, Vishweshwaraiah; Martìn-Belloso, Olga; Keener, Larry; Astley, Siân; Braun, Susanne; McMahon, Helena; Lelieveld, Huub (eds.), Regulating Safety of Traditional and Ethnic Foods, Amsterdam: Elsevier, pp. 441–466, ISBN 978-0-12-800605-4
- Forêt, Philippe; Mazzalovo, Gérald (2014), "The Long March of the Chinese Luxury Industry towards Globalization: Questioning the Relevance of the "China Time-honored Brand" Label", Luxury, 1 (1): 133–153, doi:10.2752/205118174X14066464962599 (inactive 11 July 2025)

== See also ==
- Economy of China
- Economic history of China (Pre-1911)
- Economic history of China (1912–1949)
