= Lou Wai Lou =

Traditional restaurant in Hangzhou, Zhejiang, China

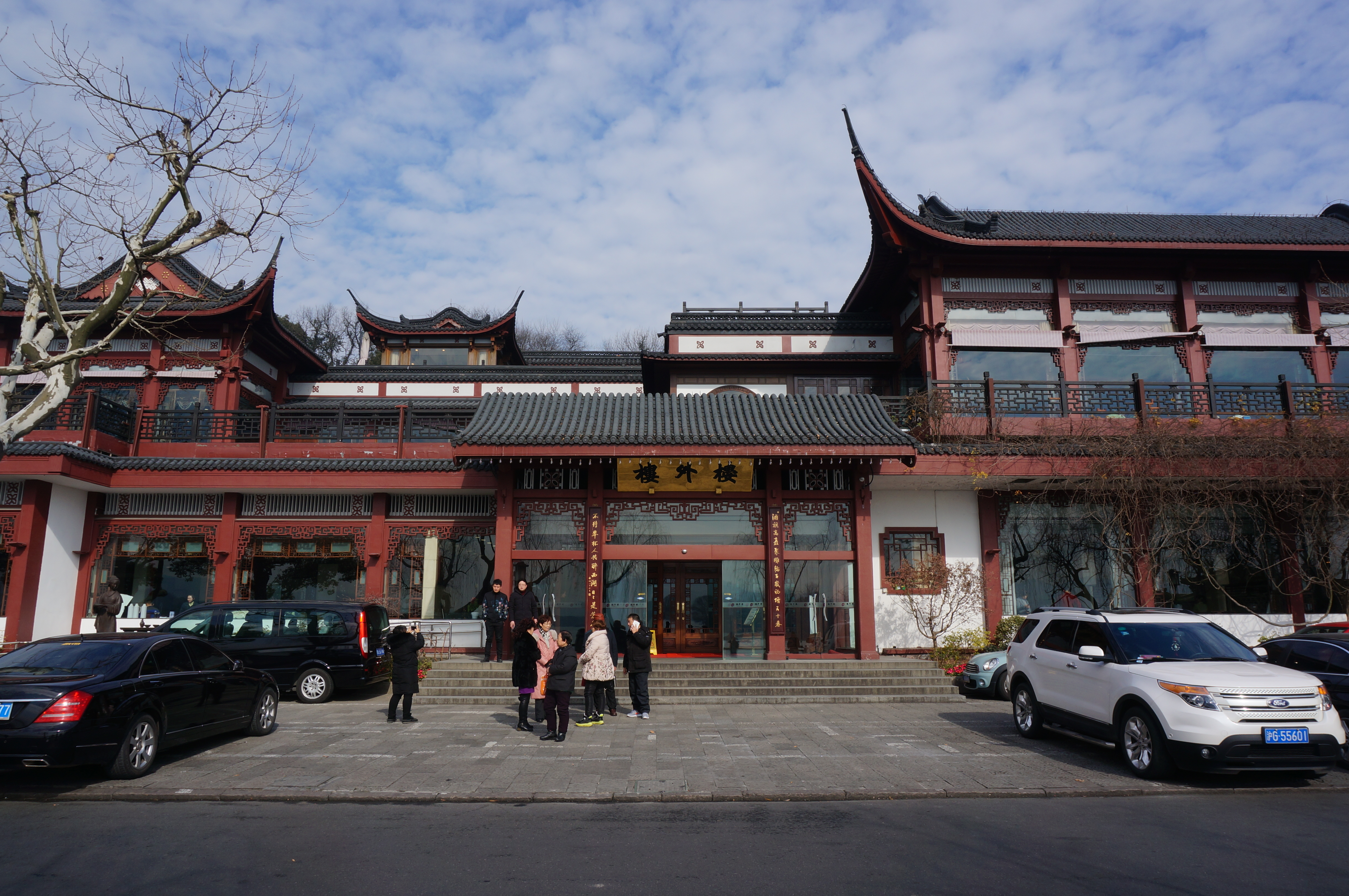
Lou Wai Lou restaurant

Lou Wai Lou (Chinese: 楼外楼) is a traditional restaurant in Hangzhou, Zhejiang, China, located on Gushan in the middle of the West Lake. It was established in the 28th year of the reign of Emperor Daoguang of the Qing dynasty (1848). It has been named a "China Time-honored Brand" by the Chinese government.

== History ==
The founder of Lou Wai Lou was a man from Shaoxing, named Hong Ruitang. After moving to Hangzhou, he set up a base of operations on Gushan Road, vending fresh fish and seafood. After opportunities arrived, he started a full restaurant in the same location.

The modern Lou Wai Lou restaurant was established in 1980, dubbed one of Hangzhou's "ten establishments". Later, Lou Wai Lou opened another location not far from the original called Shan Wai Shan. In 2012, the restaurant was owned by Shen Guanzhong.

Lou Wai Lou has been described as a world famous restaurant and the most famous restaurant in Hangzhou. The restaurant has been named a "China Time-honored Brand" by the Chinese government.

== Notable diners ==
Before 1949, Wu Changshuo, Sun Zhongshan, Soong Ching-ling, Lu Xun, Zhu Kezhen, and Yu Dafu had all dined at Lou Wai Lou. After 1949, the state leaders Zhou Enlai, Chen Yi, and He Long, and the celebrities Feng Zikai, Pan Tianshou, Zhao Puchu, and Jin Yong had all dined at Lou Wai Lou.

== Notable menu items ==
- West Lake vinegar fish
- Lady Song's fish soup
- Longjing shrimp
- Beggar's Chicken
- Mizhihuofang
- Dongpo pork
- Crab roe oranges
- Turtle broiled lamb
- West Lake vegetable soup

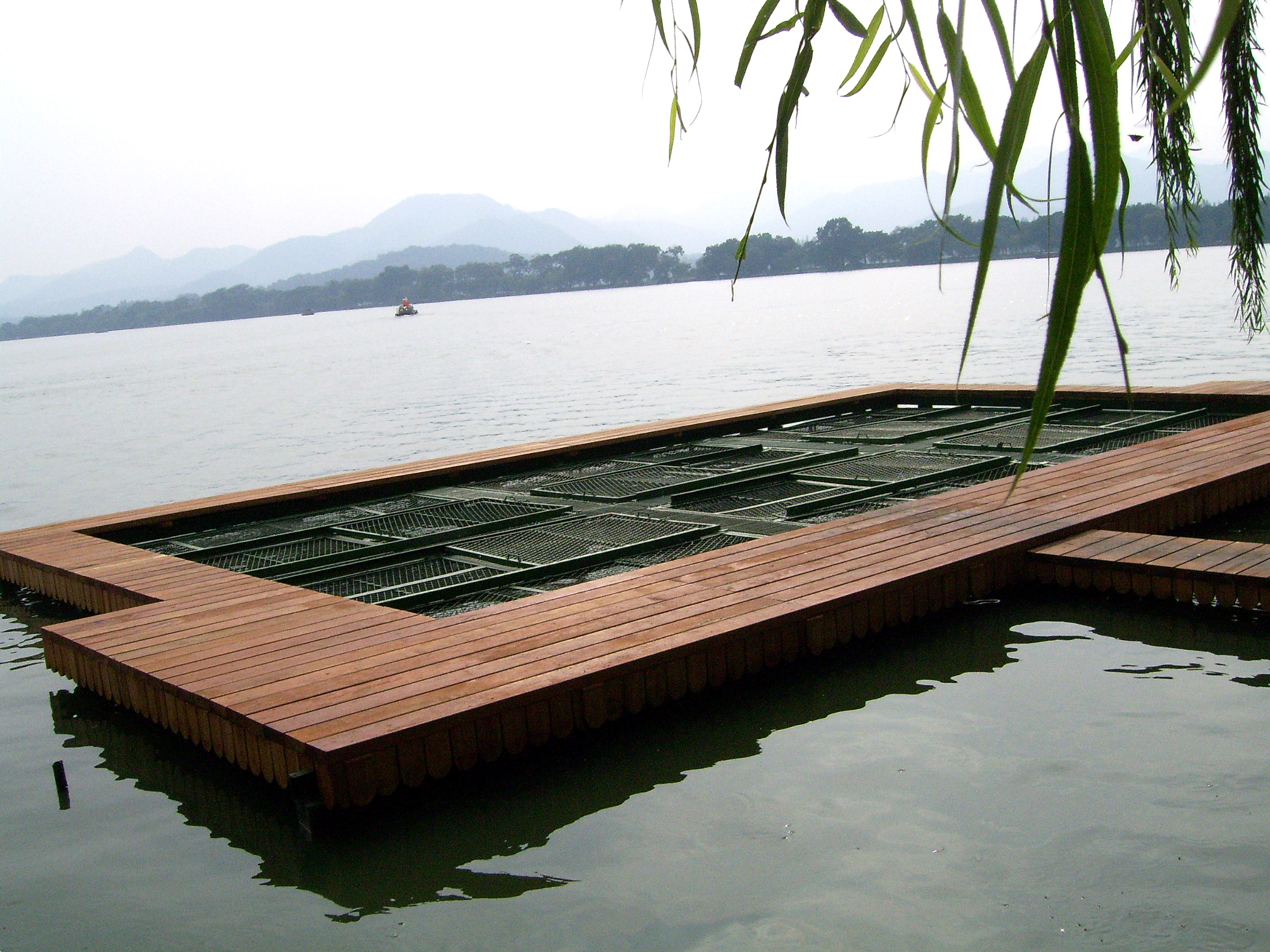
A fishing spot near the restaurant
