= Sweet and sour pork =

Chinese dish consisting of fried pork tenders with sweet and sour sauce

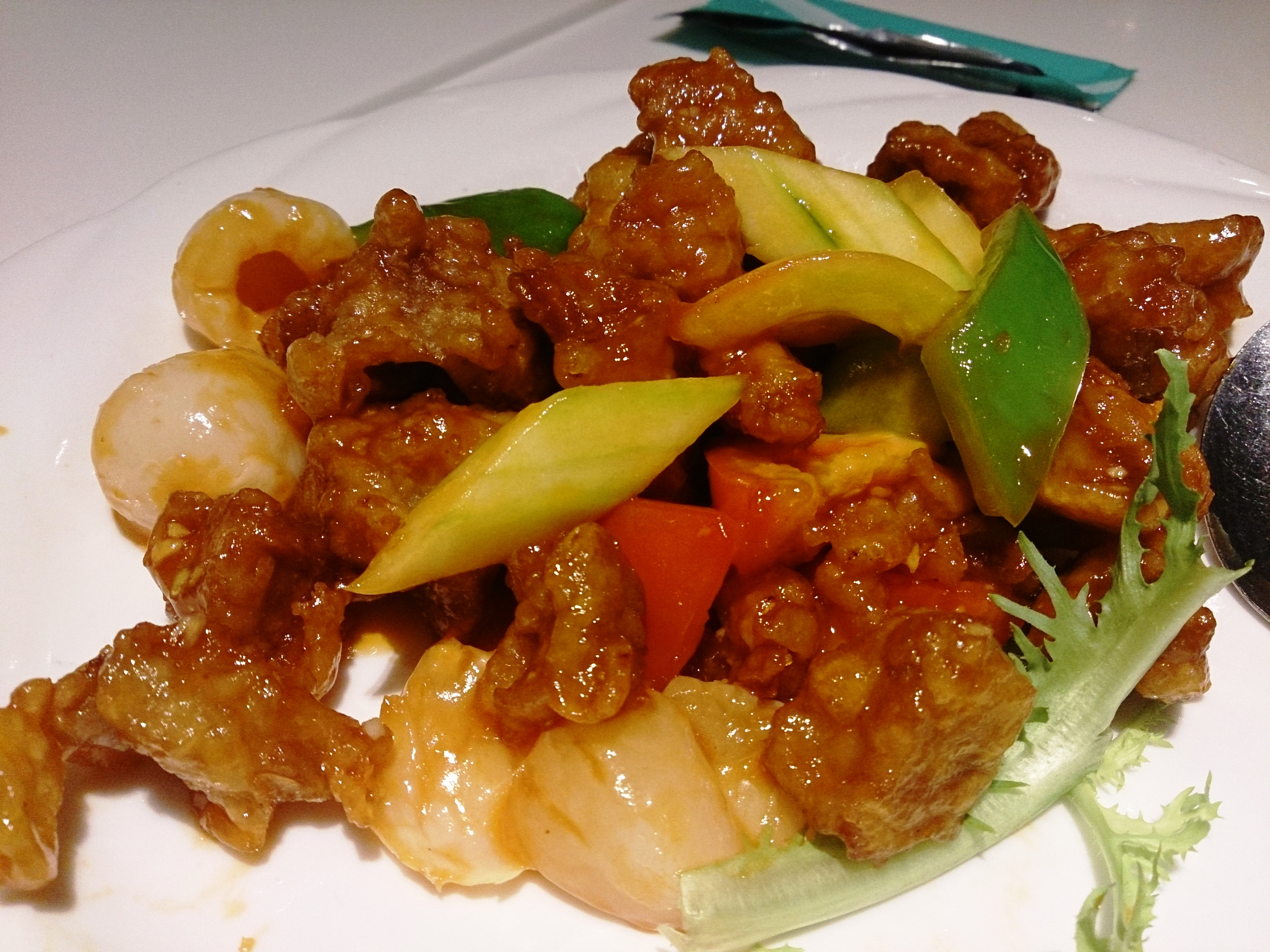
- Sweet and sour pork with vegetables
- Alternative names: Gu lou juk, gu lu rou
- Place of origin: China
- Region or state: Guangdong
- Associated cuisine: Cantonese cuisine
- Main ingredients: Pork, vegetables, pineapple, sweet and sour sauce
- Variations: Subuta, tangsuyuk, guo bao rou

Sweet and sour pork (Chinese: 咕嚕肉; pinyin: gūlāoròu; Cantonese Yale: gū lōu yuhk) is a Cantonese and Chinese-American dish consisting of fried pork tenders with sweet and sour sauce. It is usually served with vegetables, and sometimes with pineapple. The dish originated from Cantonese cuisine in the 18th century. It became popular in the United States after Chinese immigrants came to the US to work on railroads in the early 20th century.

== Etymology ==
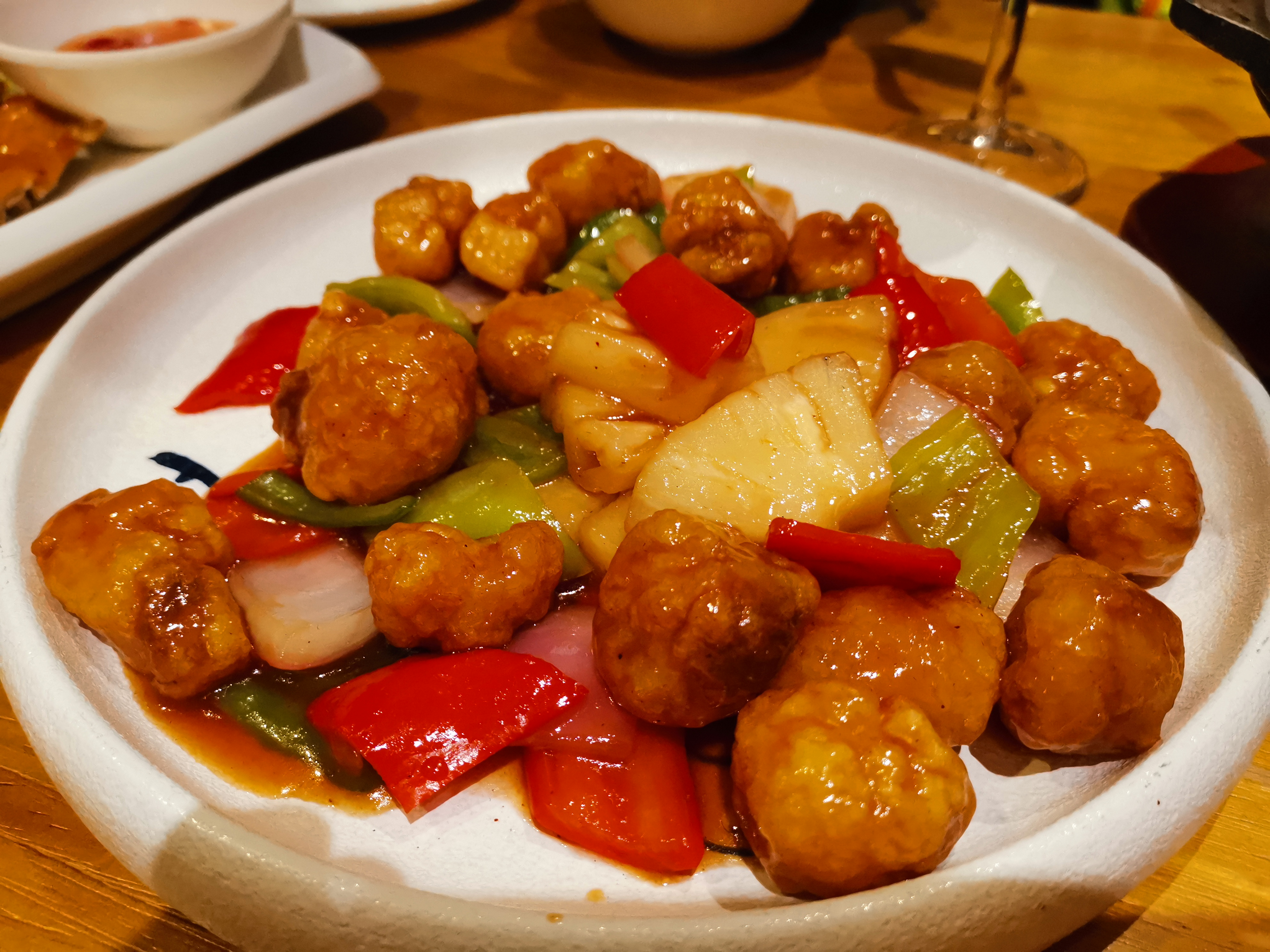
Sweet and sour pork with bell peppers and pineapple

The Cantonese word gu lou (咕嚕) is an onomatopoeia meaning a gulping or swallowing sound. Juk (肉) means "meat". Together, gu lou juk means meat that makes people salivate or "gulp and swallow". In Mandarin, the word is pronounced gu lu rou, with the same meaning.

Another theory is that the name is derived from gu lao rou, which means "ancient meat", referring to the dish's long history.

== History ==
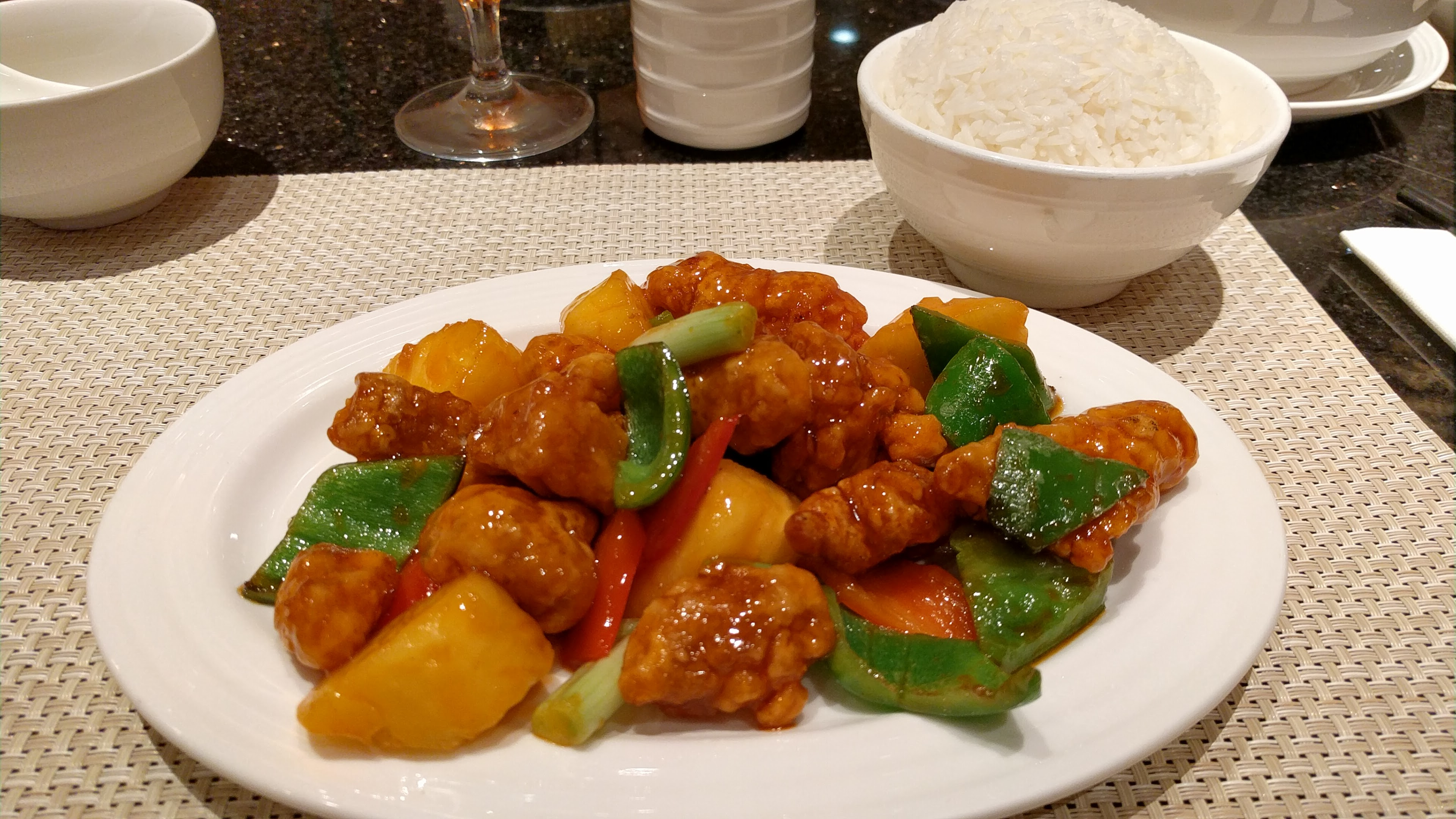
In Macau

This dish became popular because it fits the taste of foreigners living in Guangdong. Since Europeans and Americans contacted the Guangdong area first during the Qing Dynasty, the dish became popular among them. Moreover, the Guangdong people were the first ones to immigrate to the United States. As a result, as they began to open Cantonese restaurants, the dish became viral both in China and internationally. This dish also became a symbol of cultural identity for Chinese immigrants in America, reflecting both adaptation to local tastes and the preservation of heritage cuisine.

During the early Chinese migration wave (mid‑19th century California Gold Rush and railroad construction), sweet and sour pork became a staple in Chinese American restaurants, often viewed as emblematic of adaptation to Western palates. The dish has been described as an “ultimate unifier”, bridging cultural divides and reflecting immigrant resilience.

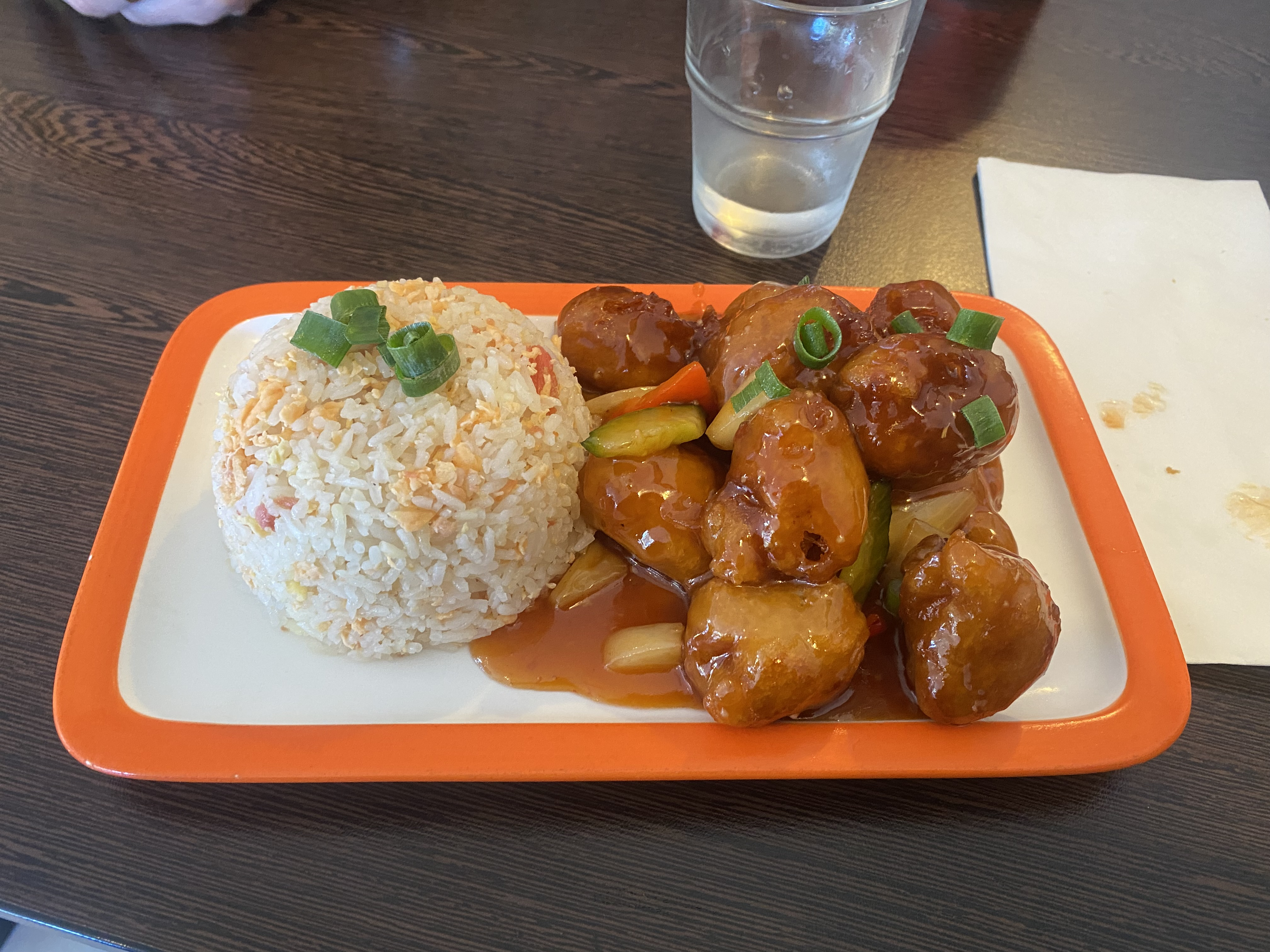
Served with rice

According to Vice Media, the dish is often misunderstood to be "inauthentic, cheap, westernized" because it was developed to please western palates. Lucas Sin argues that "Chinese American food is authentic to a different type of immigrant experience, a different style of cooking. It’s an important segment of history".

== Ingredients, preparation and serving ==
=== Ingredients ===
Sweet and sour pork is primarily made with pork, commonly from the shoulder or loin, due to their balance of tenderness and fat content. The meat is cut into bite-sized chunks and often marinated in soy sauce, rice wine, or light seasoning before frying. A batter mixture—typically made from flour, cornstarch, water, and sometimes egg—is used to coat the pork before deep-frying.

The sweet and sour sauce usually consists of a blend of rice vinegar, sugar, tomato ketchup or paste, and soy sauce. Garlic, ginger, and pineapple juice may also be added to enhance the aroma and taste. Common vegetables included in the dish are bell peppers, onions, carrots, celery, and occasionally pineapple chunks or spring onions.

=== Preparation ===
The pork is first marinated, then coated in batter and deep-fried until golden and crisp. In some variations, the pork may be fried twice to achieve a crunchier texture. While the pork is frying, a sauce is prepared by combining the sweet and sour components and heating until thickened. Vegetables are either stir-fried separately or simmered briefly in the sauce to maintain a slight crunch.

Once the sauce reaches the desired consistency, the fried pork pieces are added and quickly tossed in the sauce to ensure even coating while retaining their crisp texture.

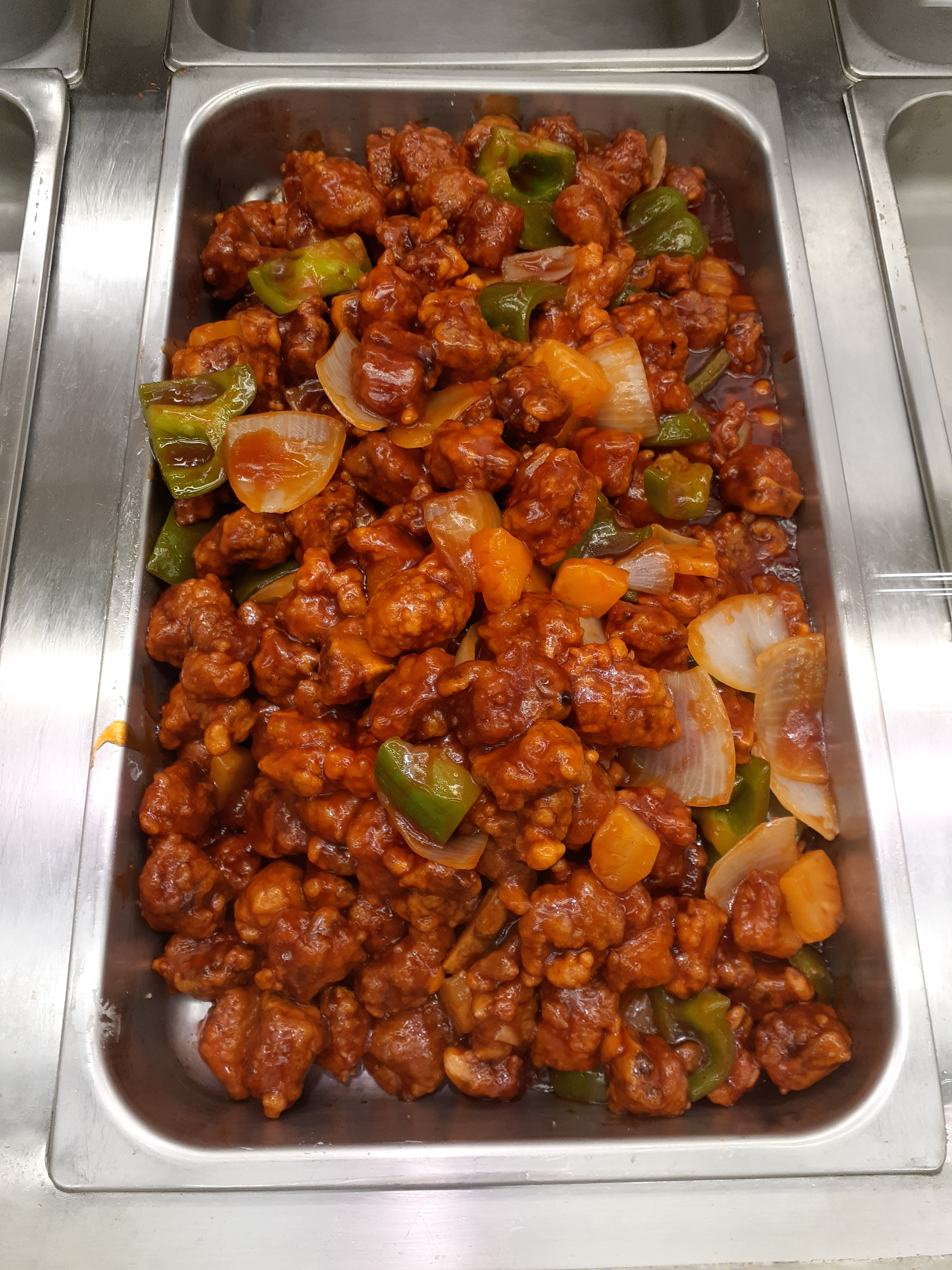
Served at a Wellcome supermarket in Hong Kong

==== Preparation and cooking techniques ====
Traditional preparation of sweet and sour pork often involves specific cooking methods aimed at enhancing texture and flavor. A common technique in Cantonese cuisine is **double-frying** the pork pieces. The first fry, at a lower temperature (around 160 °C), cooks the meat through, while the second fry, at a higher temperature (about 190 °C), crisps the exterior, allowing the pork to maintain its crunch after being coated with sauce.

Vegetables such as bell peppers, onions, and pineapple are typically stir-fried briefly over high heat to preserve their color, texture, and nutritional value. The sauce is added last and simmered briefly with the pork and vegetables to ensure even coating without overcooking.

In some modern or fast-food versions, these steps may be simplified, with pork fried once and pre-made sauces used for convenience. However, traditional recipes emphasize fresh ingredients and precise temperature control to achieve the ideal contrast between crispy meat and glossy, tangy sauce.

==== Sauce ====
Historically, sweet and sour pork sauce was made from Chinese red vinegar (often derived from haw berries) and brown sugar. Contemporary versions commonly use tomato ketchup, pineapple or orange juice, or fruit jam–vinaigrettes to achieve a glossy red color and balanced flavor.

=== Serving ===
Sweet and sour pork is commonly served as a main dish, either as part of a Chinese multi-course meal or as a single-entrée dish in Western-style Chinese cuisine. It is frequently accompanied by steamed white rice. In Chinese banquet settings, the dish is often presented among several other shared dishes.

Western versions of the dish, particularly in Chinese-American or Chinese-British takeout cuisine, tend to emphasize sweetness and may feature a thicker red sauce with a higher ratio of sugar and ketchup. Pineapple is more commonly used in Western adaptations for added sweetness and color.

== Nutrition and health considerations ==
Sweet and sour pork is a calorie-dense dish due to deep-fried pork coated in a sugar-rich sauce. A typical 200-gram serving contains 500–700 kcal, depending on the pork cut, frying method, and sauce amount. Western versions often have higher sugar and sodium from added ketchup and sweeteners.

Healthier adaptations use leaner pork, reduce sugar and salt, or replace frying with baking or air frying to lower fat and calories.

According to the USDA standardized recipe for schools, a ¾-cup (180 ml) serving contains about 201 kcal, 7 g fat (2 g saturated), 405 mg sodium, 22 g carbohydrates (16 g sugars), and 12 g protein.

Nutritionist lists a restaurant portion (609 g) at approximately 1,644 kcal, 72 g fat, and 122 g sugars.

== Outside of China ==
In Japan, the dish is called subuta (酢豚), which translates to "vinegar pork". It is typically prepared with pork, bell peppers, onions, and a sweet-sour sauce based on rice vinegar and sugar.

In South Korea, a similar dish known as tangsuyuk (탕수육) is popular. Tangsuyuk consists of deep-fried pork (or beef) with a tangy sauce made from vinegar, sugar, and fruit or vegetables. The dish has become a staple in Korean-Chinese restaurants across the country. However, it is based on a Northeastern Chinese cuisine guo bao rou instead of Cantonese gu lu rou.

In Singapore, sweet and sour pork is a common dish found in both hawker centres and Chinese restaurants. It is frequently served in zi char eateries, Chinese economical‑rice stalls, and home kitchens. Pineapple is often included for extra sweetness and color, and some versions—especially festive or New Year recipes—also incorporate lychee or plum as a tropical fruit variation.

In Malaysia, the dish is known as ku lo yuk (咕噜肉) and is commonly served at Chinese banquet-style meals. Home-style recipes typically use a cornstarch-based batter and a sauce that is tangier and slightly spicier than many Western variants, balancing ketchup with rice vinegar and chili elements.

In Thailand, sweet and sour pork is sometimes given a local twist by using sweet chili sauce or tamarind-based sauces combined with fish sauce and Thai chili, reflecting a blend of Chinese cooking techniques and Thai flavor profiles.

In the United Kingdom, sweet and sour pork is a popular takeaway item. It is typically battered, deep-fried, and served in a thick red sauce with vegetables such as bell peppers and onions, following the pattern of Western Chinese cuisine.

== Gallery ==
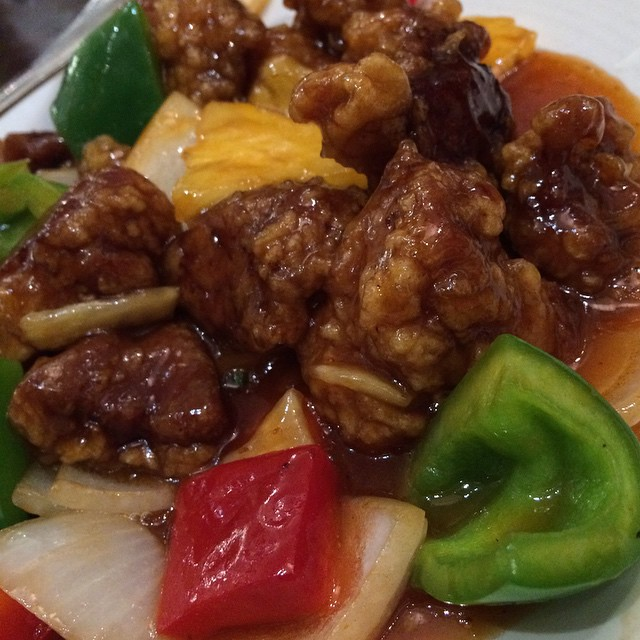
Close-up

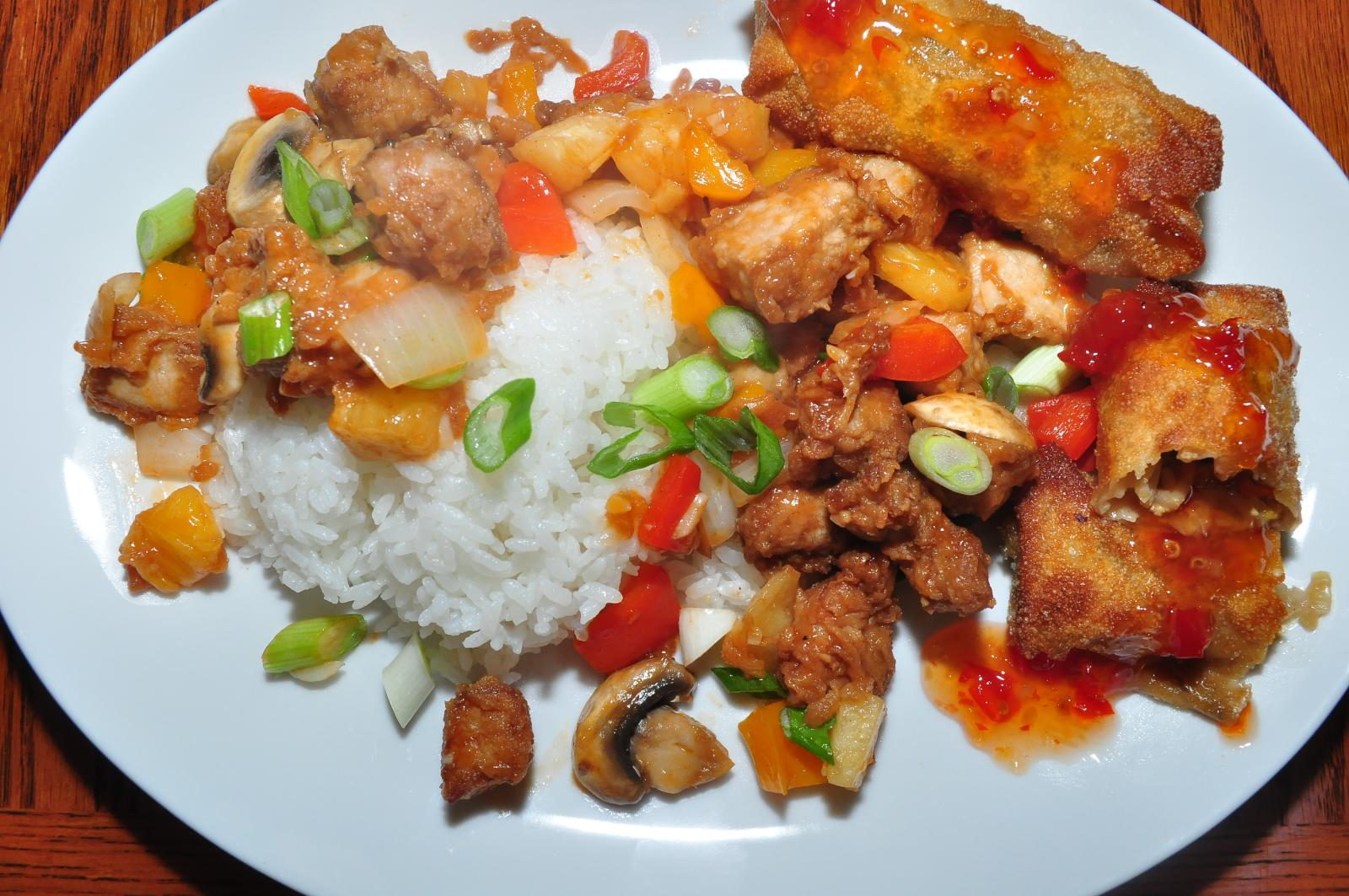
With spring rolls

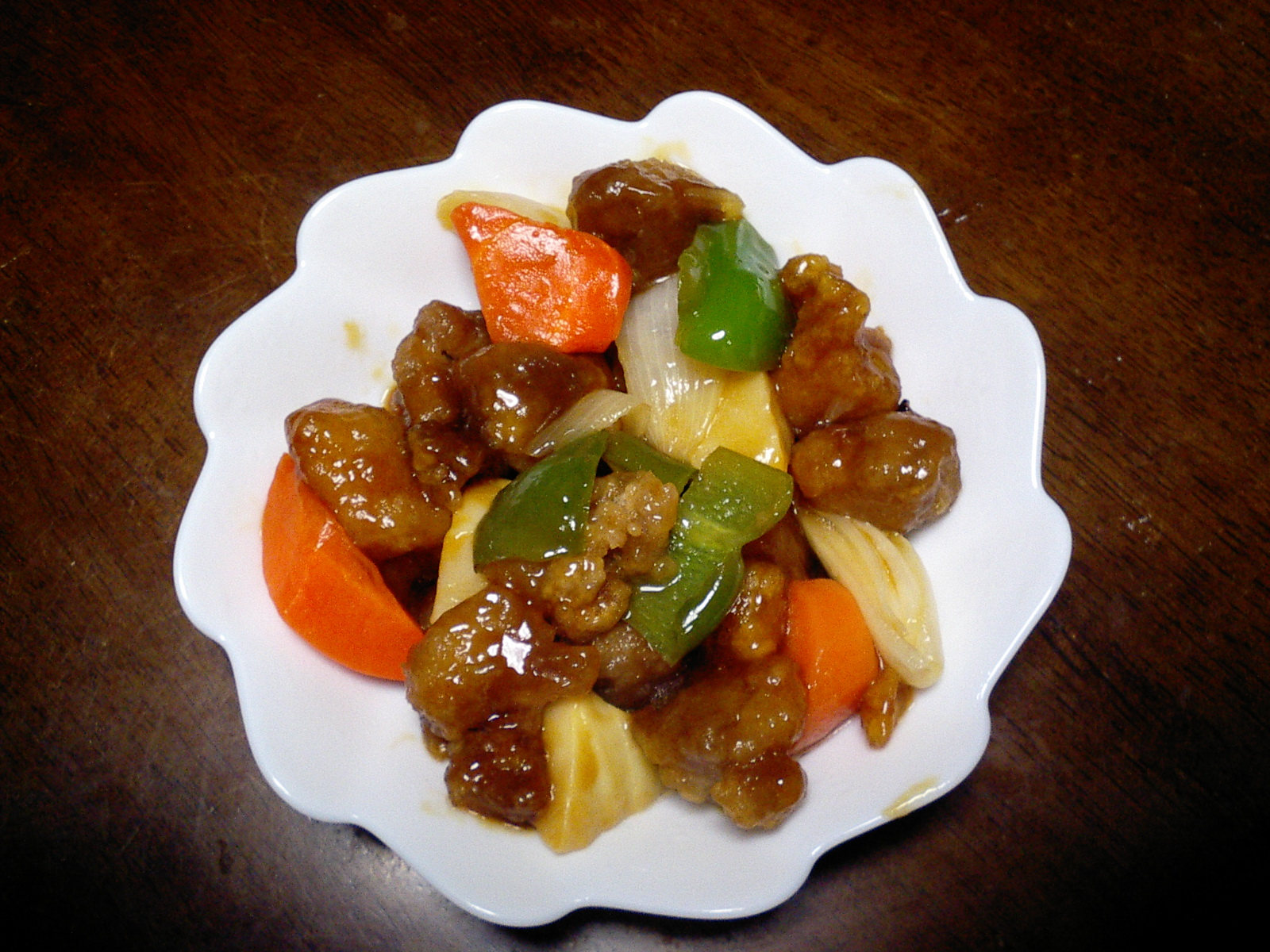
Subuta, a Japanese variant

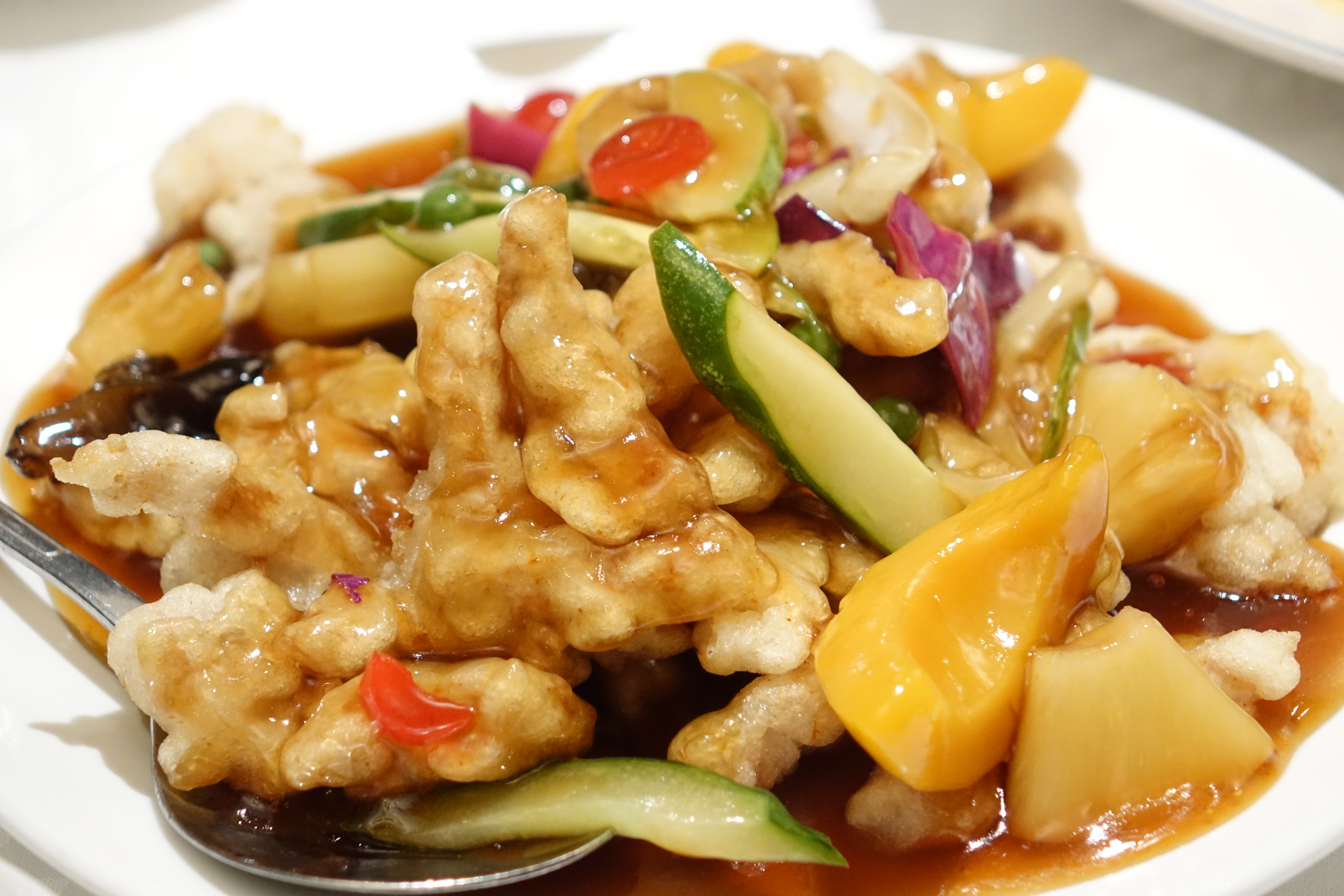
Tangsuyuk, a Korean variant

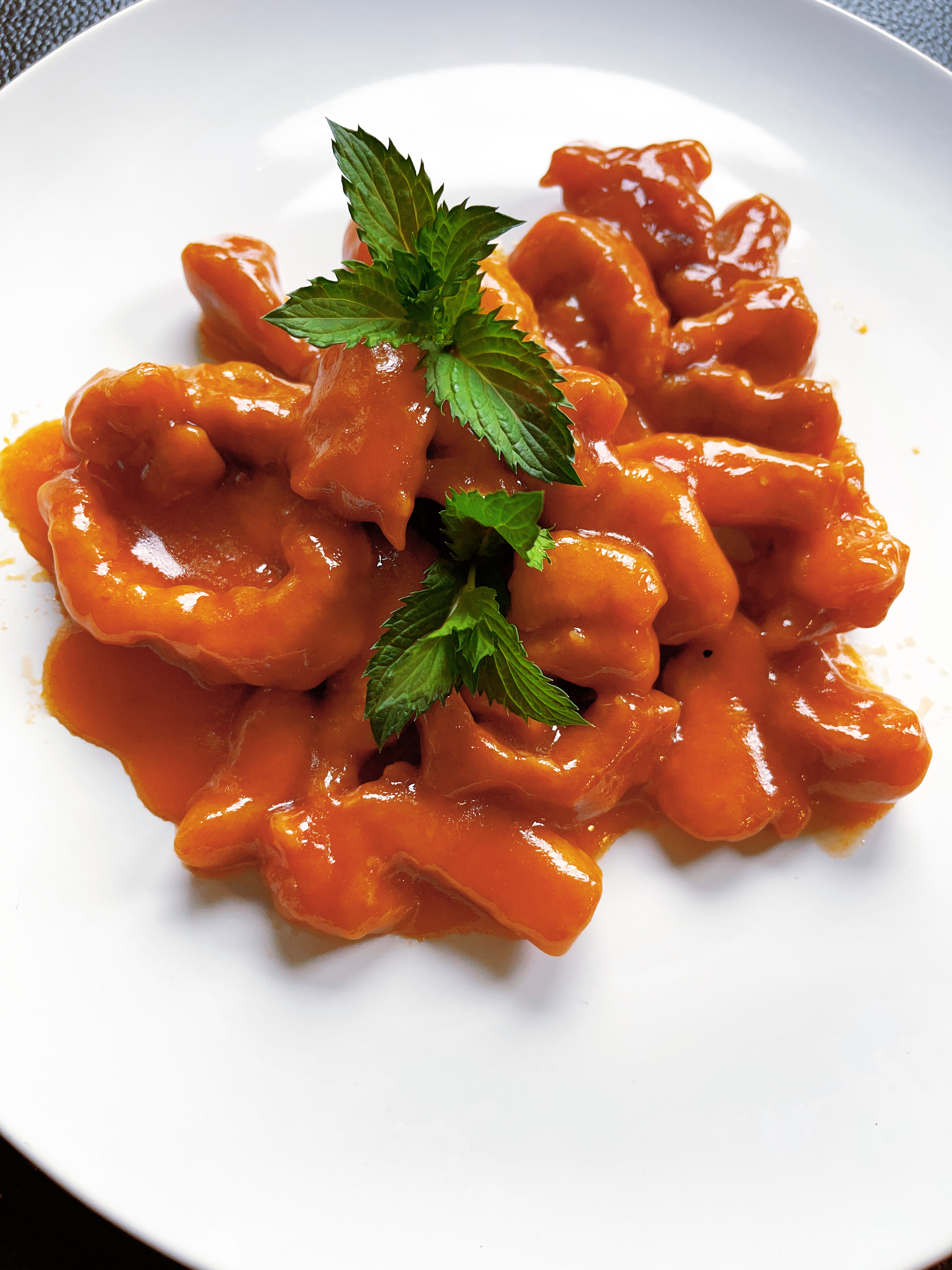
With fresh mint leaves

== See also ==
- Lychee pork
- General Tso's chicken
- Orange chicken
- Tangsuyuk – Korean-Chinese version of sweet and sour pork
- American Chinese cuisine
- Cantonese cuisine
- Chinese Indonesian cuisine
- List of pork dishes
- List of deep fried foods
- Sweet and sour
- Peking pork
- Guo bao rou
