= Sweet and sour =

Cooking method

Sweet and sour is a generic term that encompasses many styles of sauce, cuisine, and cooking methods common to Eurasia. Sweet and sour sauce has remained popular in Asian and Western cuisines since the Middle Ages.

== By region ==
=== East Asia ===
==== Chinese cuisine ====
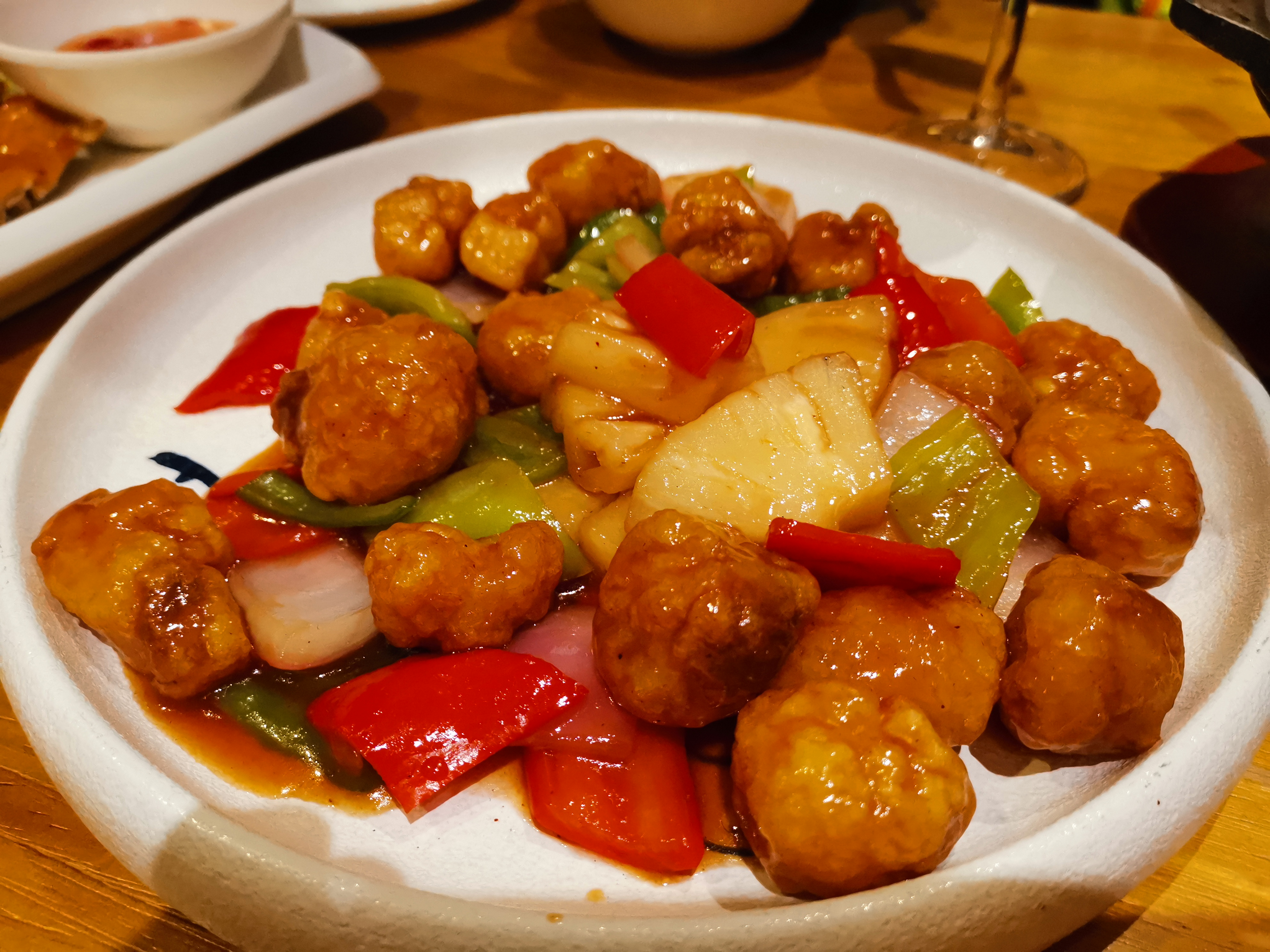
Sweet and sour pork with pineapple and bell pepper

Sweet and sour dishes, sauces, and cooking methods have a long history in China. One of the earliest recordings of sweet and sour may come from Shaowei Yanshi Dan (Chinese: 燒尾宴食單; pinyin: shāowěi yànshí dān; lit. 'Shaowei banquet menu'), a menu of the food served in Tang dynasty (618–907) written in 708. It included many sweet and sour adjacent dishes and recorded that they were invented by Chancellor Wei Juyuan under Emperor Zhongzong of Tang when he hosted the Emperor at his house. Some authors say that the original sweet and sour sauce (Chinese: 糖醋醬; pinyin: tángcùjiàng) came from the Chinese province of Henan, but the sauce in this area is a light vinegar and sugar mixture not resembling what most people, including the Chinese, would call sweet and sour. Many places in China use a sweet and sour sauce as a dipping sauce for fish and meat rather than in cooking, as is common in Westernized Chinese cuisine.

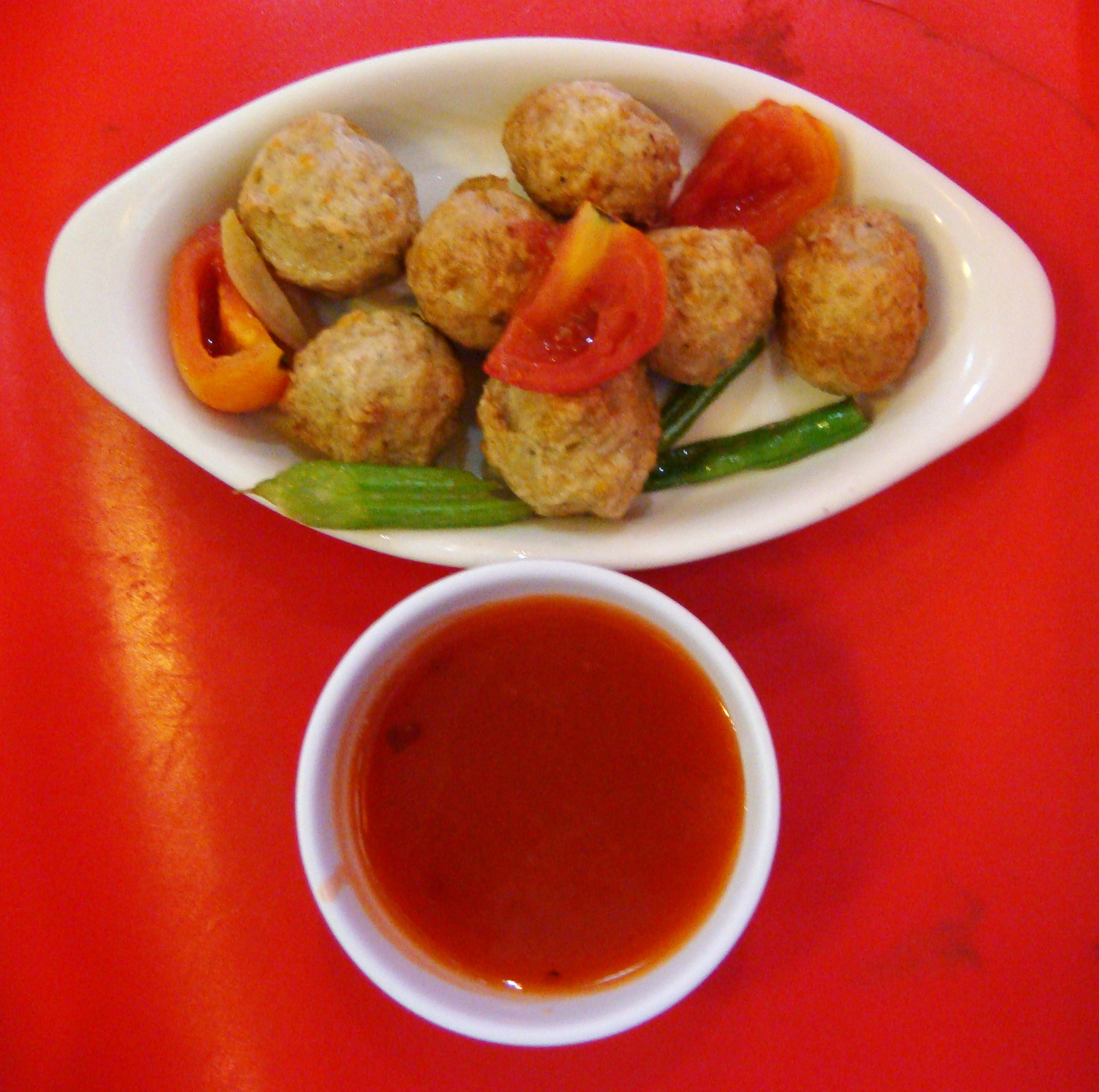
Sweet and sour bid-bid (Pacific tenpounder) balls

This style of using sauces is popular amongst Chinese who tie certain sauces to particular meats such as chili and soy for shrimp and vinegar and garlic for goose. There are, however, some dishes, such as the Cantonese sweet and sour pork or loong har kow (sweet and sour lobster balls), in which the meat is cooked and a sauce added to the wok before serving.

Not all dishes are cooked; some, such as "sweet and sour fruit and vegetable" salad from the eastern regions of China, also find their way in Chinese cuisine. This cold dish combines salad vegetables such as cucumber, tomato, bell pepper, and onion with a mixture of pineapple (or pear), vinegar, and sugar.

In China, the sauces are traditionally made by mixing sugar or honey with a sour liquid such as rice vinegar or soy sauce and spices such as ginger and cloves. Sometimes a paste made from tomatoes is used, but this is rare and normally restricted to Western cooking.

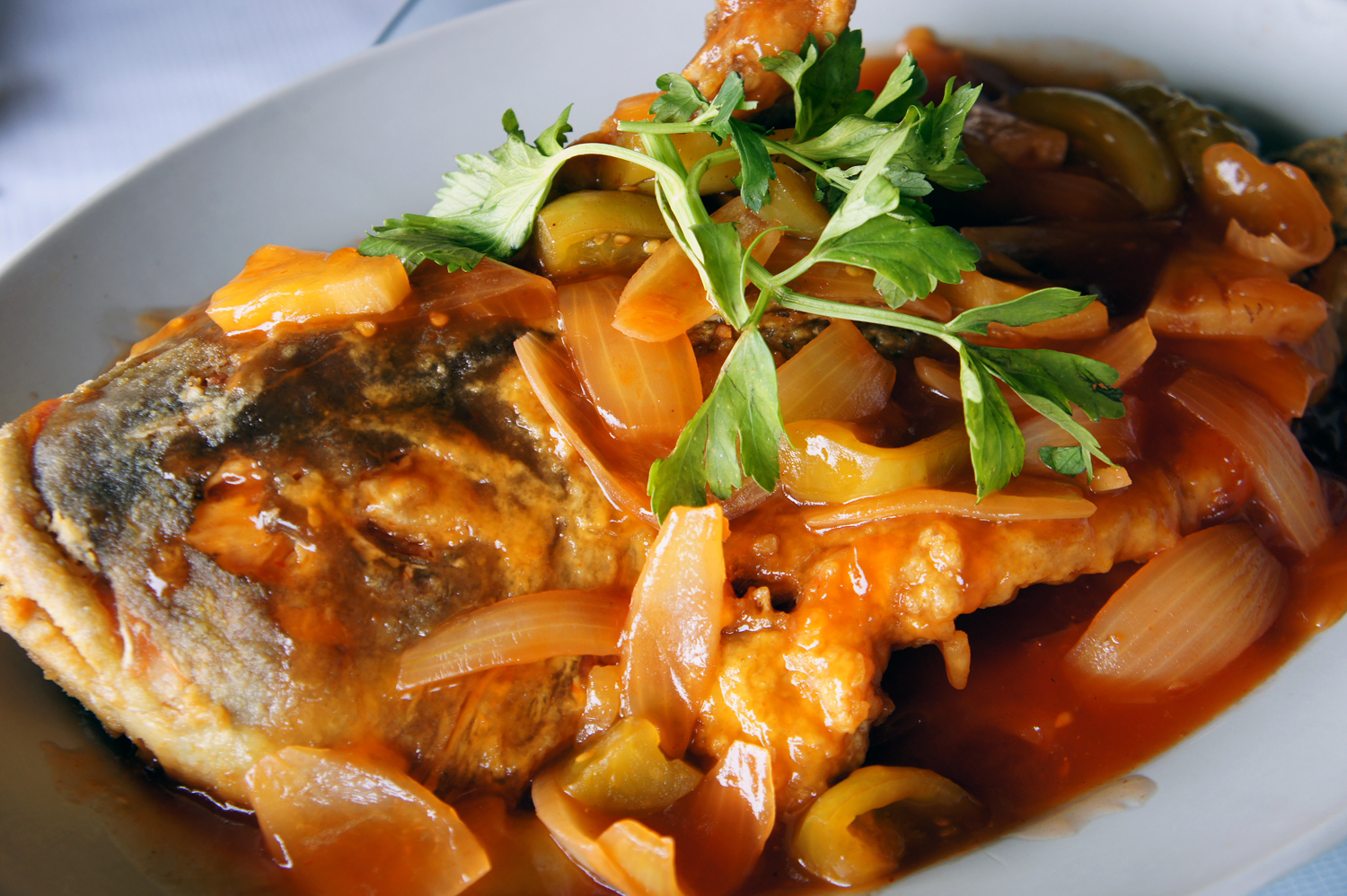
Sweet and sour sea bass

Cantonese sweet and sour sauce is the direct ancestor of the sauce of the same name in the West and was originally developed for sweet and sour pork. The late Hong Kong chef Leung King included the following as his sweet and sour sauce recipe: white rice vinegar, salt, Chinese brown candy, ketchup, Worcestershire sauce, and dark soy sauce. Hong Kong's gourmet Willie Mark Yiu-Tong (better known as Wei Ling|唯靈), a longtime friend of Leung, suggests to contemporary eateries not to resort to cheap bulk manufactured versions of vinegar, ketchup, and Worcestershire sauce, or the sauce will risk being too sharp in taste and might break the balance of flavors. He suggests the more acidic white rice vinegar could be replaced with apple cider vinegar and that ketchup and Worcestershire sauce should be of renowned gourmet brands.

===== Hong Kong/Cantonese =====
The original Cantonese sweet and sour pork (traditional Chinese: 咕嚕肉; simplified Chinese: 咕噜肉; pinyin: gūlūròu; Cantonese Yale: gūlōuyuhk; lit. 'rumbling meat') is made with vinegar, preserved plums and hawthorn candy for an almost scarlet color and sweet-sour taste. A related Hong Kong/Cantonese-based dish is sweet and sour spare ribs (Chinese: 生炒排骨; pinyin: Shēngchǎo páigǔ; Cantonese Yale: sāangcháau pàaigwāt; lit. 'stir-fried spare ribs'). The methods used are identical, with spareribs used instead of pork loin.

===== Guo bao rou =====
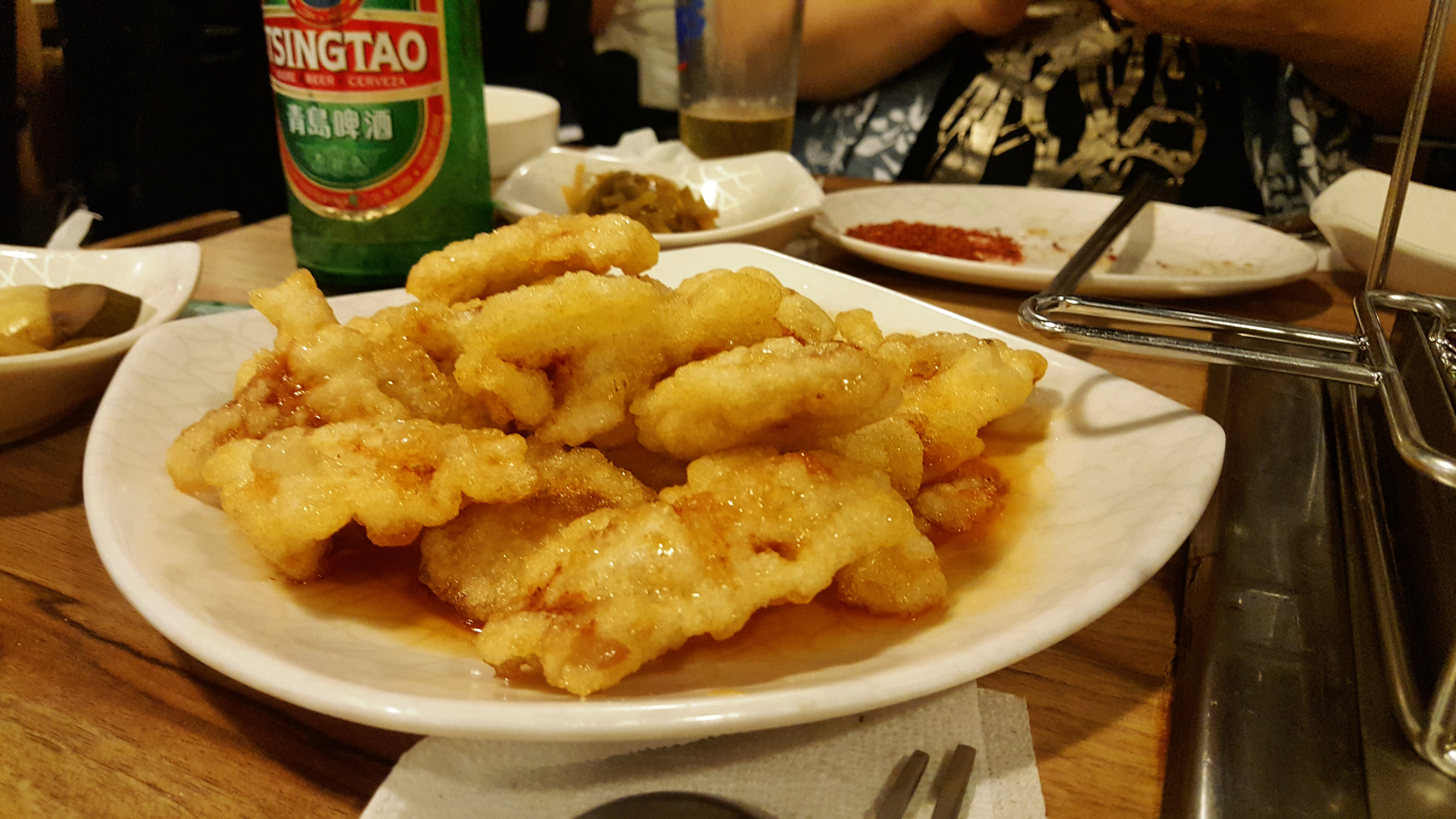
Guo bao rou (original version)

Guo bao rou (traditional Chinese: 鍋包肉; simplified Chinese: 锅包肉; pinyin: Guō bāo ròu) is a classic dish from Northeast China originating in Harbin, Heilongjiang Province. It consists of large thinly sliced pieces of pork tenderloin in potato starch batter, deep-fried twice until crispy. They are then lightly coated in a variation of a sweet and sour sauce, made from freshly prepared syrup and rice vinegar, and flavored with ginger and garlic. The batter absorbs the sauce and softens. A Beijing variant has the sauce thin and watery, while the dish as prepared in Liaoning Province often has a thicker sauce made with ketchup. However, the true or original version of guō bāo ròu served in Harbin, Heilongjiang Province, is made with an amber-colored sauce due to the fact that it uses caramelized sugar.

A similar dish is gu lao rou or sweet and sour pork.

===== Squirrel fish =====
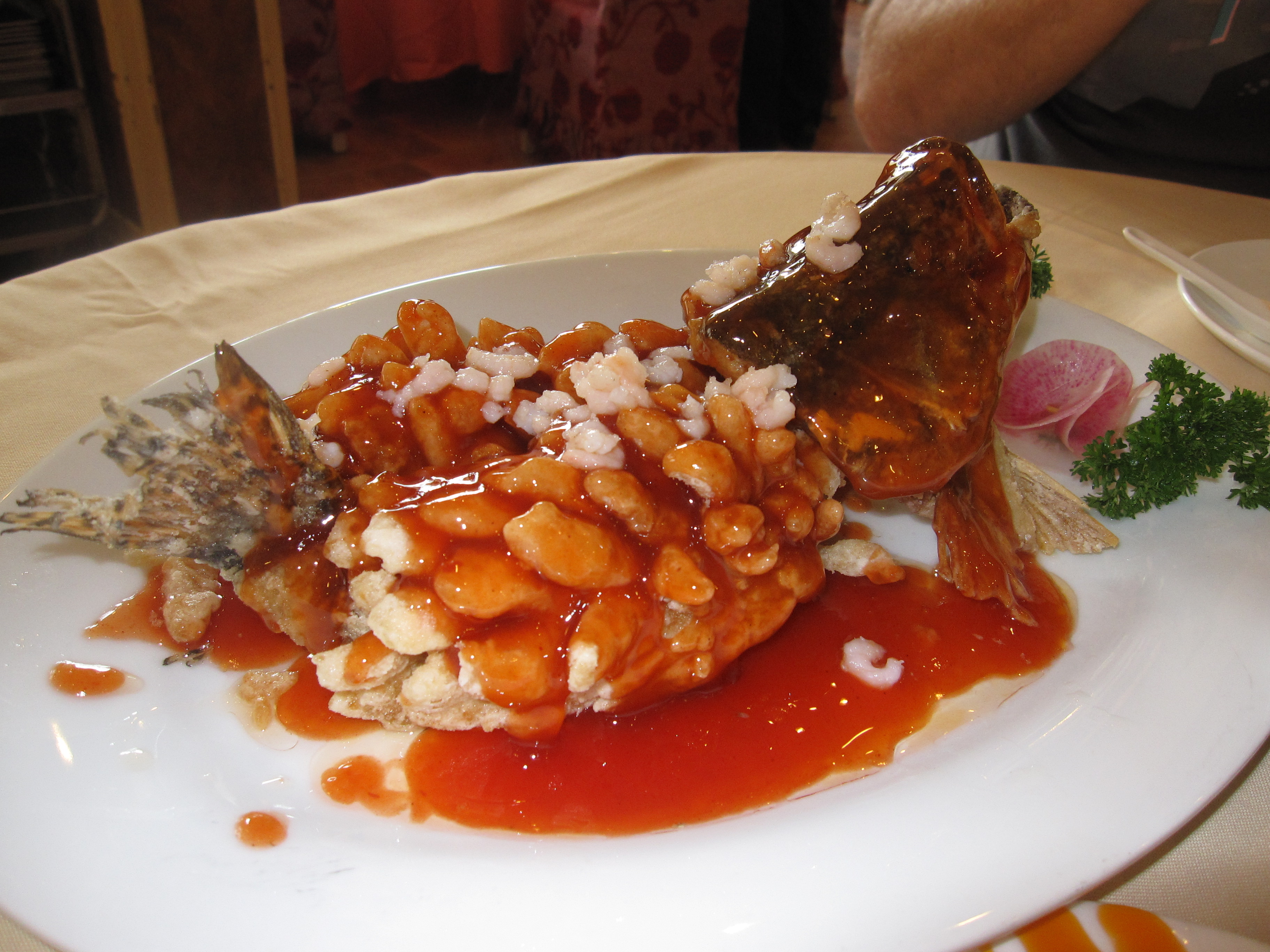
Squirrel fish, a well-known dish in Jiangsu cuisine

Originating in Suzhou, Jiangsu province, the squirrel-shaped Mandarin fish (Chinese: 松鼠鱖魚; pinyin: Sōngshǔ Guìyú) has a crisp skin but soft center. The fish body of Siniperca chuatsi is scored such that it fans out when cooked, similar in appearance to a bushy squirrel tail. The fish is served with a sweet and sour sauce drizzled on top and garnished with a little shrimp meat and dried bamboo shoots.

===== Sweet and sour Yellow River carp =====
A specialty of Shandong province, in particular the city of Jinan, the Yellow River carp is prepared by making diagonal slices partway through its flesh. It is next coated in corn flour, then deep-fried, causing the fish to curl and the slices to open out. Finally, a sweet and sour sauce is poured over the cooked fish. This is one of the distinctive dishes typical of Shandong cuisine.

===== Sweet and sour spare ribs =====
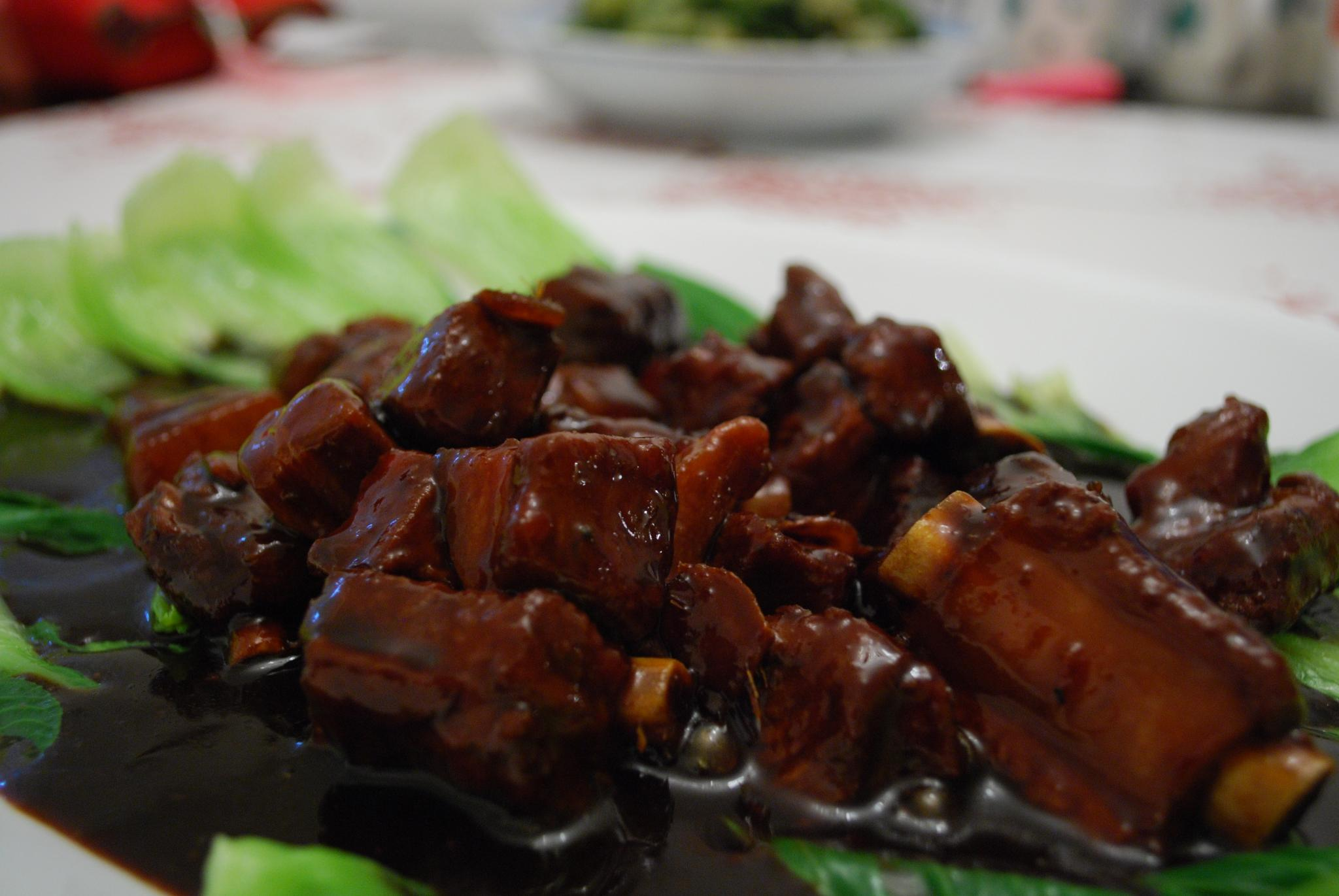
Sweet and sour pork ribs

A popular dish in Shanghai cuisine, sweet and sour spare ribs (Chinese: 糖醋小排; pinyin: tángcù xiǎopái) are made using pork ribs that are lightly coated in cornstarch and seasoned before being fried and served in a sweet and sour sauce.

==== Korean cuisine ====
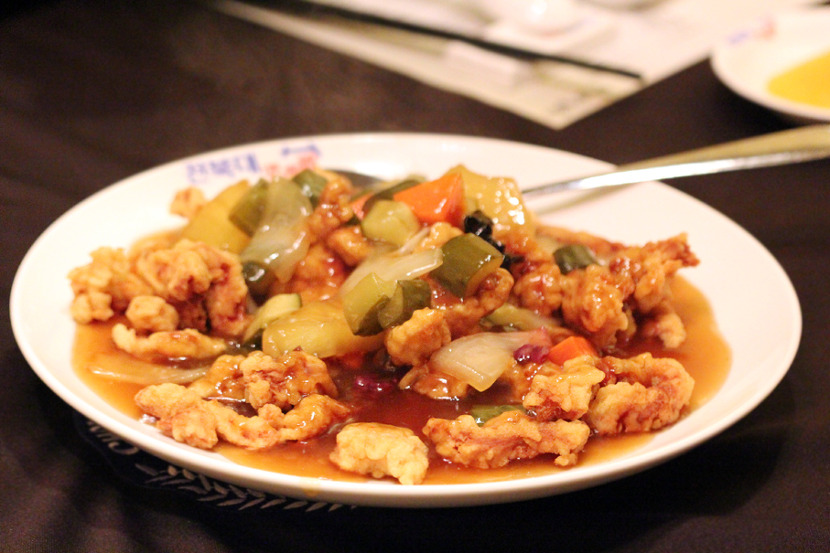
Tangsuyuk

In South Korea, a sweet and sour meat dish known as tangsuyuk (탕수육; 糖水肉) is one of the most popular Korean Chinese dishes. Made with either pork or beef, the bite-sized pieces are usually coated with potato/sweet potato starch/cornstarch or glutinous rice flour and double-fried in oil. The dish is served with sweet and sour sauce, typically made by boiling vinegar, sugar, and water with a variety of fruits and vegetables like carrot, cucumber, onion, wood ear mushroom, and pineapple. Starch slurry is used to thicken the sauce.

=== Europe ===
==== Croatian cuisine ====
The traditional Dalmatian dish Pašticada features prunes and sweet dessert wine (prošek) as the sweet components, and vinegar in the marinade for sourness.

==== English cuisine ====
Sweet and sour sauces have been used in English cuisine since the Middle Ages, with recipes for sweet and sour meat and fish in the 1390 cookery book The Forme of Cury.

==== French cuisine ====
In French cuisine, a sweet and sour sauce base made from sugar and vinegar is a gastrique. Aigre-doux is a sweet and sour sauce in general.

==== Italian cuisine ====
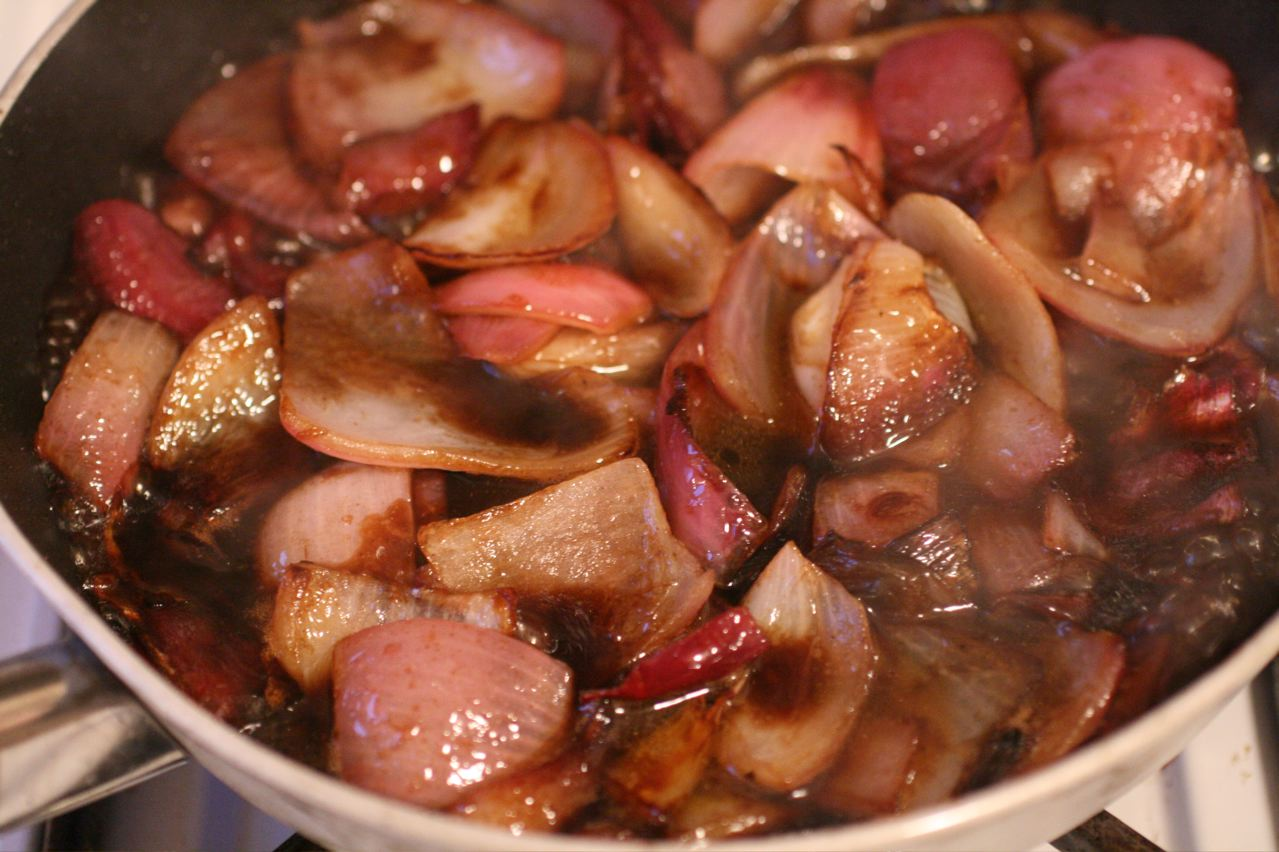
A saucepan of onion with agrodolce sauce

Agrodolce (Italian: [ˌaɡroˈdoltʃe]) is a traditional sweet and sour sauce in Italian cuisine. Its name comes from agro (lit. 'sour') and dolce (lit. 'sweet'). Agrodolce is made by reducing sour and sweet elements, traditionally vinegar and sugar. Sometimes, additional flavorings are added, such as wine, fruit, or even chocolate. One recipe for lamb agrodolce is served over rigatoni or wide noodles, such as pappardelle. Some agrodolce recipes can be used as pickling brine for preserving fruit.

According to food writer Arthur Schwartz, within Neapolitan cooking, sweet and sour was the dominant food pairing before the introduction of the tomato and the mass-uptake of pasta. Preparations using the combination eaten in the modern cuisine include sweet and sour eggplant, but it is never used to flavour pasta dishes.

=== Southeast Asia ===
==== Filipino cuisine ====
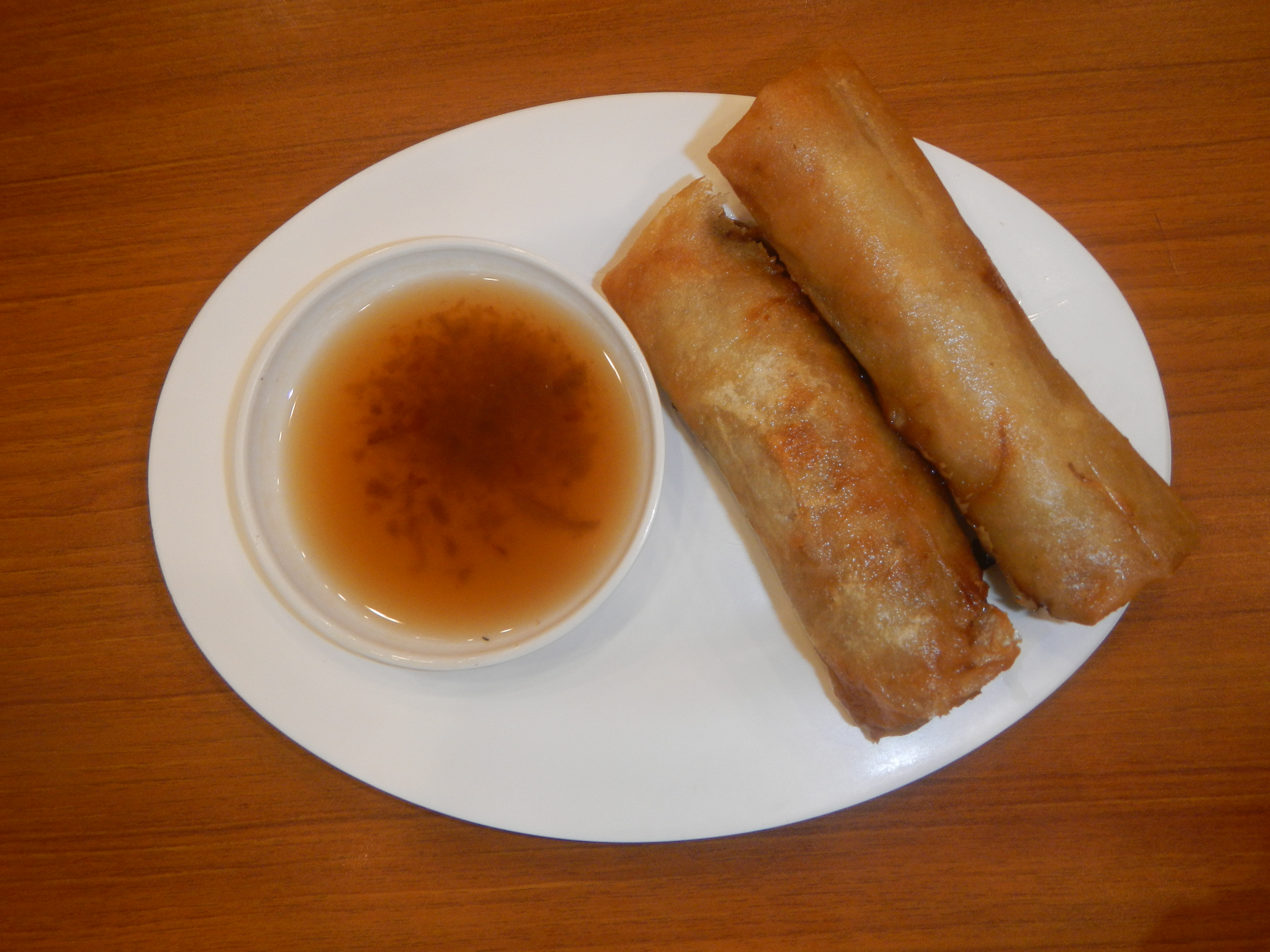
Filipino lumpia with an agre dulce dipping sauce

In Filipino cuisine, sweet and sour sauces are known as agre dulce or Filipino sweet and sour sauce. They are made by mixing cornstarch with water, salt, sugar, and a tangy ingredient (typically tomato ketchup, banana ketchup, or pineapples). The mixture is brought to a boil then simmered until it thickens. Labuyo chilis may also be added. The name means "sour-sweet" in Philippine Spanish, from Spanish agrio ("sour") and dulce ("sweet"). It is also known as agri dulci in Chavacano and the phrase can refer to dishes cooked with the sauce. Agre dulce is commonly used as a dipping sauce for appetizers like lumpia or okoy.

== Fusion cuisine ==
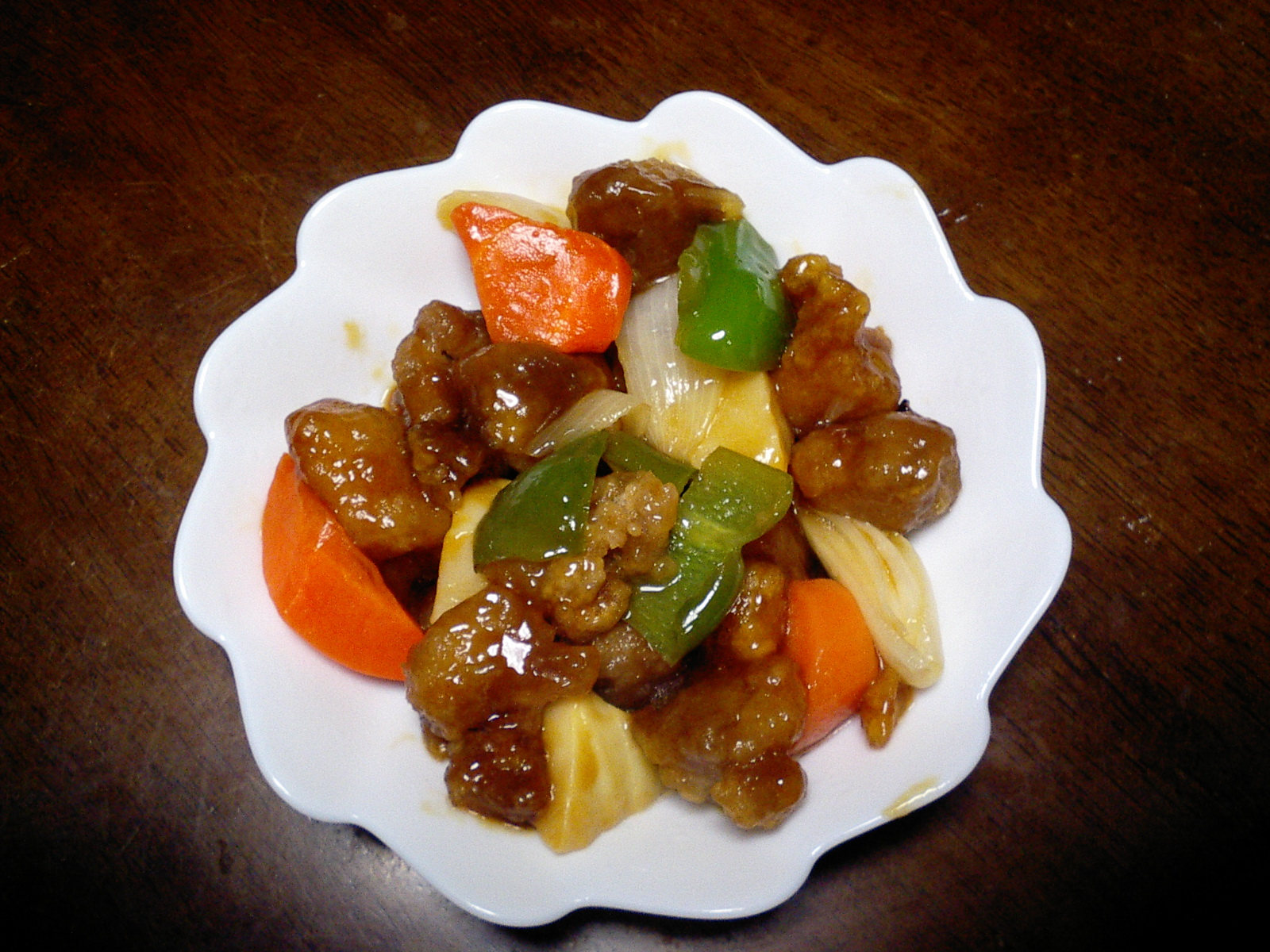
Sweet and sour pork

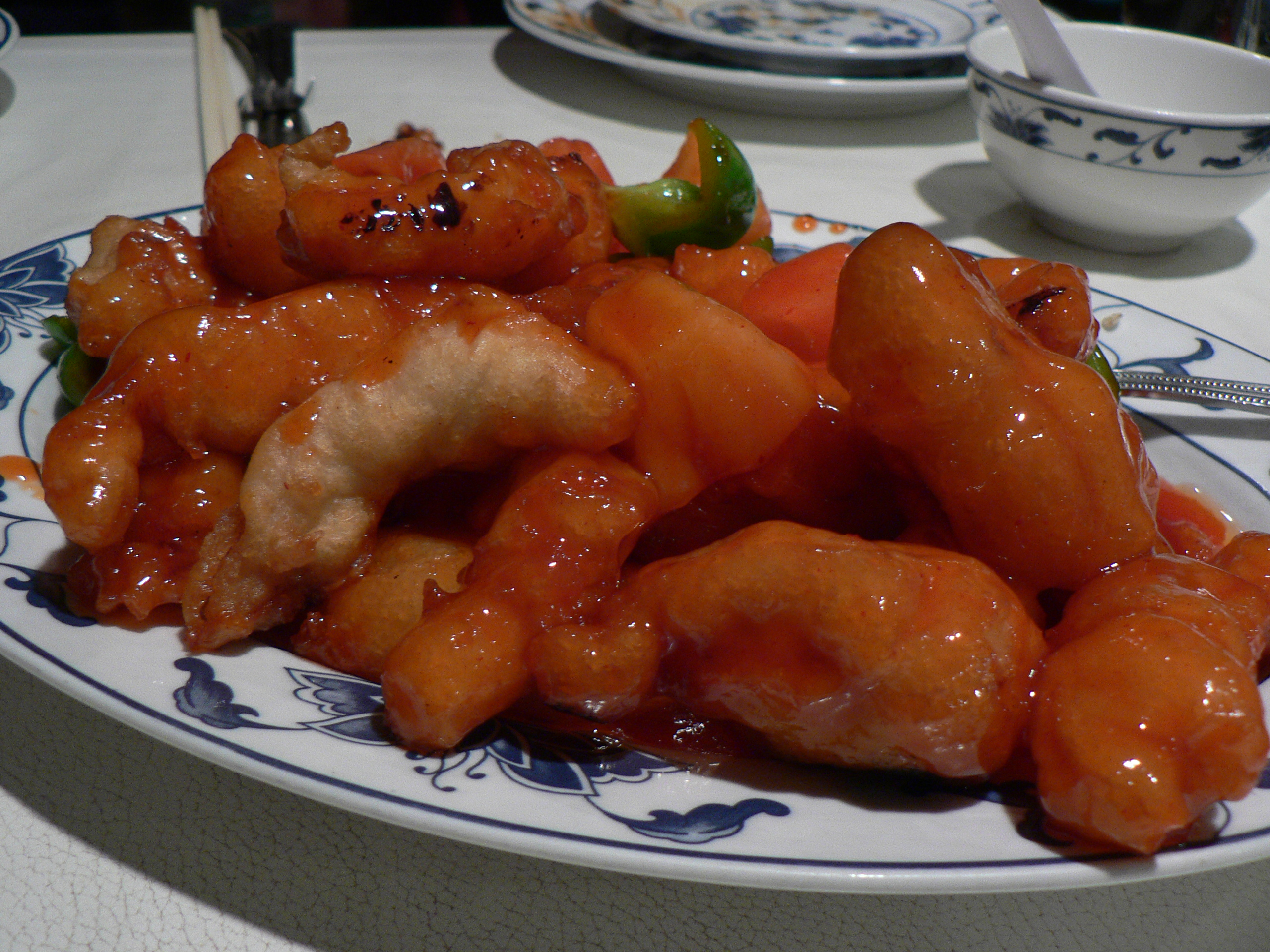
Sweet and sour chicken

Sweet and sour chicken is a dish frequently served in Chinese restaurants in various countries in Oceania, Europe, North America, and South America and available at some restaurants in East Asia and Southeast Asia in an essentially identical version. The dish generally comprises cubes of white meat chicken deep-fried in batter and served with sweet and sour sauce. Sometimes it is topped with pineapple, green pepper, carrot, or sweet pickles.

Sweet and sour pork is a Chinese dish particularly popular in Westernized Cantonese cuisine and may be found worldwide. Several provinces in China produce various dishes that claim to be the ancestor, including a traditional Jiangsu dish called "pork in a sugar and vinegar sauce" (糖醋里脊; pinyin: táng cù lǐjǐ). The dish consists of deep-fried pork cut into bite-sized pieces and subsequently stir-fried in a more customized version of sweet and sour sauce made of sugar, ketchup, white vinegar, and soy sauce and additional ingredients including pineapple, green pepper (capsicum), and onion. In more elaborate preparations, the dish's tartness is controlled by requiring that Chinese white rice vinegar be used sparingly and using ketchups with less vinegary tastes, while some restaurants use unripe kiwifruits and HP sauce in place of vinegar.

Western cultures use sweet and sour sauce in two different ways. Dishes can either include the sauce as an ingredient in cooking or use the sauce as a pour-over or dipping sauce for the meal.

Chinese restaurants in Western countries commonly serve battered and deep-fried chicken, pork, or shrimp with a sweet and sour sauce poured on top. It is also common to find the sweet and sour sauce cooked with sliced green peppers, onions, and pineapple before it is poured over the meat.

Many Western dishes involve cooking the meat with a variety of ingredients to make a complete sweet and sour dish in the manner of gu lo yuk. The most popular dishes are those of pork and shrimp. In French cuisine, it has been developed contrary to traditional French cooking practices, and the preparation of sweet and sour sauce (Aigre-douce) often involves immersing the food in a plentiful amount of sauce.

Common in Western sweet and sour sauce is the addition of fruits such as pineapple and vegetables such as sweet pepper and green onions. Traditional rice vinegar is becoming more readily available due to the increase in Asian food stores but a mixture of vinegar and dry sherry is often still used in sweet and sour dishes. Also common is the use of cornstarch as a thickener for the sauce and tomato ketchup to give a stronger red color to the dish and to add a Western taste. Most supermarkets across Europe and North America carry a range of prepared sweet and sour sauces for adding to stir-fry or dipping.

Primarily in North America, sweet and sour sauce is available as a dipping sauce at Chinese takeout establishments in small plastic packets or containers.

In Britain, Thai-style sweet chili sauce has recently overtaken the previous popularity of Chinese-style sweet and sour sauce to the extent it can often be found at non-Asian establishments for a wide variety of Western-style snacks from fishcakes to chips and seafood such as calamari and prawns.

A number of variations are used in barbecue cuisine, either homemade or prepared from a number of common brands.

Besides American Chinese restaurants, popular fast food restaurants such as McDonald's, Burger King, and Wendy's carry their own proprietary brands of sweet and sour sauce packets. These are commonly offered and used as a dipping sauce for chicken fingers and chicken nuggets.

== See also ==
- Acetomel
- Agre dulce
- Escabeche
- Duck sauce
- Hoisin sauce
- List of dips
- List of Chinese sauces
- List of Italian dishes
- List of sauces
- Lychee pork
- Palapa
- Plum sauce
- Rainbow sauce
- Reduction (cooking)
- Sweet chili sauce
- Vincotto
- Vinegar
