= Bigarade sauce =

Classic French sauce

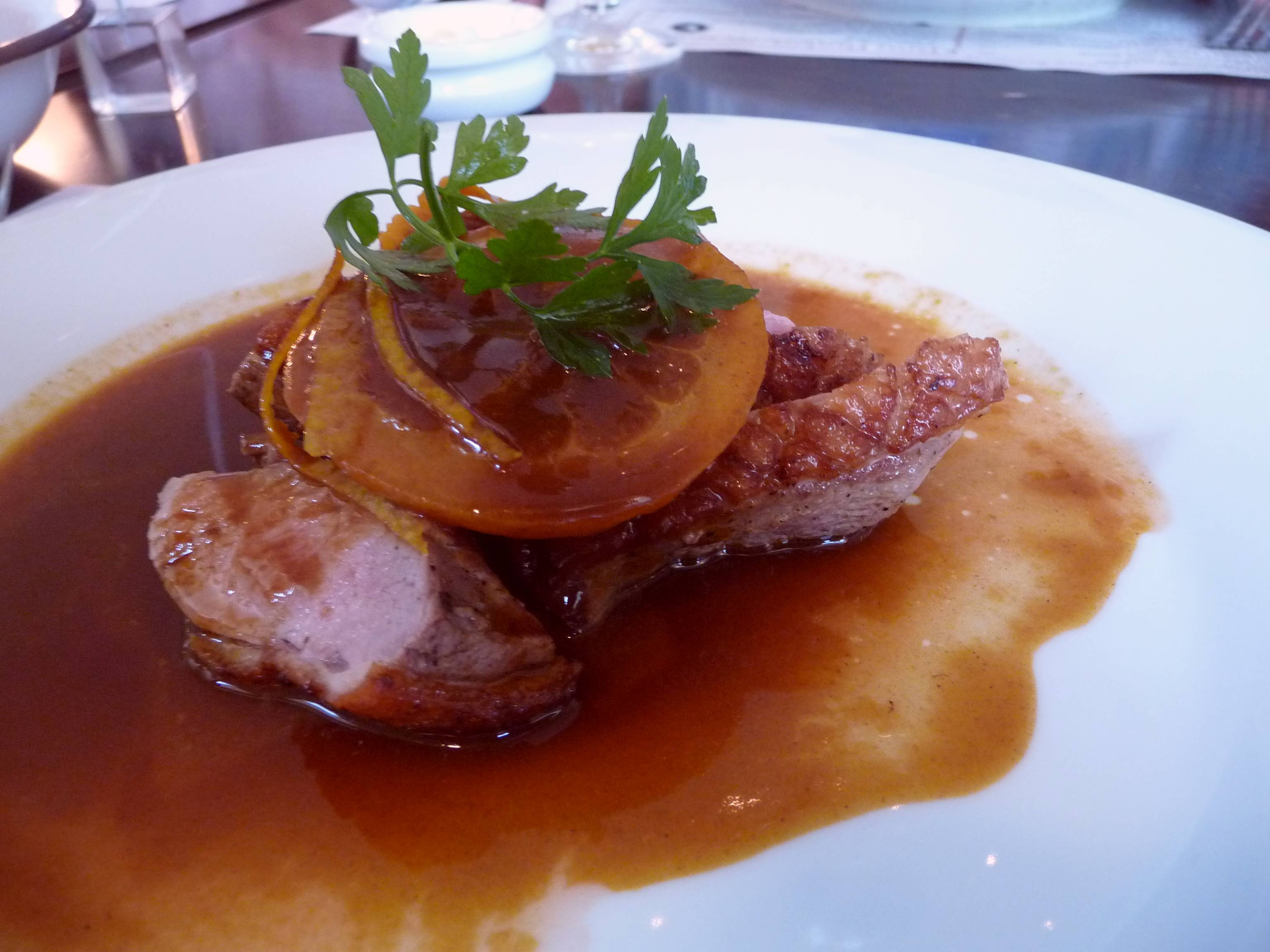
Duck a l'orange

Bigarade sauce is an orange sauce based on the gastrique, sugar caramelized with white vinegar. The name comes from the bigarade orange, which is nowadays mainly replaced by sweet oranges.

The recipe initially contained equal parts of lemon juice and orange juice with zests from these same fruits, but nowadays, only the orange juice and zests are used.

Its best-known use is in the French dish duck à l'orange.

== See also ==
- List of sauces
