= Duck à l'orange =

French dish

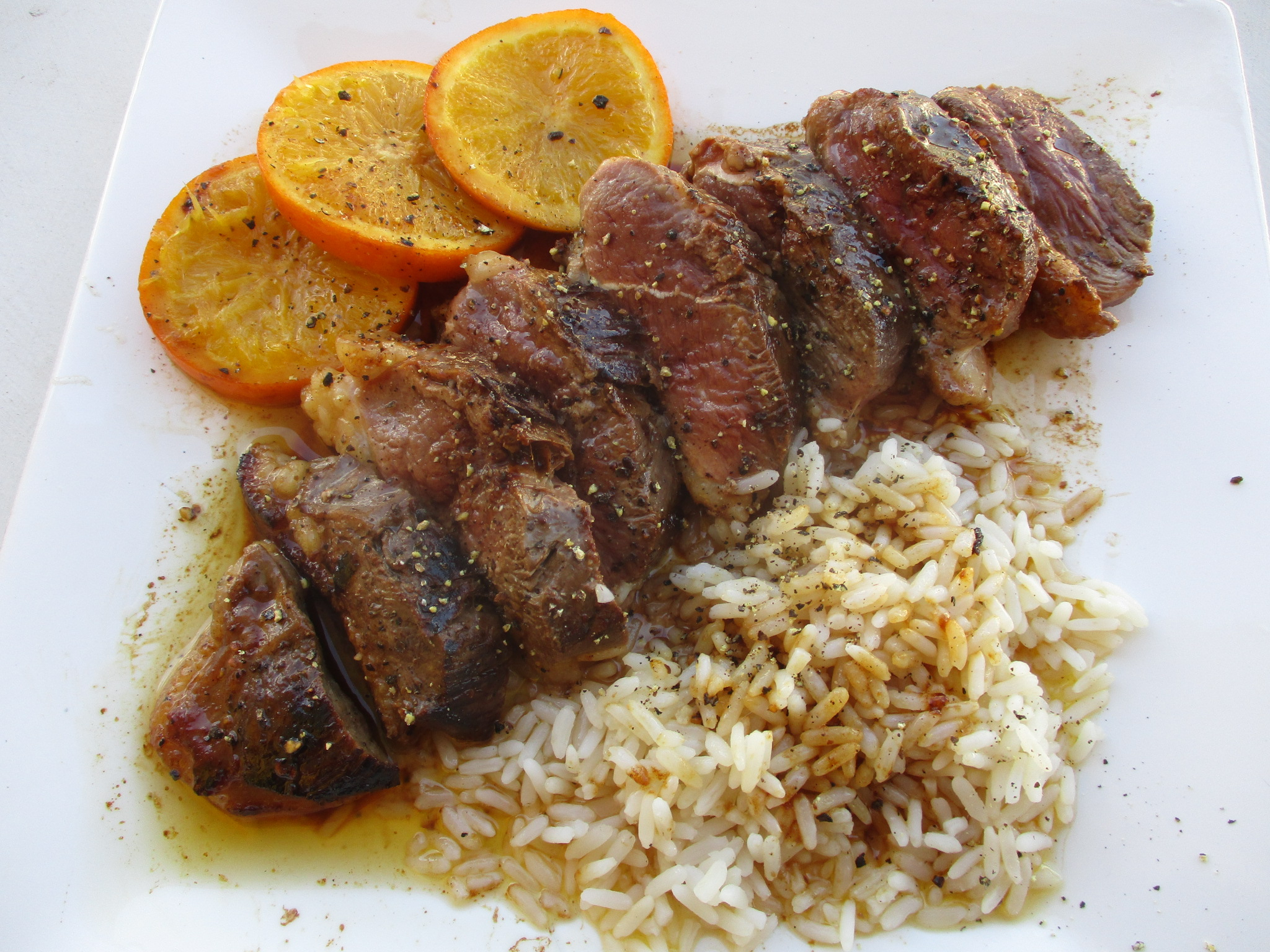
- Alternative names: Orange duck, canard à l'orange
- Place of origin: France
- Main ingredients: Duck, orange, butter, stock, sugar, vinegar

Duck à l'orange, orange duck, or canard à l'orange is a French dish in cuisine bourgeoise consisting of a roast duck with a bigarade sauce.

According to some historians, the dish traces its roots to the Middle East, particularly, ancient Persia, where meats were cooked with various fruits. The original French dish was known as canard à la bigarade referring to bitter Seville oranges. Other historians suggest a version of the dish was introduced to France by Catherine de' Medici's accompanying cooks when she married King Henry II of France in 1533. However, this claim is debated among food historians.

The first officially published recipe of the dish appeared in chef Louis Eustache Ude's 1813 book The French Cook, under the name Ducklings à la bigarade. The dish was later formally codified by Auguste Escoffier in his book Le Guide Culinaire where he describes the under canard sauvage à la bigarade. Duck à l'orange gained popularity in the United States in the 1960s partly due to Simone Beck, Louisette Bertholle and Julia Child's Mastering the Art of French Cooking.

By the early 21 Century the dish was often considered tacky and outdated; food writer Olivia Potts described it as "hard to believe [duck à l'orange] wasn't always a byword for naff", and chef Gordon Ramsay described the dish as "the culinary equivalent of flared trousers".

== See also ==
Media related to Canard à l'orange at Wikimedia Commons Duck à l'Orange at the Wikibooks Cookbook subproject

- Duck as food
- Bigarade sauce
- Sauce gastrique
- Pressed duck
