= Peking pork =

Chinese meat dish

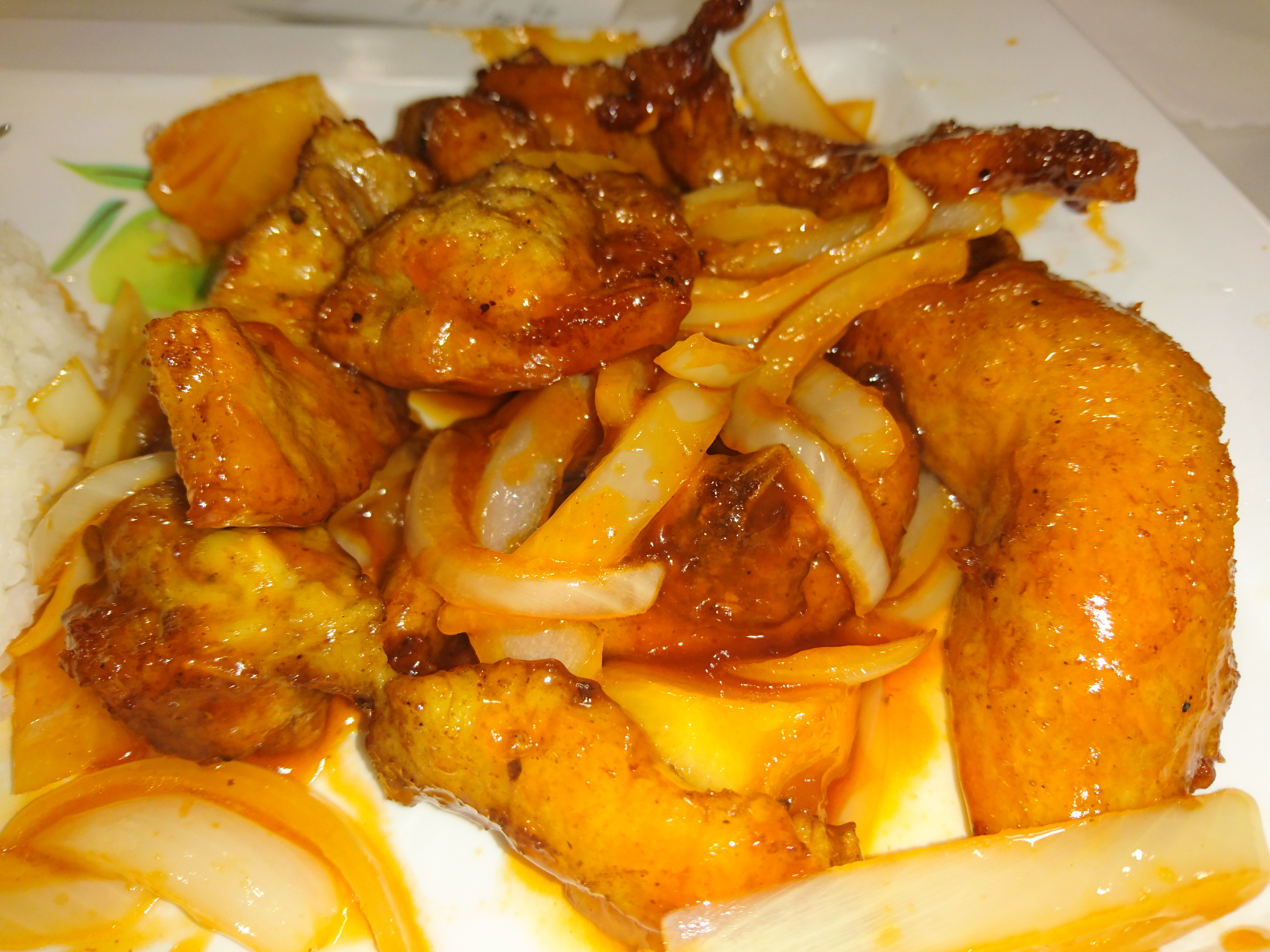
Peking pork chop served in Cantonese restaurants in Hong Kong

Peking Pork (Chinese: 京都排骨; pinyin: jīngdūpáigǔ) is a Chinese meat dish, although the dish’s name would be better translated as "Capital Rib.” “Peking”, referring to Beijing, China, is a misnomer. The dish actually refers to a Cantonese style sweet and sour dish. The "capital" may refer to Nanjing, a former capital city of China that is closer to the region where sweet and sour dishes originated. This dish consists of crisp deep-fried pork ribs which are coated in a sweet red sauce. The dish is found in Chinese restaurants in Hong Kong, Australia, the USA, a few other Western countries, and is not usually found in China. It's likely the origin of Pork Ribs King (Chinese: 排骨王; pinyin: páigǔ wáng), a similar dish popular in Singapore and Malaysia.
