= Tangsuyuk =

Korean Chinese sweet and sour meat dish

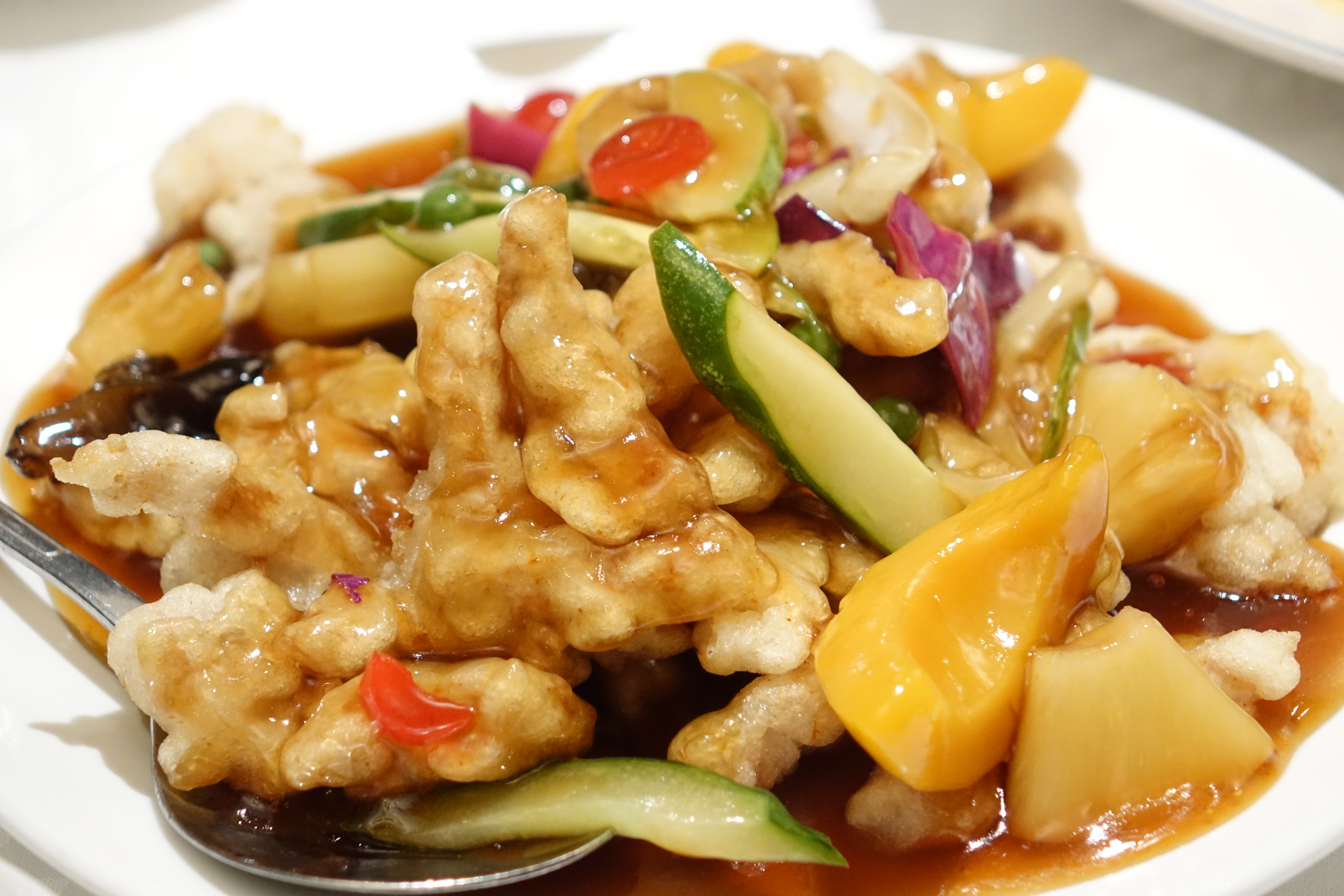
- Region or state: Incheon Chinatown
- Associated cuisine: Korean Chinese cuisine
- Created by: Chinese immigrants in Korea
- Serving temperature: Warm
- Main ingredients: Pork or beef loin, sweet and sour sauce
- Similar dishes: Guo bao rou, Sweet and Sour Pork, subuta

Korean name
- Hangul: 탕수육
- Hanja: 糖水肉
- RR: tangsuyuk
- MR: t'angsuyuk
- IPA: [tʰaŋ.su.juk̚]

Tangsuyuk (Korean: 탕수육) is a Korean Chinese meat dish with sweet and sour sauce. It can be made with either pork or beef.

== History ==
Tangsuyuk is a dish that was first made by Chinese merchants in the port city of Incheon, where the majority of the ethnic Chinese population in contemporary South Korea live. It is derived from guōbāoròu, a Shandong-style sweet and sour pork dish, as Chinese immigrants in Korea, including those that had first migrated to Northeastern China, mostly had Shandong ancestry.

== Etymology ==
Although the Chinese characters meaning "sugar" (糖), "vinegar" (醋), and "meat" (肉) in the original Chinese name "糖醋肉 (pronounced táng cù ròu in Chinese)" are pronounced dang, cho, and yuk in Korean, the dish is called tangsuyuk, not dangchoyuk, because the word tangsu is derived from the transliteration of the Chinese pronunciation tángcù [tʰǎŋ.tsʰû], with the affricate c [tsʰ] in the second syllable weakened into fricative s [s]. Transliterated loanwords like tangsu do not comprise Sino-Korean vocabulary and do not carry hanja.

The third syllable ròu (肉) was not transliterated, as Sino-Korean word yuk (육; 肉) meaning "meat" was also commonly used in Korean dish names.

As the word tangsuyuk is the combination of the transliterated loanword tangsu and Sino-Korean yuk, it was not a Sino-Korean vocabulary that could be originally written in hanja. However, the first syllable shared the same Sino-Xenic root enabling the use of the same hanja, and Koreans back-formed the second syllable with hanja su (수; 水), meaning "water", perhaps because the sauce was considered soupy.

== Preparation ==
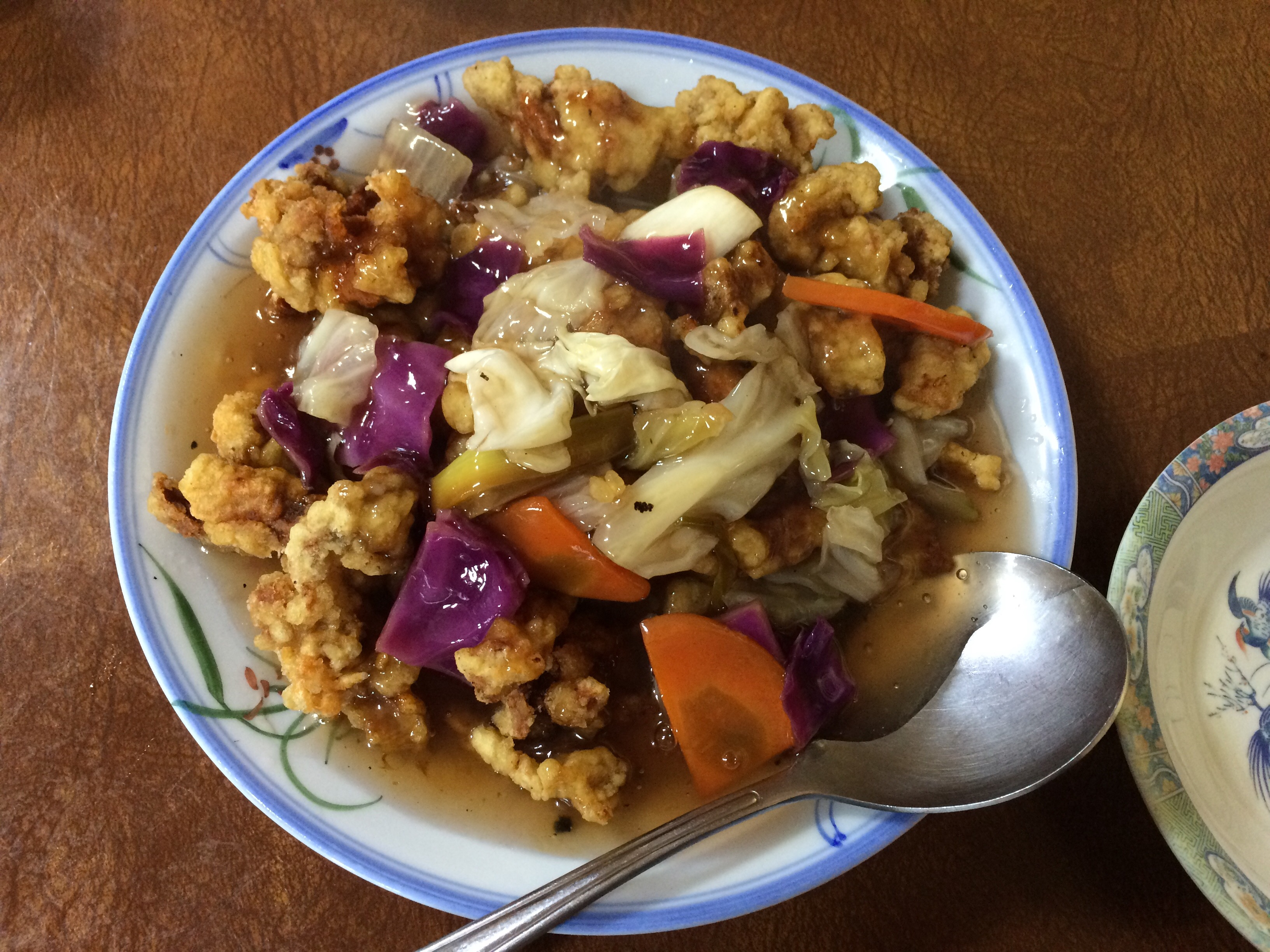

Bite-size pieces of pork or beef loin are coated with batter, usually made by soaking a mixture of potato or sweet potato starch and corn starch in water for several hours and draining the excess water. Glutinous rice flour may also be used. Egg white or cooking oil is added to the batter to change its consistency. Similarly to other Korean deep fried dishes, battered tangsuyuk meat is double-fried.

Tangsuyuk is served with sweet and sour sauce, which is typically made by boiling vinegar, sugar and water, with variety of fruits and vegetables like carrot, cucumber, onion, water chestnut, wood ear mushroom and pineapple. Starch slurry is used to thicken the sauce.

=== Pouring versus dipping ===
There is a debate on whether one should pour the sauce directly onto tangsuyuk or individually dip each piece. The dippers (찍먹파; jjingmeokpa), such as Anh Sung-jae, argue such practice preserves the crunchy texture, while the pourers (부먹파; bumeokpa) argue it enhances flavor. Tangsuyuk as served in restaurants was originally served with the sauce coated. However, the advent of food delivery services necessitated the sauce to be packaged separately to prevent the tangsuyuk from becoming soggy, leading to the debate.

== Gallery ==
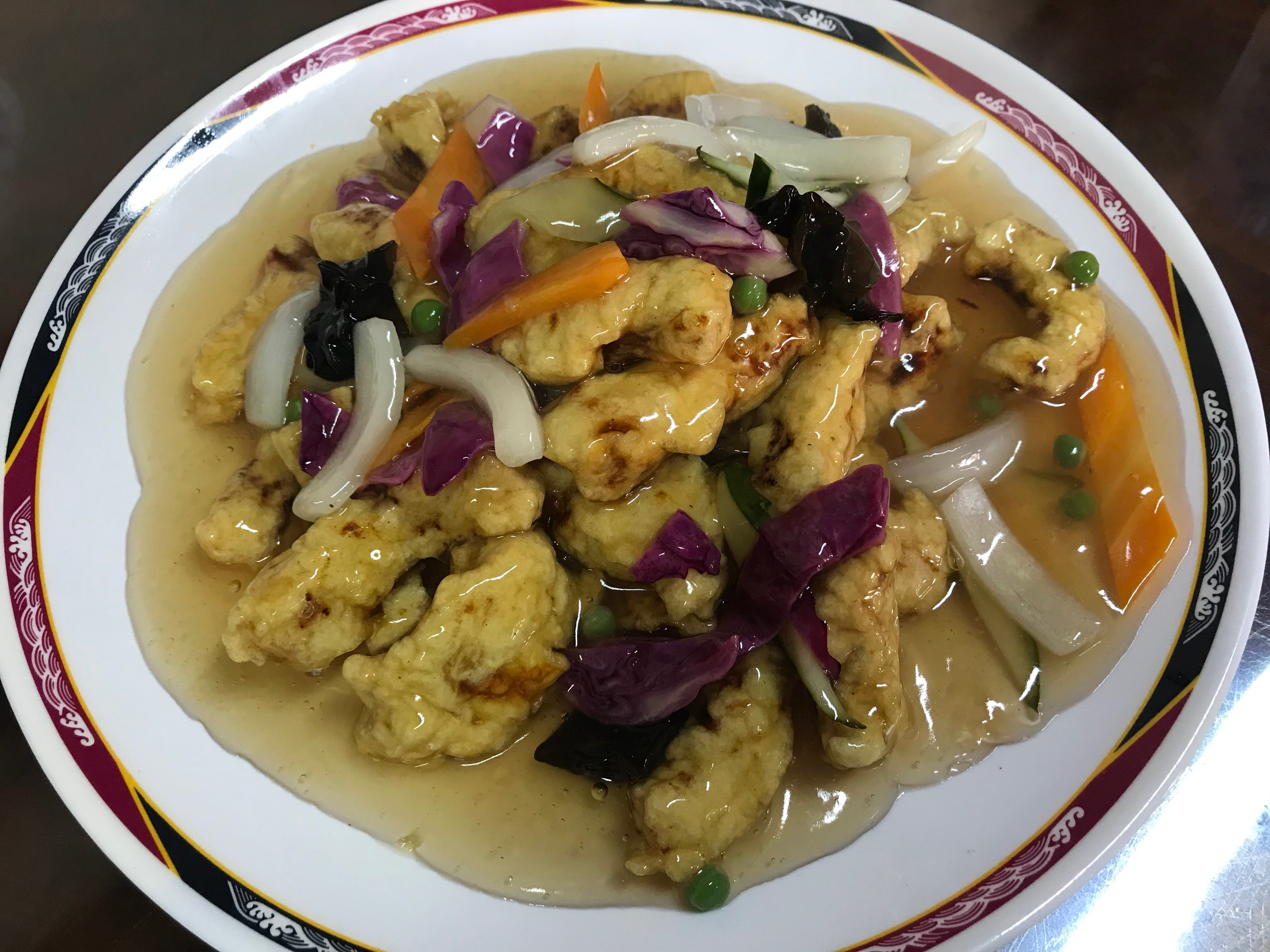

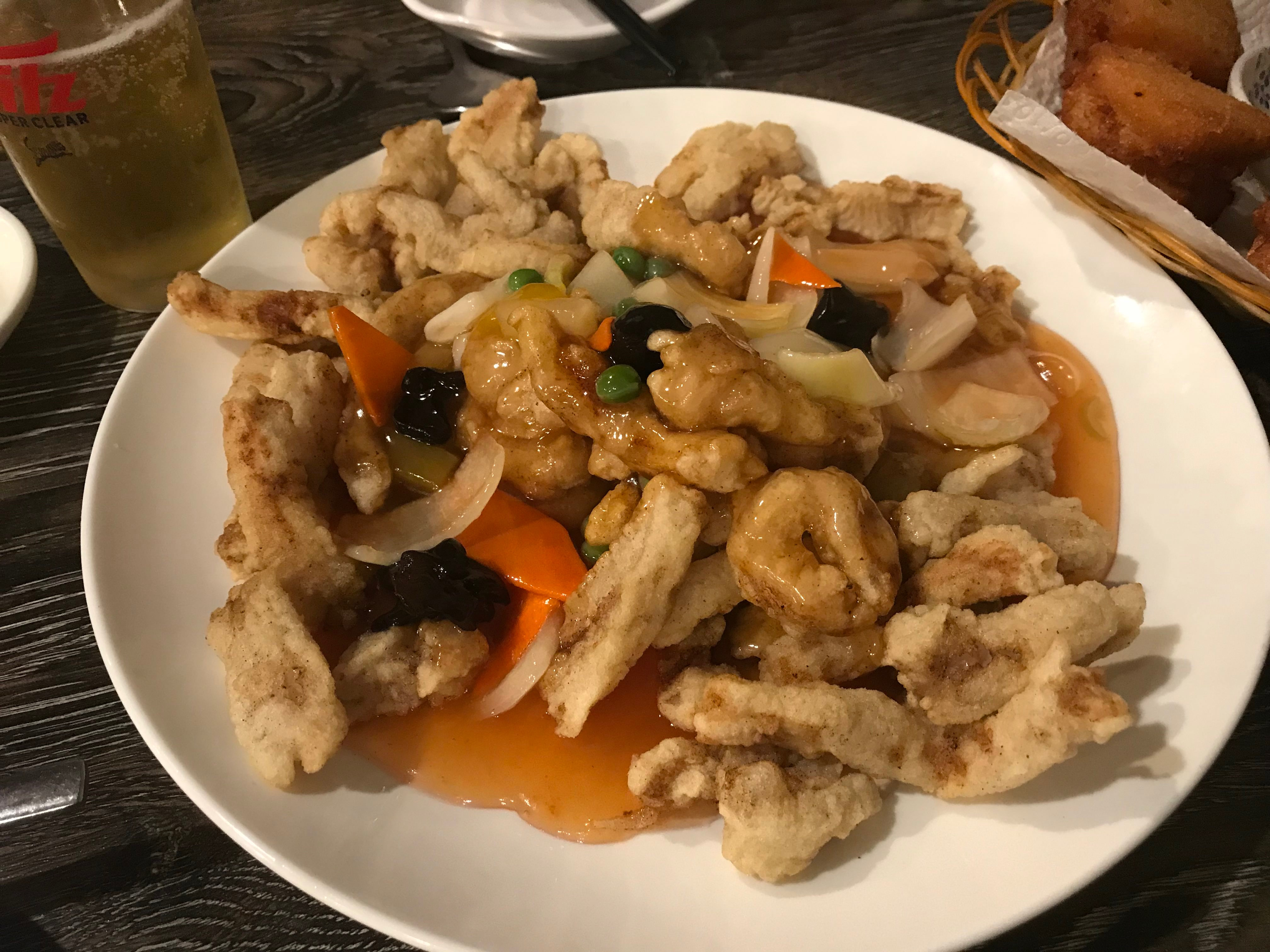

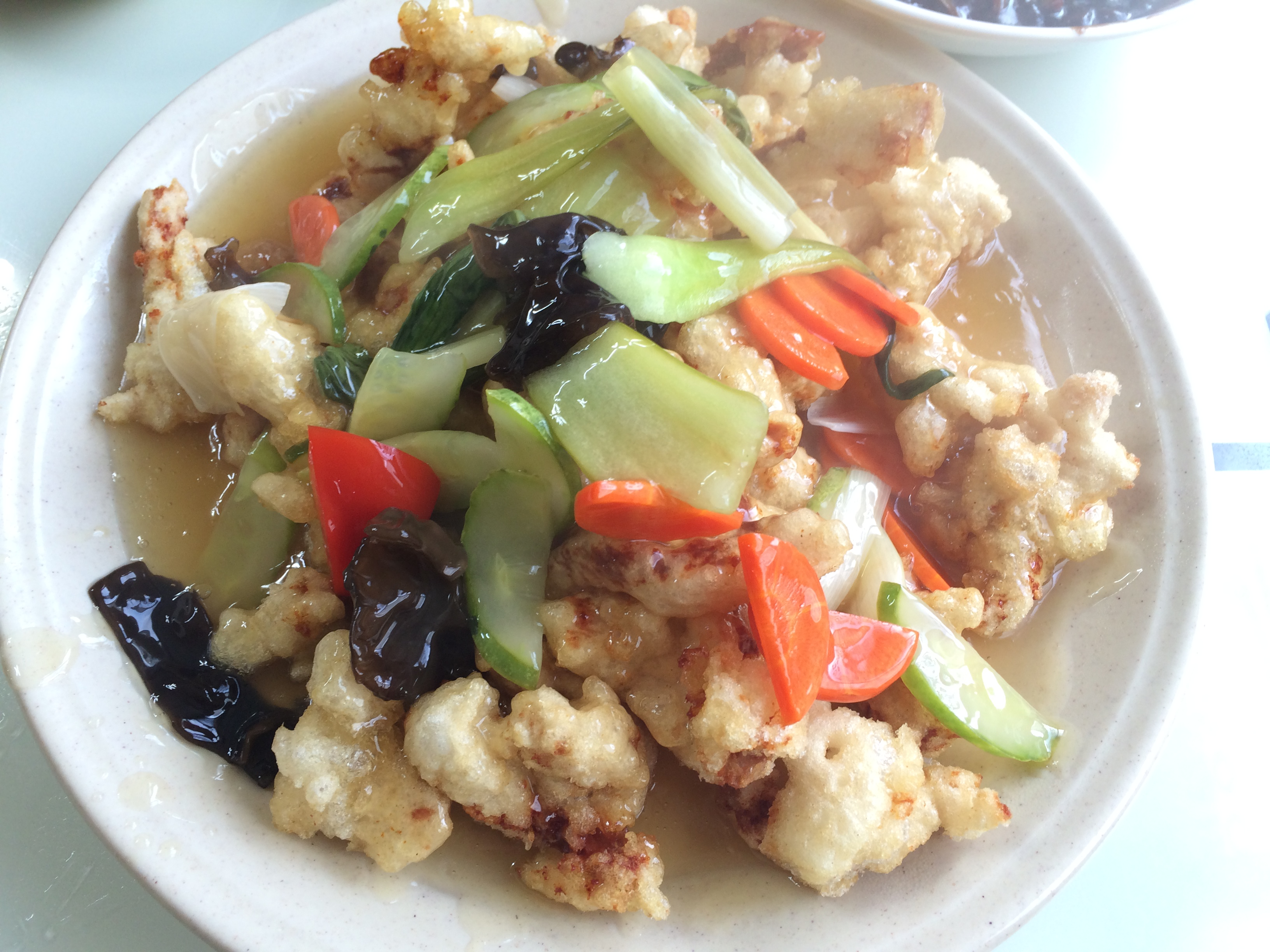

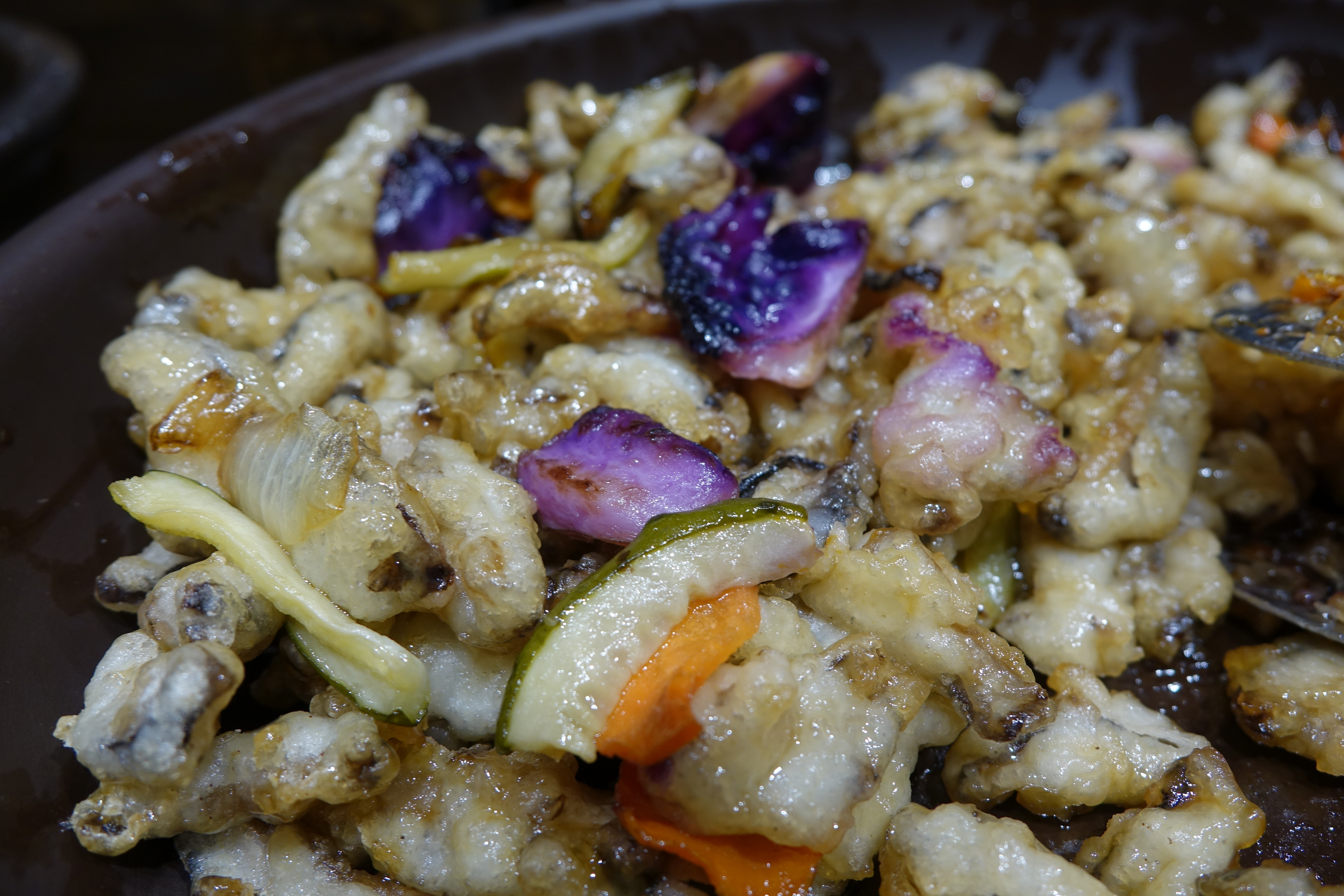
Beoseot-tangsuyuk, a vegan/vegetarian tangsuyuk dish using shiitake mushroom as a meat substitute

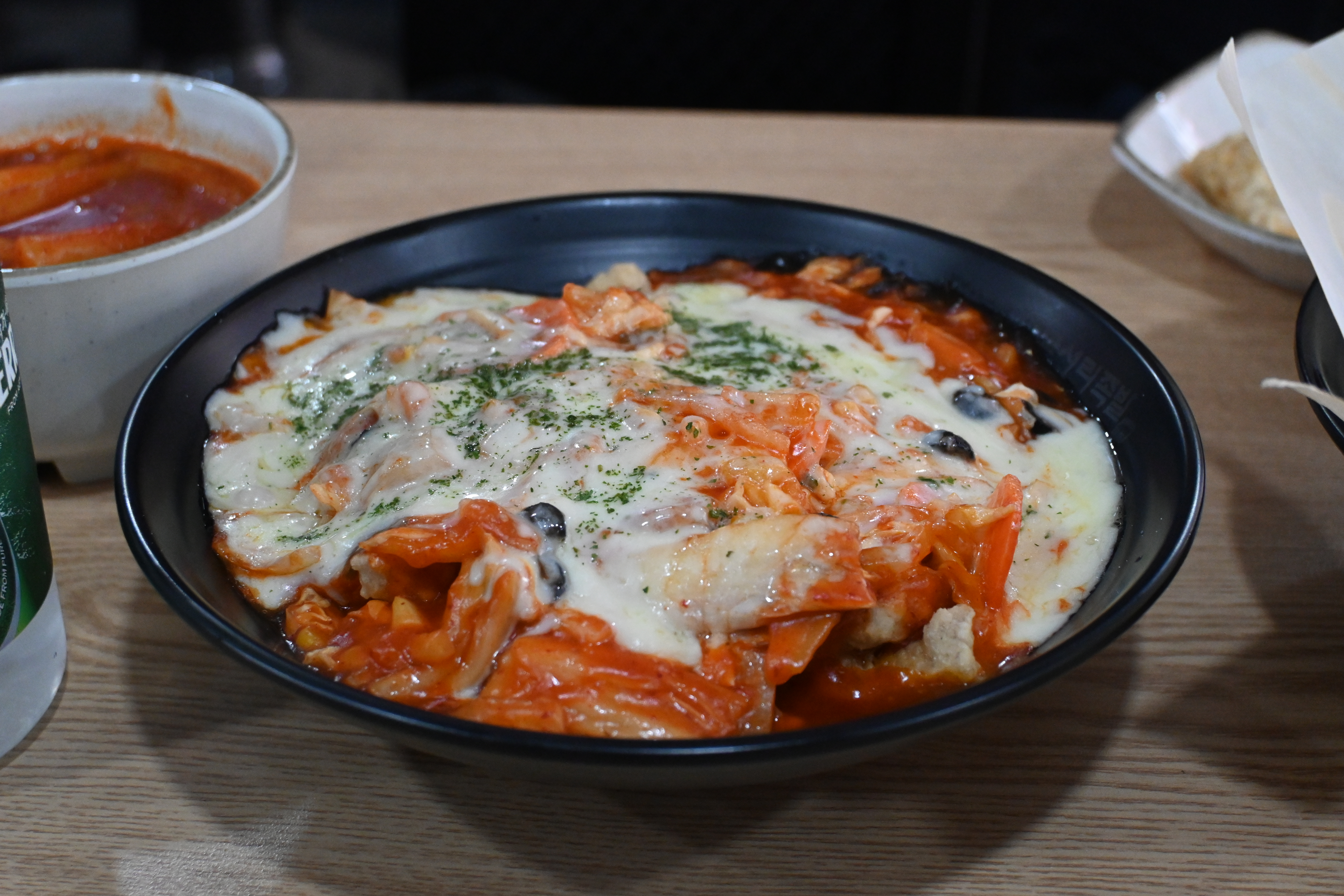
Gimpitang, a blend of kimchi, pizza, and tangsuyuk

== See also ==
- Guōbāoròu
- Jjamppong, another example of Korean Chinese cuisine
