= Lychee pork =

Fujian Chinese dish

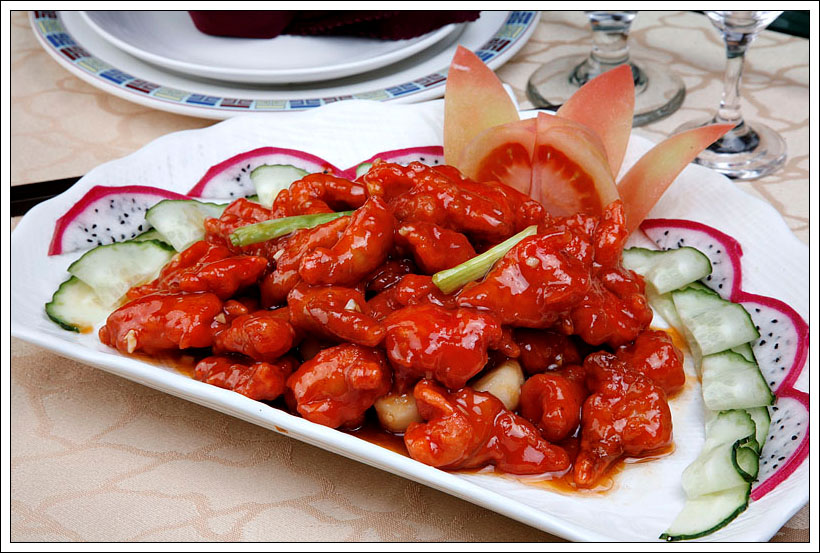
- A plate of lychee pork, served with cucumber, garlic, and leek
- Alternative names: Lizhi rou
- Type: Lunch, dinner
- Place of origin: Fuzhou
- Region or state: Fujian
- Serving temperature: Hot
- Main ingredients: Pork, water chestnuts, red wine lees
- Ingredients generally used: Yams, tomatoes, green onions
- Food energy (per serving): 297 kcal (1,240 kJ)
Nutritional value
(per serving)
- Protein: 12.8 g
- Fat: 12.7 g
- Carbohydrate: 9.1 g

Lychee pork, or lizhi rou (Chinese: 荔枝肉; pinyin: lìzhī ròu; Pe̍h-ōe-jī: lāi-chi-bah; Eastern Min: liĕk-chiĕ-nṳ̆k), is a dish in Fujianese cuisine that consists of small pieces of deep-fried pork and sliced water chestnuts served in a sweet and sour sauce. Its bright red colour is derived from red yeast rice. In lower-end restaurants, the sauce is commonly made with ketchup, soy sauce, and rice vinegar.

Lychee pork
- Chinese: 荔枝肉
Transcriptions
Standard Mandarin
- Hanyu Pinyin: lìzhī ròu
Southern Min
- Hokkien POJ: lāi-chi-bah
Eastern Min
- Fuzhou BUC: liĕk-chiĕ-nṳ̆k

== History ==
Lychee pork is commonly associated with the cuisines of Fuzhou and Putian. Its creation can be traced back to the Tang dynasty, and the dish is considered to be a prominent strand of Min cuisine. Despite its name, it does not contain the lychee fruit. Its name is instead derived from the appearance of the dish, in which the red and curled fried pieces of pork resemble the skin of lychee.

The origin of the dish is attributed to a legend involving Mei, a royal consort of the Xuanzong Emperor of the Jiang clan. The consort, who came from Putian, was said to be frequently homesick, due to the distance of the imperial court from her hometown. Lychees from Putian were said to cure her despondency but were rarely available due to the difficulty of transporting the fruit. It is believed that the chef employed by Mei, Jiang (Chinese: 老蒋头; pinyin: lǎo jiǎng tóu), devised a recipe to cook meat so that it resembled lychees. Mei was later killed in the Anshi Rebellion, and the chef was believed to have escaped and fled back to Fujian, bringing the dish with him.

== See also ==
- Sweet and sour pork
