= Reduction (cooking) =

Cooking process

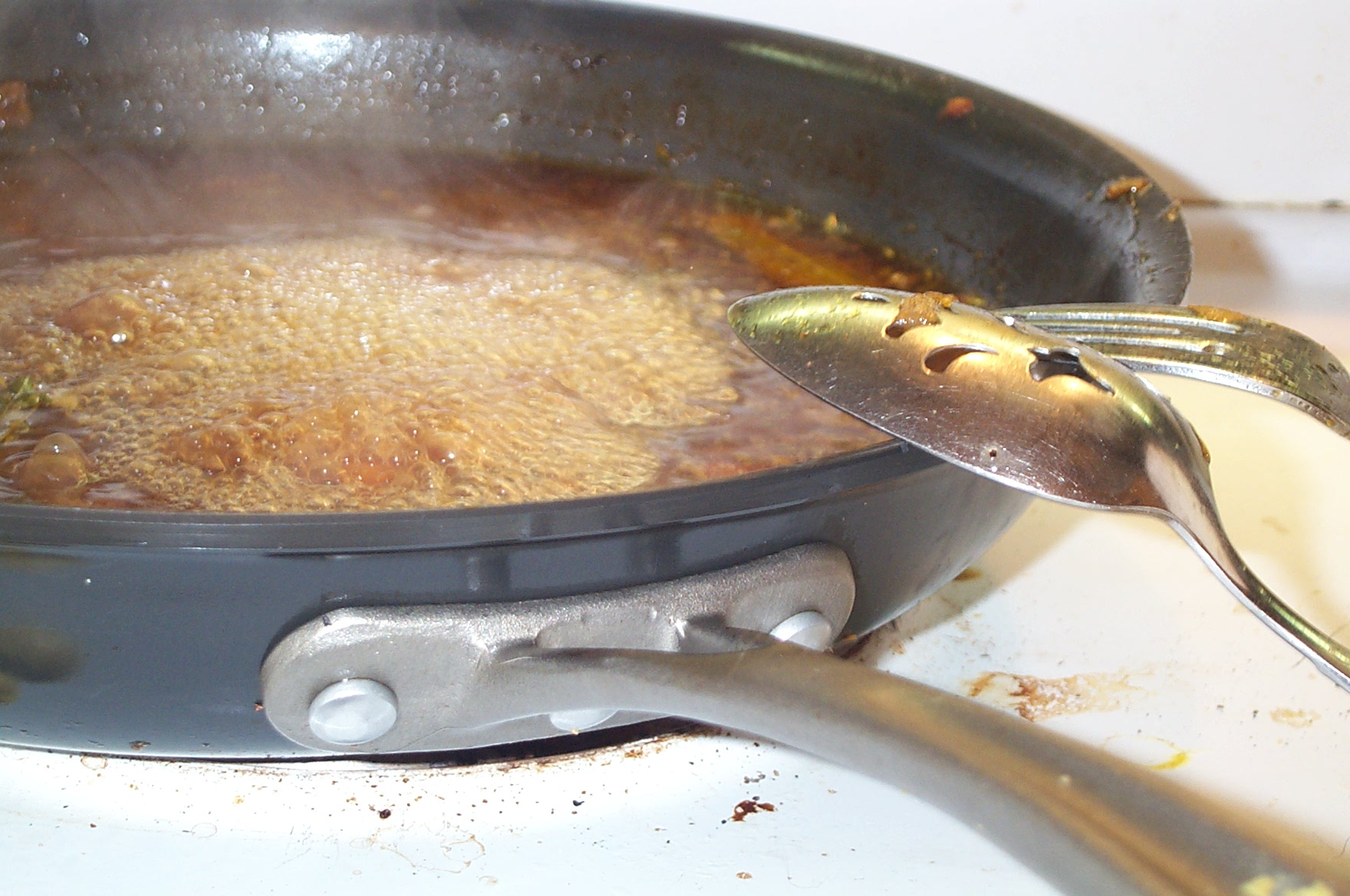
Stock being reduced in a pan

In cooking, reduction is the process of thickening and intensifying the flavor of a liquid mixture, such as a soup, sauce, wine or juice, by simmering or boiling.

Reduction is performed by simmering or boiling a liquid, such as a stock, fruit or vegetable juice, wine, vinegar or sauce, until the desired concentration is reached by evaporation. This is done without a lid, enabling the vapor to escape from the mixture. Different components of the liquid will evaporate at slightly different temperatures, and the goal of reduction is to drive away those with lowest points of evaporation.

While reduction does concentrate the flavors left in the pan, reducing too much will decrease the amount of all liquids in the sauce, and can leave a sticky, burnt coating on the pan if not stirred constantly.

Sauces, ranging from basic brown sauce to béchamel sauce and even tomato sauce, are simmered for long periods (from 1 to 10 hours) but not boiled. Simmering not only develops the maximum possible flavor, but also allows impurities to collect at the top and be skimmed off periodically as the sauce cooks. Boiling would diffuse the impurities into the liquid and result in a bitter taste and unclear stock. Broths are also simmered rather than boiled, and for the same reasons.

== Examples ==
Common preparations involving reductions include:

- Consommés, reduced and clarified stocks
- Gravies
- Gastriques, sauces involving both acidic and sweet components
- Pan sauces
- Syrups

== Processes ==
=== Evaporation of juice ===
When the pot is continuously heated on the stove, the moisture in the sauce will naturally evaporate into gas due to the high temperature, allowing the liquid at the bottom of the pot to dry. This is the most basic way of harvesting juice, and all kinds of dishes are common. This requires that the ingredients have been cooked, the pot is opened and turned on high heat, as far as possible to boil the water, let the sauce concentrate, before the ingredients must turn off the fire.

=== Harvesting juice with starch syrup ===
The starch is dissolved in water, and when it is pasteurized, it can increase the consistency of the soup, and it is also the most commonly used way in Chinese cuisine. The general form of starching is to use too white powder or corn flour, starch and cold water in a bowl, then pour the starch juice into the pot, and mix well with the water in the pot.

=== Sugar harvesting juice ===
Sugar harvest juice is to increase the sugar to increase the concentration of soup, so that the more it is boiled, the thicker it can be completed. Suitable for sweet dishes such as sweet and sour ribs and braised meat. The best time to harvest is before the dishes are cooked and ready to cook. When harvesting the juice, turn the heat and add more sugar than when seasoning, but the dosage should be controlled to prevent the taste from being too sweet; and always pay attention to the conditions in the pot. Starching for juice

=== Natural juice harvest ===
Natural juices are only available for collagen-rich ingredients such as pork skin, beef tendons, or pork feet. The connective tissue is mainly composed of collagen, in the process of heating, will gradually release sticky protein, fully dissolved into the soup, can form starch. It is similar to evaporating and harvesting juice, but instead of adding starchy water to the pot, it is heated and braised directly, allowing the gelatin to dissolve into the sauce and become sticky enough to wrap the ingredients.
