= Shijing River =

Small river in Fujian Province of China

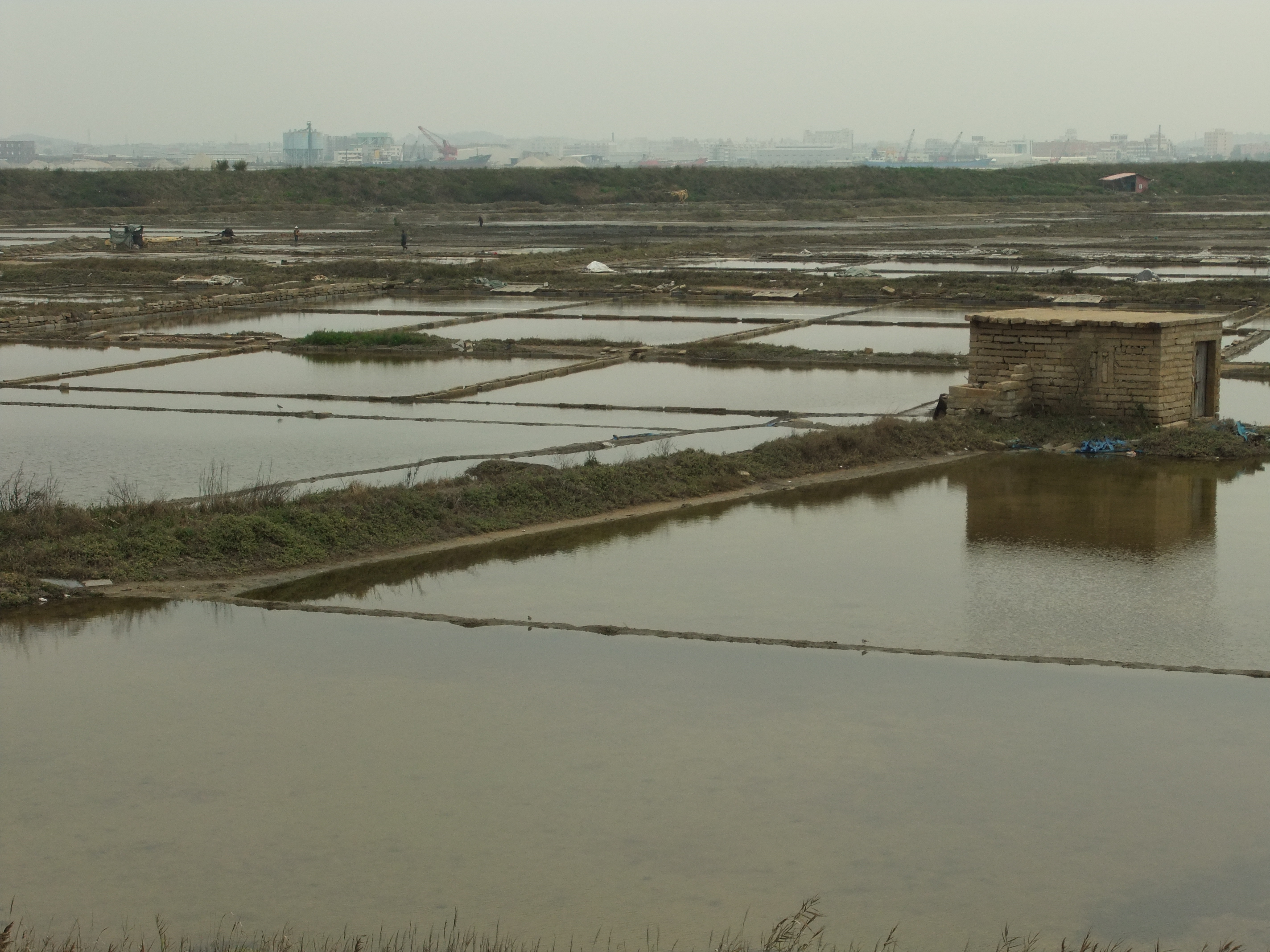
Shrimp farming ponds on the Anhai Bay

The Shijing River (Chinese: 石井江; pinyin: Shíjǐng Jiāng; Pe̍h-ōe-jī: Chio̍h-chíⁿ Kang) is a small river in the Fujian Province of China. The tidal estuary it forms when entering the Weitou Bay of the Taiwan Strait is known as the Anhai Bay (Chinese: 安海湾; pinyin: Ānhǎi Wān; Pe̍h-ōe-jī: Oaⁿ-hái-oân). Most of the Shijing River's basin is within the prefecture-level city of Quanzhou.

== Sources ==
The sources of the Shijing River are in the hilly area near the border of Quanzhou's Nan'an City and Xiamen's Xiang'an District. The Shibi Reservoir (石壁水库; dam at 24°45′41.4″N 118°21′29.3″E) constructed in 1955-1958 on the upper course of the Daying Stream (Chinese: 大盈溪; pinyin: Dàyíng Xī; Pe̍h-ōe-jī: Tāi-êng Khe) (one of the Shijing's tributaries) is used for irrigation and water supply in several towns within the county-level cities of Nan'an and Jinjiang. The reservoir also has a 1 MW hydroelectric plant.

== The lower course ==
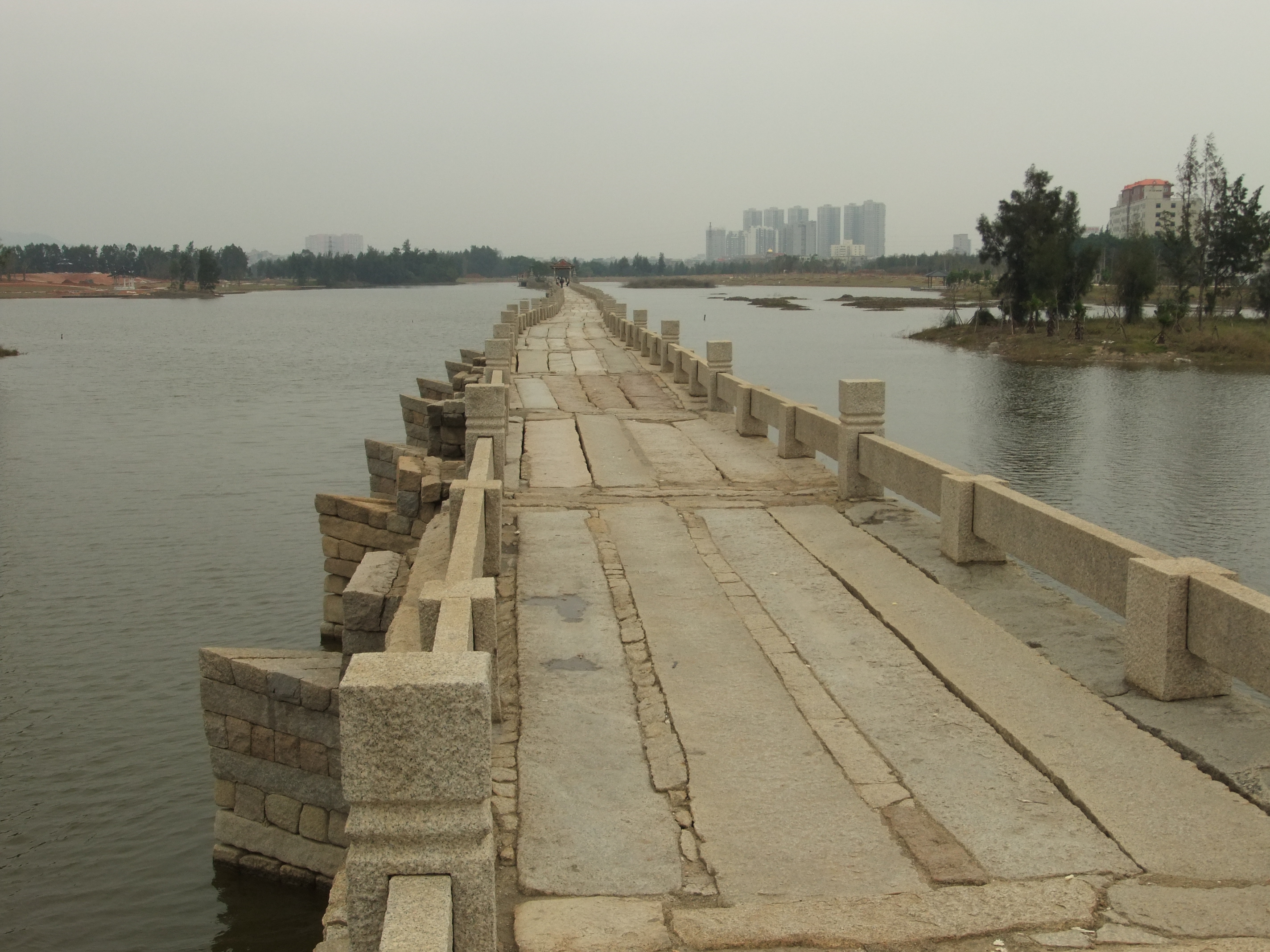
On the Anping Bridge

The lower course of the Shijing River, and the Anhai Bay, form the border between Quanzhou's two county-level units: Nan'an City in the west and Jinjiang City in the east. The riverside towns on the west (Nan'an) bank are Shuitou and Shijing, and on the east (Jinjiang) bank, Anhai and Dongshi.

The famous Song-era Anping Bridge originally spanned the shallow Shijing estuary between Anhai and Shuitou. Over the intervening nine centuries, this part of the estuary has silted up, so that the bridge (now fully restored) is now in a lake of sorts, almost completely surrounded by dry land on all sides.

== Anhai Bay ==
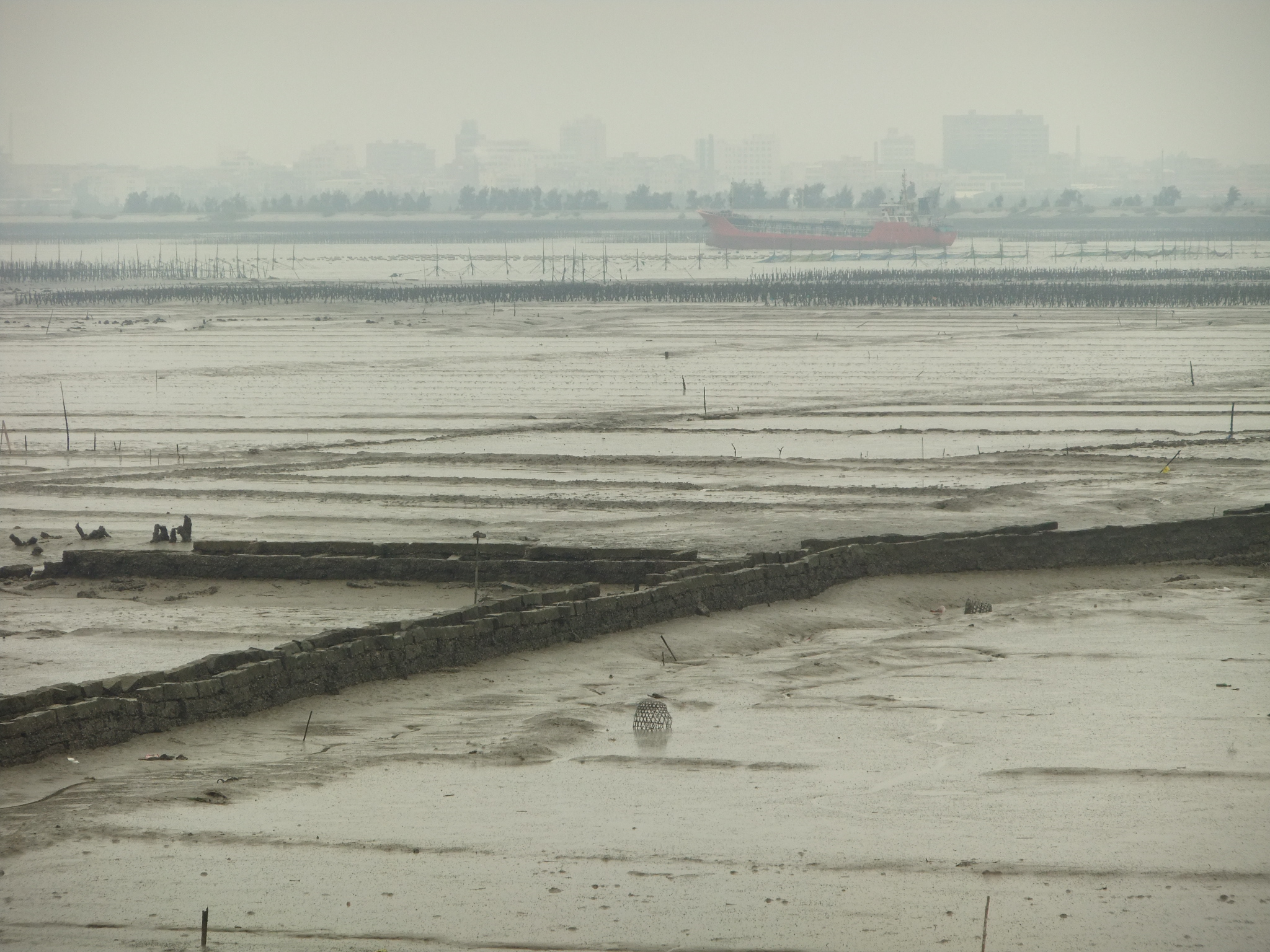
The mudflats along the western shore of the Anhai Bai are used for clam cultivation. Dongshi Town can be seen in the background

Further downstream, the Shijing River's estuary (the Anhai Bay) continues to exist. It is an important aquaculture area. As of ca. 2001, 138.5 hectares of the mudflats and water surface on the bay's western (Shuitou) side were used for aquaculture; this included 37.5 ha used for raising the blood cockles (Tegillarca granosa, 泥蚶), 58.3 ha used for the Chinese razor clam (Sinonovacula constricta, 缢蛏), 16.2 ha used for oyster farming, and 26.5 ha used for shrimp farming. Over 1400 people from Shuitou's Gangnei Village (巷内村) were employed in aquaculture and fishing.
