= Port of Meizhou Bay =

Port of Meizhou Bay 湄州湾港
- Click on the map for a fullscreen view

Location
- Country: People's Republic of China
- Location: Quanzhou, Fujian; Meizhou Island, Fujian; and Putian, Fujian
- UN/LOCODE: CNQZJ, CNSNH, CNWIT, CNXMG, CNQALN

Details
- No. of berths: 147

The Port of Meizhou Bay was created in 2012 by merging the ports of Quanzhou, Meizhou Island and Putian, as part of Fujian Province's rationalization of ports, which cutting down the number of ports in the province into three large consolidated ports (Xiamen, Meizhou Bay and Fuzhou). In 2012, Meizhou Bay port had 147 berths, 24 with 10,000DWT capacity, and had a total cargo throughput of 114 million tonnes.

Port of Quanzhou (Chinese: 泉州港) is a seaport with a number of facilities in Quanzhou prefecture-level city, in the southeastern part of Fujian province (Minnan), China. Its UN/LOCODE is CNQZJ.

== History ==
Port of Quanzhou was the busiest port during the era of the Tang dynasty. The port peaked in activity during the Yuan Dynasty. The medieval western travellers to China; Marco Polo, Ibn Battuta, Giovanni de' Marignolli, and Odoric all have transited through Quanzhou. Polo labelled it as one of world's the largest port and Battuta equated the port to the Port of Alexandria during the time.

The port has facilities in four bays of Taiwan Strait. They are Meizhou Bay, Quanzhou Bay, Shenhu Bay and Weitou Bay. It is managed by the Quanzhou Port Authority.

- Quanzhou Bay 泉州湾 24.840334°N 118.798256°E) - with facilities near Quanzhou's main urban area (Fengze District)
- Meizhou Bay 湄洲湾 (24.840334°N 118.798256°E) - with facilities in Quangang District
- Shenhu Bay 深沪湾 (24.629151°N 118.680539°E) - with facilities in Shenhu Town, Jingjiang City
- Weitou Bay 围头湾 (24.518213°N 118.575161°E) - with facilities in the towns of Shijing, Shuitou, and Anhai.
