= Cai Chongda =

Chinese writer

- 蔡崇達
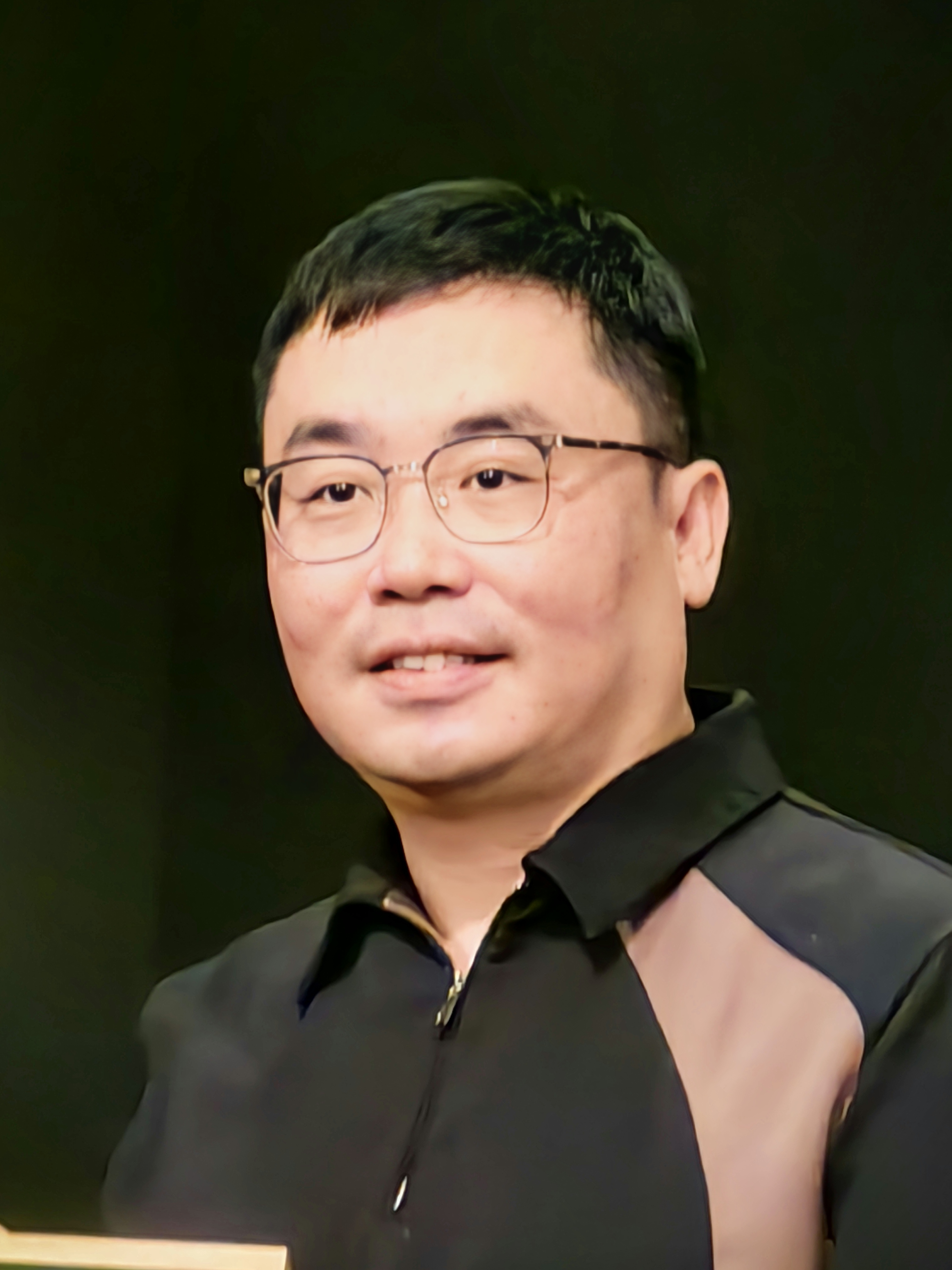
- Born: May 27, 1982 (age 44); Dongshi, Fujian, China
- Education: Quanzhou Normal University
- Occupations: Journalist; writer; editor
- Writing career
- Notable work: Vessel: A Memoir

Chinese name
- Chinese: 蔡崇達
Transcriptions
Standard Mandarin
- Hanyu Pinyin: Cài Chóngdá
Southern Min
- Hokkien POJ: Chhòa Chông-ta̍t

Cai Chongda (born May 27, 1982) is a Chinese journalist, magazine editor, and writer, best known for his memoir, Vessel: A Memoir (pinyin: Pínáng). He currently serves as the executive editor of China News Weekly.

== Biography ==
Cai Chonga was born on May 27, 1982, in the seaside town of Dongshi, Fujian, China to an underprivileged family. At the age of 16, he won first place at a national composition competition, and published a book the following year. He attended Quanzhou Normal University, and graduated with a bachelor's degree in 2004.

== Literary career ==
At 24, Cai became the News Editor of Modern Weekly, a Chinese magazine. At the age of 27, Cai became Director of Reporting at GQ China, becoming the youngest person to hold this position across GQ's 17 international branches. In 2015, he founded Magmode, a menswear brand.

In 2014, he published the essay collection, Pínáng (皮囊). The book became a bestseller in China, Hong Kong, and Taiwan, selling over 3 million copies in China. In 2021, it was translated by Dylan Levi King into English, published under the title Vessel: A Memoir. Vessel's film rights have since been purchased by Andy Lau, a Hong Kong actor.
