= Dongshi =

Dongshi may refer to

== Chinese place name ==
=== Fujian ===
- Dongshi, Fujian (东石镇), town in Jinjiang

=== Guangdong ===
- Dongshi, Guangdong (zh; 东石镇), town in Pingyuan County

=== Hubei ===
- Dongshi, Hubei (董市镇), town in Zhijiang

=== Sichuan ===
- Dongshi Township, Sichuan (zh; 东石乡), subdivision of Zitong County

=== Taiwan ===
- Dongshi, Taichung (東勢區), Taichung
- Dongshi, Chiayi (東石鄉), township in Chiayi County
- Dongshi, Yunlin (東勢鄉), township in Yunlin County
