= Ru Huang =

Ru Huang may refer to:

- Huang Ru (born 1969), Chinese engineer and president of Southeast University
- Ru-Chih Chow Huang (born 1932), Taiwanese-American biologist

== See also ==
- Cai Huang-ru (born 1987), Taiwanese actress, singer and television host
