= Xiangyun, Fujian =

Xiangyun 翔云镇
- Town
- Location in Fujian Xiangyun (China)
- Coordinates (Xiangyun Town government): 24°57′51″N 118°10′00″E
- Country: People's Republic of China
- Province: Fujian
- Prefecture-level city: Quanzhou
- County-level city: Nan'an

Area
  - Total: 69.00 km^{2} (26.64 sq mi)

Population (2010)
  - Total: 15,181
  - Density: 220.0/km^{2} (569.8/sq mi)
- Time zone: UTC+8 (China Standard)

Xiangyun (simplified Chinese: 翔云镇; traditional Chinese: 翔雲鎮; pinyin: Xiángyún Zhèn; Pe̍h-ōe-jī: Siông-hûn-tìn) is a town in Nan'an city, in southern Fujian province, China. The town spans an area of 69.00 square kilometres (26.64 sq mi), is home to 15,181 permanent residents as of 2010, and has a hukou population of 28,892 as of 2018.

== Etymology ==
The town got its name from the nearby Xiangyun Mountain (Chinese: 象运山; pinyin: Xiàngyùn Shān; Pe̍h-ōe-jī: Siōng-ūn-soaⁿ), which, according to a local legend, attained its name due to looking like an elephant running through the clouds. During the Song dynasty, the mountain's name transformed to the similarly sounding Xiangyun Mountain (Chinese: 翔云山; pinyin: Xiángyún Shān; Pe̍h-ōe-jī: Siông-hûn-soaⁿ), which the town is still named for.

== Geography ==
Xiangyun is located in northwestern Nan'an city, 35 kilometers away from the city's urban center. The terrain is mainly mountainous, with many man-made terraces. Xiangyun has an subtropical oceanic monsoon climate. The town's elevation averages more than 600 meters above sea level, with the highest peak, Genting Hill, reaching 1175 meters in altitude. The town's three main rivers are the Huangtian Creek (Chinese: 黄田溪; Pe̍h-ōe-jī: N̂g-chhân-khoe), the Xiangyun Creek (Chinese: 翔云溪; Pe̍h-ōe-jī: Siông-hûn-khoe), and the Chi Creek (Chinese: 赤溪; Pe̍h-ōe-jī: Chhiah-khoe).

== History ==
Xiangyun cultivation and processing of tea has a long history, Jiao Ling tea, specialty and rock onions, sour bamboo shoots, water bamboo and so on.

Xiangyun Township was established in 1928, under the Republic of China, and was upgraded to a district in 1946. Xiangyun township was one of the first parts of Nan'an to fall under control of the Communist Party.

In 1956, the township was reorganized as part of the Yingdu Commune.

By the end of 1970, Xiangyun was reorganized as its own commune.

In 1984, Xiangyun became a township.

In the beginning of 1992, Xiangyun was re-designated as a town.

== Administrative divisions ==
Xiangyun is divided into 12 villages: Xiangyun Village, Jin'an Village, Futing Village, Shaxi Village, Meizhuang Village, Zhenlin Village, Huangtian Village, Jiaoling Village, Xiangshan Village, Yunshan Village, Dongshan Village, and Toumei Village.

== Demographics ==
In 1996, Xiangyun had a population of approximately 25,000 people. During the 2000 Chinese census, Xiangyun had a population of 20,937 people, which increased to 26,664 by the end of 2003. At the time of the 2010 Chinese census, the town had a population of 15,181 people. As of 2018, Xiangyun has a hukou population of 28,892.

== Economy ==
In 2018, the town had 12.597 million Yuan of industrial and commercial revenue, and 382 million Yuan of fixed-asset investment.

By the end of 1998, the town's GDP totaled 9.9 million yuan, a year-on-year increase of 15.3%. Agricultural output for that year totaled 39.4 million yuan, an increase of 9.0%, and industrial output totaled 137.76 million yuan, a 17.0% increase. Total output value of the town's enterprises totaled 209.94 million yuan, an increase of 18.8%, and turned over 89.1 million yuan of business revenue, an increase of 18.8%. In 1998, the town's finance income totaled 110 million yuan, which was an increase of 10%, and farmers per capita net income totaled 3200 yuan, an increase of 6.7%.

=== Agriculture ===
In 2018, Xiangyun Town has 909.64 hectares of arable land, with the two main crops of the town being rice and sweet potatoes. In 2018, the town produced 5,908 tons of rice, 648 tons of sweet potatoes, 1,868 tons of "Taiwanese fruits", 21 tons of "rock onions", 31 tons of bamboo shoots, and 646 tons of wild rice. The town also conducts a considerable amount of animal husbandry, which includes pigs, chickens, ducks, cows, goats, and rabbits.

The town also has developed a forestry industry, a center for tea production, and a center for olive production.

=== Industry ===
Xiangyun has 12 existing hydropower stations, with an installed capacity of 5060 kilowatts, and an annual generation capacity of 15 million degrees.

The town is also home to the Shibawan industrial district, which hosts a number of labor-intensive industries, including clothing and footwear factories.

== Education ==
The town has six schools: Xiangyun Central Kindergarten, Xiangyun Central Primary School, Futing Primary School, Xiangshan Primary School, Shaxi Teaching School, and Xiangyun Middle School.

== Culture ==
The town's two main monuments are Longxu Rock (龙须岩) and the Martyrs' Monument (烈士纪念碑).

Every February there is a large is a traditional feast, which has been taking place for over 1,000 years. The feast traditionally coincides with mass weddings.

After planting seeds, the town's farmers typically "wash" the soil for better harvests.

The town also abides by historical and traditional customs set up for a period of Wei (market).

Typical hospitality in the town involves serving guests tea, fried eggs, mushrooms, meat, noodles, and other small tokens.

Worship, "Jiao", is performed to thank Buddhist spirits by sacrificing a pig and performing a drama for the appreciation of the spirits. This form of worship is typically held alongside a feast, and is typically held every few years.

== See also ==
- Nan'an, Fujian
- Fujian province
- Quanzhou
- Shijing, Fujian
