= Zhang Guangjun =

Zhang Guangjun, may refer to:

- Zhang Guangjun (politician, born 1965) (born 1965), Chinese engineer and politician; current Vice Minister of Science and Technology, in office since November 2021
- Zhang Guangjun (politician, born 1968) (born 1968), Chinese politician; currently a deputy head of the Organization Department of the Chinese Communist Party
- Zhang Guangjun (judoka) (born 1975), Chinese judoka
