= Anping Bridge =

Stone beam bridge in Fujian, China

Anping Bridge 安平桥
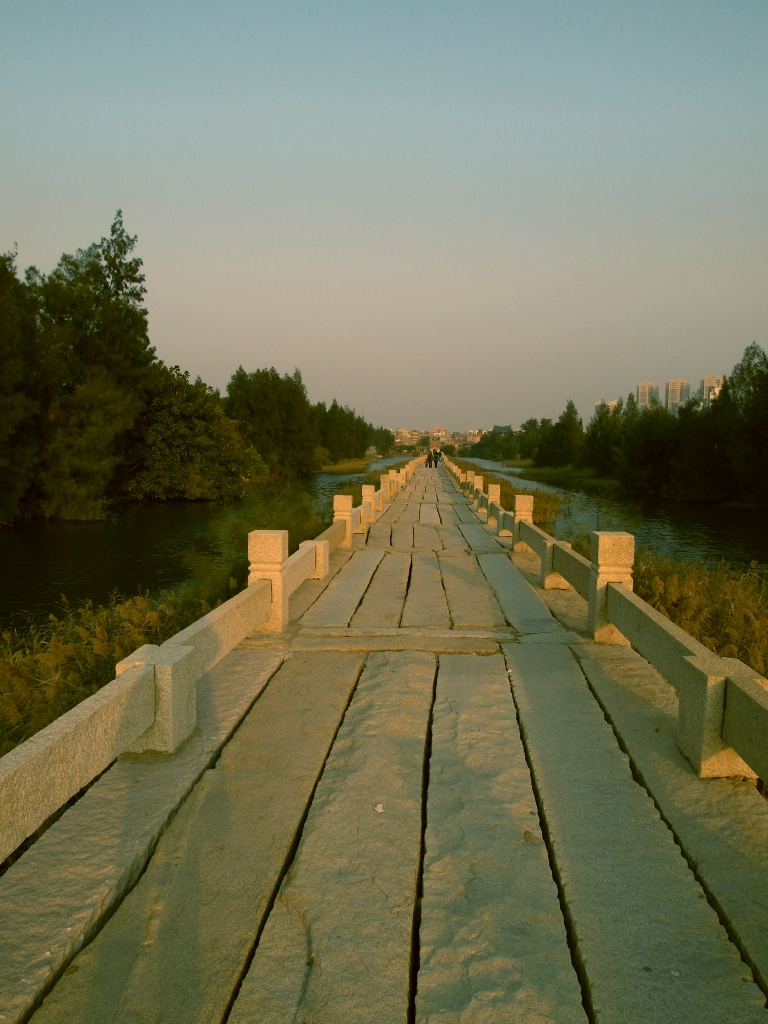
- Anping Bridge, with Anhai Town in the far background
- Coordinates: 24°42′40″N 118°27′00″E
- Crosses: Shijing River
- Locale: Quanzhou, Fujian, China

Characteristics
- Design: Beam bridge
- Material: Stone
- Total length: 2,070 metres (6,790 ft)
- Width: 3 to 3.8 metres (9.8 to 12.5 ft)
- No. of spans: 331

History
- Construction start: 1138
- Construction end: 1151

UNESCO World Heritage Site
- Location: China
- Part of: Quanzhou: Emporium of the World in Song-Yuan China
- Criteria: Cultural: (iv)
- Reference: 1561
- Inscription: 2021 (44th Session)

Location
- Interactive map of Anping Bridge

Anping Bridge (simplified Chinese: 安平桥; traditional Chinese: 安平橋; pinyin: Ānpíng Qiáo; Pe̍h-ōe-jī: An-pêng Kiô) is a Song dynasty stone beam bridge in Fujian province. It is 2,070 metres (1.29 mi) long. The bridge is also known as the Wuli Bridge (simplified Chinese: 五里桥; traditional Chinese: 五里橋; pinyin: Wǔ Lǐ Qiáo; Pe̍h-ōe-jī: Gō͘-lí-kiô, literally Five Li Bridge) because its length is about 5 li, where a li is about 500 meters or 0.3 miles. It is a nationally protected historic site registered with the National Cultural Heritage Administration.

The bridge lies in the prefecture-level city of Quanzhou, crossing what originally was a tidal estuary of the Shijing River that separates the town of Anhai (in the county-level city of Jinjiang) east of the river, from the town of Shuitou (in the county-level city of Nan'an) west of the river. The bridge is named after Anhai, which was formerly known as Anping.

Anping Bridge consists of 331 spans of granite beams resting on top of stone piers, the largest beam weighing 25 tons. The width of the bridge varies from 3 to 3.8 metres (9.8 to 12.5 ft). It originally had five pavilions where travelers could rest; however, only one pavilion (Shuixin Pavilion) still exists.

In 2021, Anping Bridge was inscribed on the UNESCO World Heritage List along with other Song dynasty sites around Quanzhou because of its importance to medieval maritime trade in China and the exchange of cultures and ideas around the world.

== History ==
Construction of the bridge started in 1138 during the Southern Song dynasty and lasted until 1151. It was originally 811 zhang [2,223 metres (1.381 mi)] long and 1.6 zhang [4.4 metres (14 ft)] wide, with 362 spans. Upon completion, it was the longest bridge in China until 1905, inspiring the local description, "No bridge in the world is as long as this one" (simplified Chinese: 天下无桥长此桥; traditional Chinese: 天下無橋長此橋; Pe̍h-ōe-jī: Thian-hā bû kiô tn̂g chhú-kiô). There have been six major repairs since its opening, and the bridge is now shorter due to silting of the estuary. During the Song and Yuan periods (10th to 14th centuries), this bridge connected sites of ceramic and iron production in the hinterland to Quanzhou, where the items would be sold around the world.

== Current conditions ==
The estuary of the Shijing River has mostly silted up in this area, and the remaining river channel under the bridge is fairly narrow. Consequently, the bridge now mostly crosses what amounts to a sequence of lakes or ponds, separated by wetlands. A modern public highway crosses the Shijing River a few hundred meters south (downstream) of the historical Anping Bridge over a fairly short bridge. The areas around the bridge are being developed into parks.

== See also ==
- List of bridges in China
