= Xiangyang Township, Fujian =

Xiangyang Township 向阳乡
- Township
- Location in Fujian Xiangyang Township (China)
- Coordinates: 25.2696°N 118.4880°E
- Country: People's Republic of China
- Province: Fujian
- Prefecture-level city: Quanzhou
- County-level city: Nan'an
- Time zone: UTC+8 (China Standard)

Xiangyang Township (simplified Chinese: 向阳乡; traditional Chinese: 向陽鄉; pinyin: Xiàngyáng Xiāng; Pe̍h-ōe-jī: Hiòng-iông-hiong) is a township under the administration of Nan'an, Fujian, China. As of 2018, it has 7 villages under its administration.
