= Shuitou, Fujian =

Shuitou 水头镇
- Town
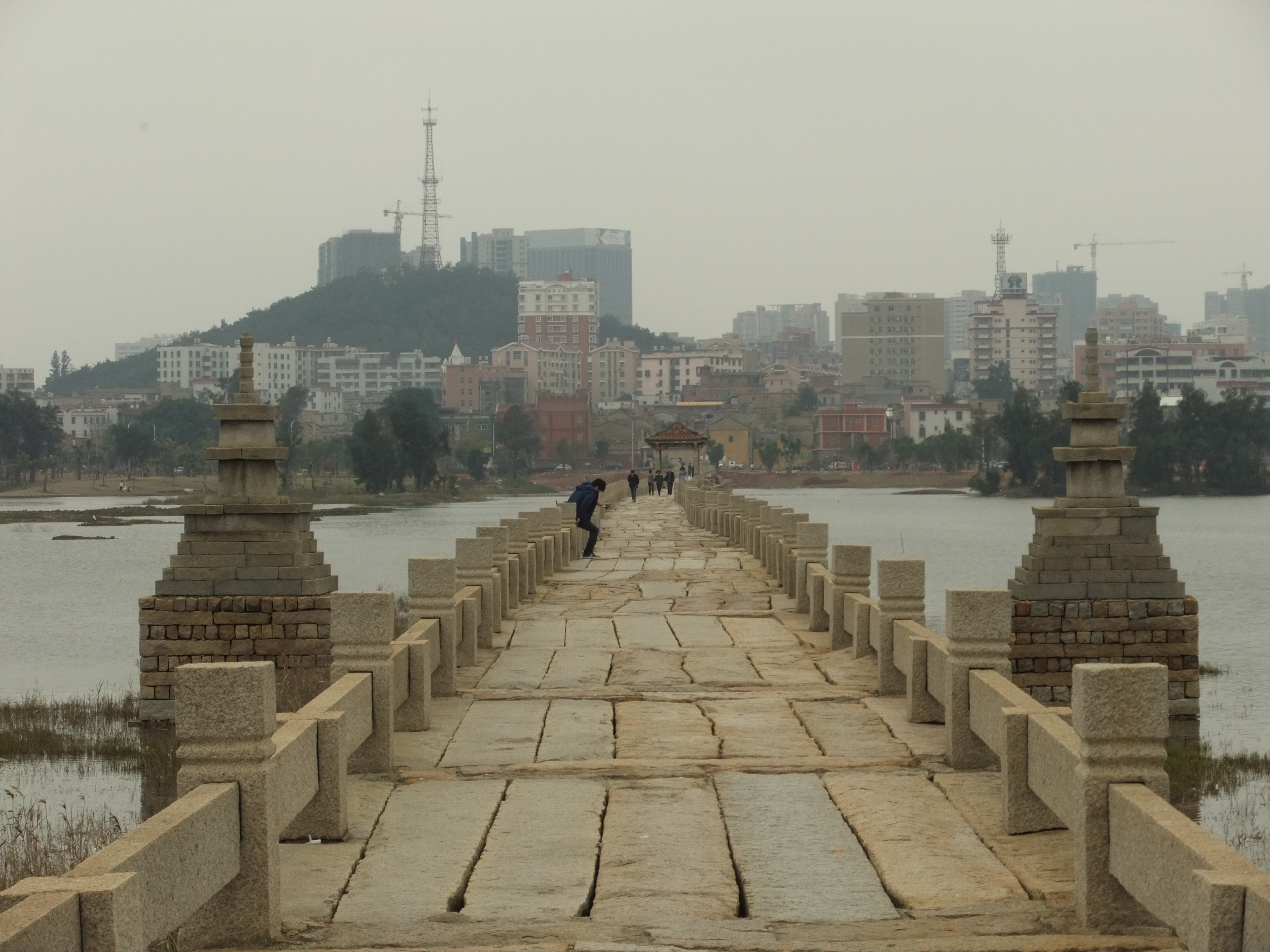
- A view of Shuitou Town from Anping Bridge

- Location in Fujian Shuitou (China)
- Coordinates: 24°42′27″N 118°26′07″E
- Country: People's Republic of China
- Province: Fujian
- Prefecture-level city: Quanzhou
- County: Nan'an
- Time zone: UTC+8 (China Standard)
- Postal code: 362300
- Area code: 0595

Shuitou (simplified Chinese: 水头; traditional Chinese: 水頭; pinyin: Shuǐtóu; Pe̍h-ōe-jī: Chúi-thâu; lit. 'water head') is a town (a township-level division) of Nan'an City, in southern Fujian province, China.

Shuitou is located on the western side of the Shijing River and its estuary, the Anhai Bay (安海湾). It is connected to its eastern neighbor, the town of Anhai, by the famous ancient five-li-long Anping Bridge, built from large (some almost 10 meters long) slabs of stone. There is also a modern road to Anhai (and on to Jinjiang City and Quanzhou), which has a much shorter bridge over the Shijing, as the estuary has largely silted up over a thousand of years since the old bridge was built.

== Economy ==
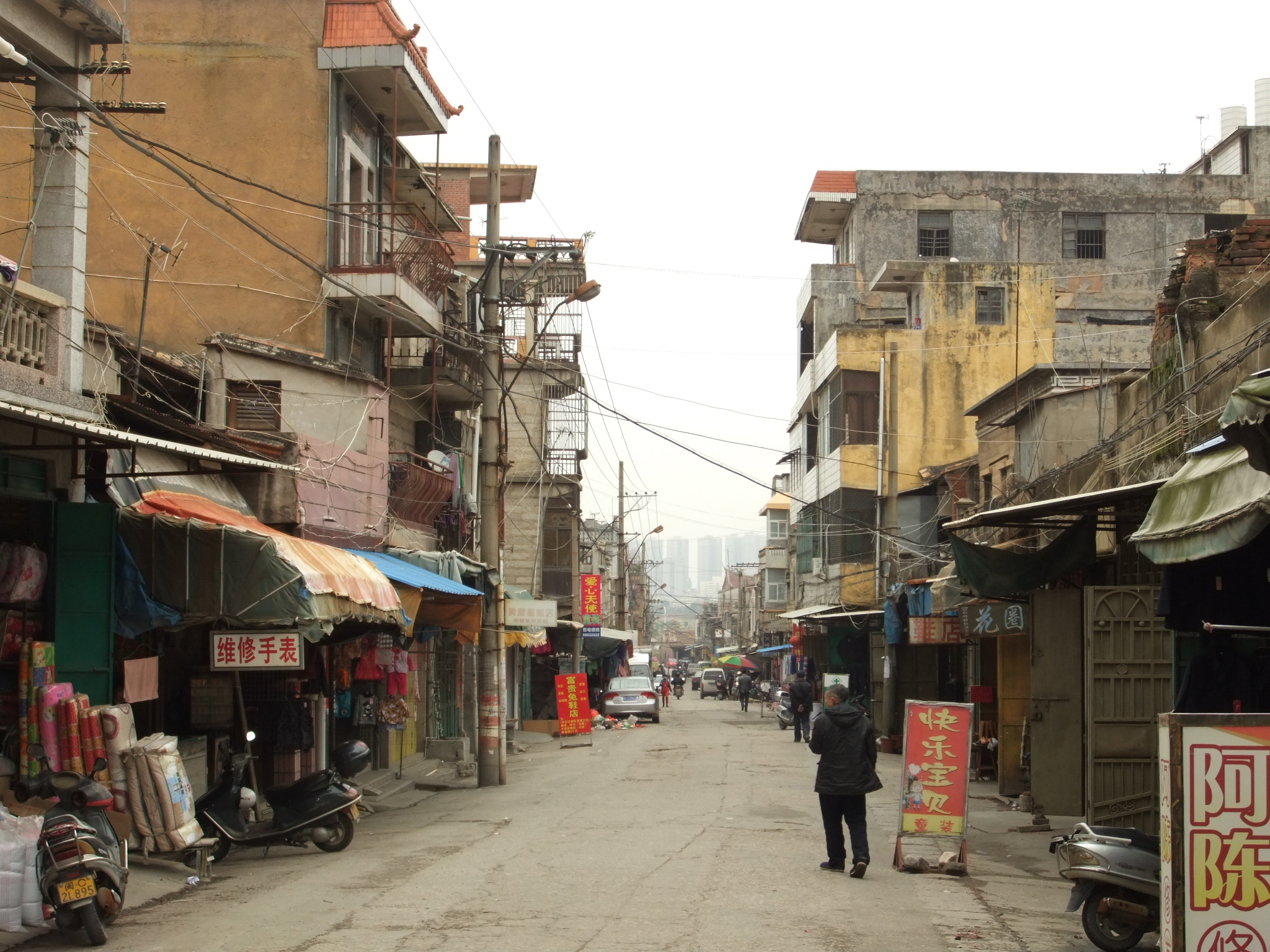
An old shopping street in Shuitou Town, leading to Anping Bridge

Shuitou, similarly to its southern neighbor, Shijing, has a significant stone-working industry.

There is a fair amount of new economic development in town, some of it connected to the trade with Taiwan.

Aquaculture is practiced on the Anhai Bay (the estuary of the Shijing River). As of ca. 2001, 138.5 hectares of the bay's mudflats and water surface were used for aquaculture; this included 37.5 ha used for raising the blood cockles (Tegillarca granosa, 泥蚶), 58.3 ha used for the Chinese razor clam (Sinonovacula constricta, 缢蛏), 16.2 ha used for oyster farming, and 26.5 ha used for shrimp farming. Over 1400 people from Shuitou's Gangnei Village (巷内村) were employed in aquaculture and fishing.

== See also ==
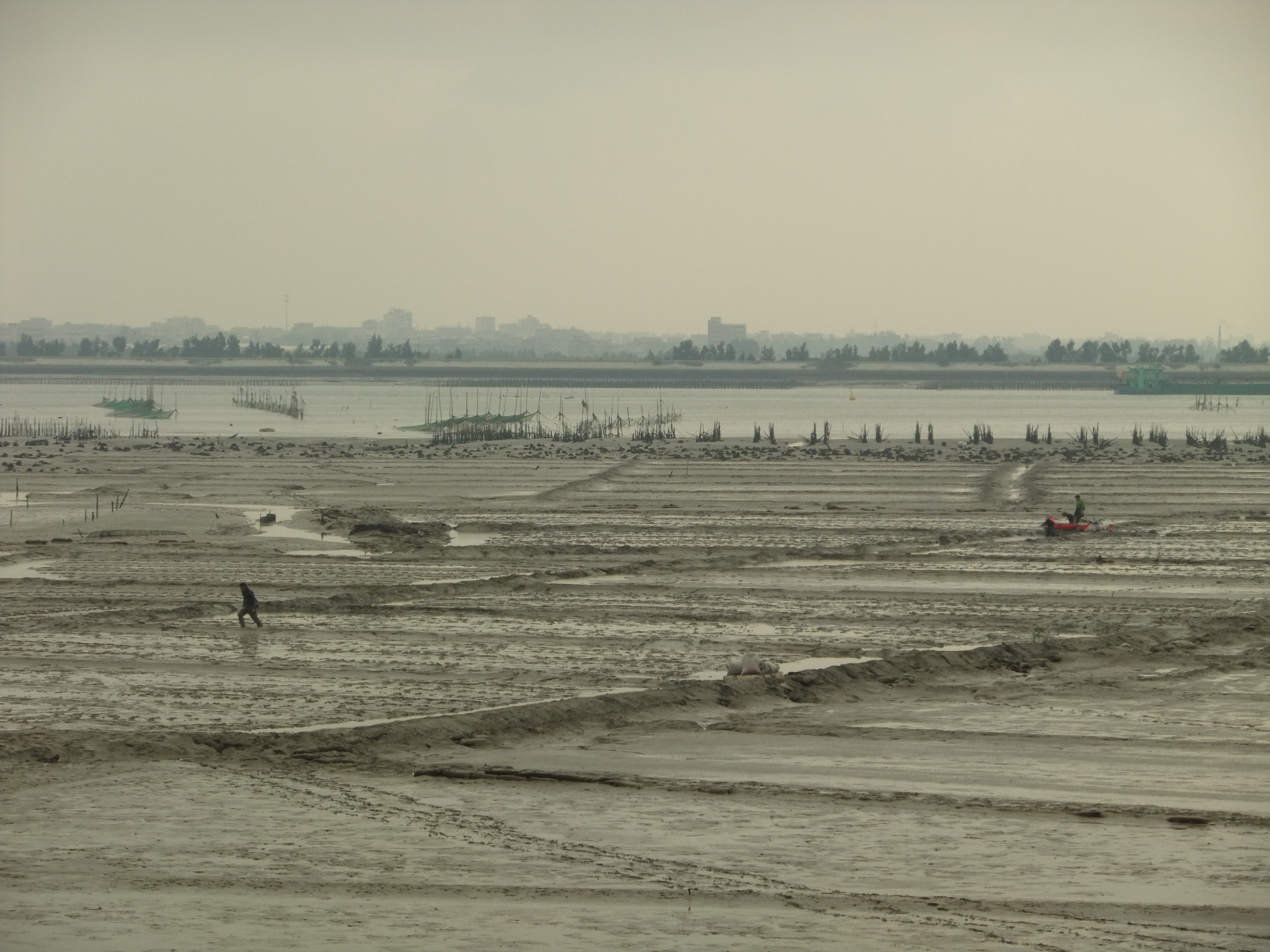
Clam and oyster plantations in Shuitou's Anhai Bay

- List of township-level divisions of Fujian
