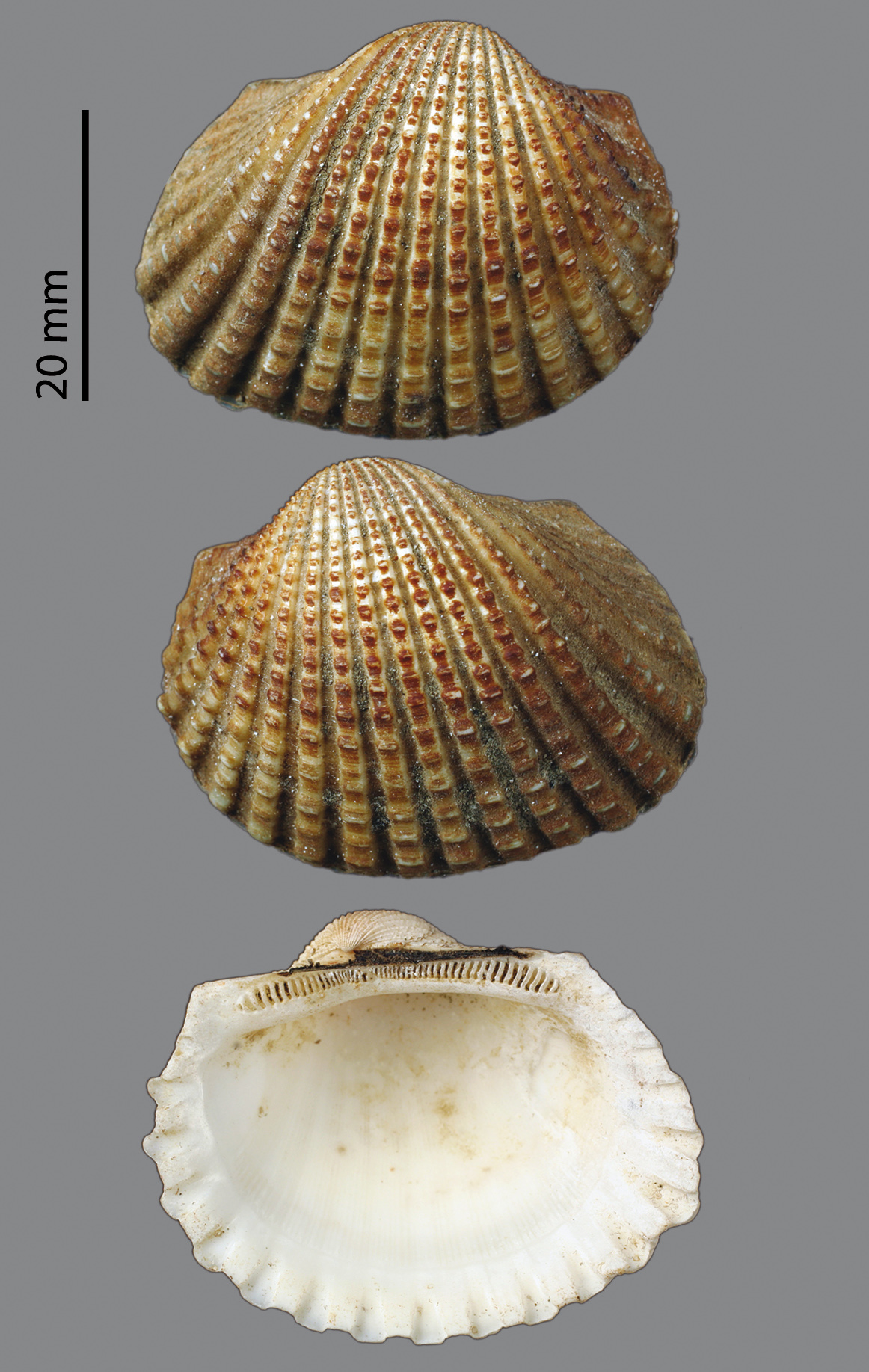
- Shell of Tegillarca granosa (specimen at MNHN, Paris)

Scientific classification
- Kingdom: Animalia
- Phylum: Mollusca
- Class: Bivalvia
- Order: Arcida
- Family: Arcidae
- Genus: Tegillarca
- Species: T. granosa

Binomial name
- Tegillarca granosa (Linnaeus, 1758)

Synonyms
- Anadara bisenensis Schrenck & Reinhart, 1938; Anadara granosa (Linnaeus, 1758); Anadara thackwayi Iredale, 1927; Anomalocardia pulchella Dunker, 1868; Arca aculeata Bruguière, 1789; Arca corbicula Gmelin, 1791; Arca corbula Dillwyn, 1817; Arca granosa (Linnaeus, 1758); Arca granosa kamakuraensis Noda, 1966; Arca nodulosa Lightfoot, 1786 (invalid: junior homonym of Arca nodulosa O. F. Müller, 1776); Arca obessa Kotaka, 1953; Tegillarca granosa bessalis Iredale, 1939

= Tegillarca granosa =

Species of bivalve

Tegillarca granosa (also known as Anadara granosa) is a species of ark clam commonly known as the blood cockle or blood clam due to the red haemoglobin liquid inside the soft tissues. It is found throughout the Indo-Pacific region from the eastern coast of South Africa northwards and eastwards to Southeast Asia, Australia, Polynesia, and up to northern Japan. It lives mainly in the intertidal zone at one to two metres water depth, burrowed down into sand or mud. Adult size is about 5 to 6 cm long and 4 to 5 cm wide.

== Anatomy ==
The shell of the blood cockle is adapted for its burrowing lifestyle.

- Shape and Size: The shell is equivalved (both valves are the same size), thick, solid, and strongly inflated, giving it a rounded, ovate shape. Adults typically reach 5-6 cm in length .
- Ornamentation: A key identifying feature is the presence of 15 to 20 broad, radial ribs on each valve. These ribs are often covered with distinct, small knobs or beads (giving it the common name "blood cockle" in some regions) .
- Coloration: The shell is covered by a dark brown or blackish periostracum (the organic outer layer). A characteristic feature is a diamond-shaped, dark brown or black patch located just below the umbones (the beak-like projections). The inside of the shell is white, sometimes with a purple hue.
- Hinge and Margin: The hinge area (where the two valves meet) is long and straight, containing a row of numerous small, interlocking "teeth" (taxodont dentition). T. granosa can have about 35 of these small teeth. The inner margin of the shell has small crenulations or notches (around 18) that correspond with the external radial ribs.
Right and left valve of the same specimen:

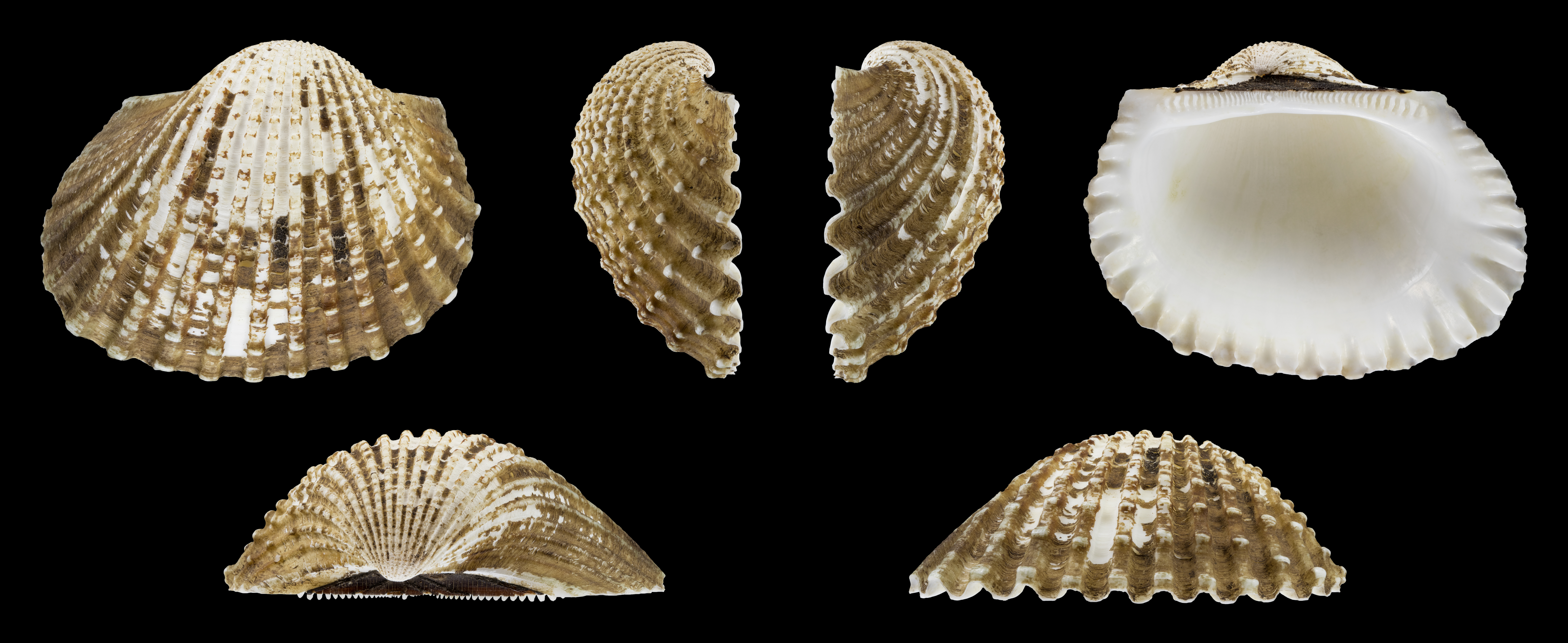
Right valve

Left valve

== Human use ==
=== Aquaculture ===
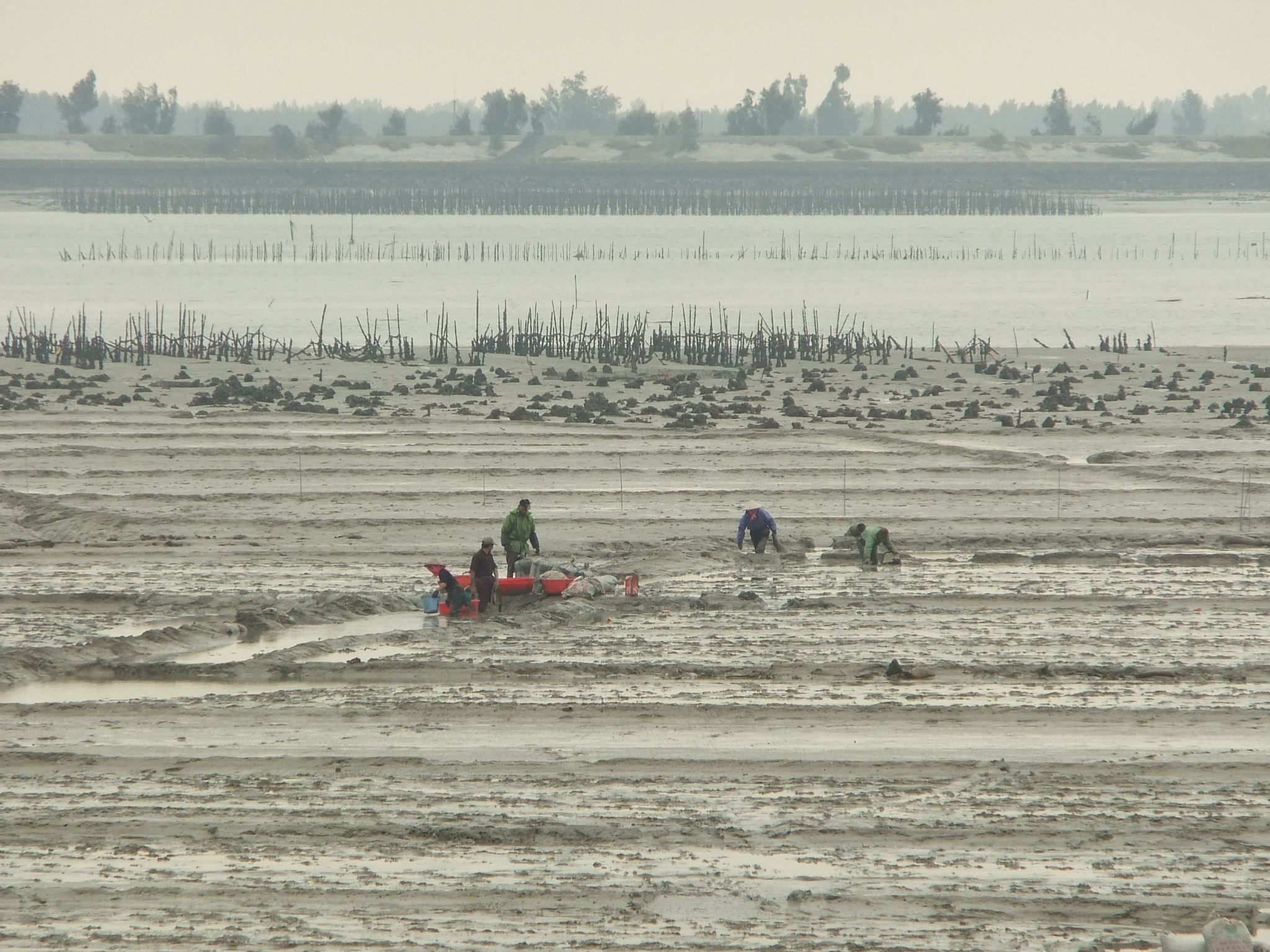
The blood cockle is the main clam variety raised in the mud flats of Anhai Bay off Shuitou, Fujian.

Wild capture (blue) and aquaculture (green) production of blood cockle (Tegillarca granosa) in thousand tonnes from 1950 to 2022, as reported by the FAO

It has a high economic value as food, and it is aquacultured. On the coast of Zhejiang Province alone, blood cockle plantations occupy around 145,000 mu (about 100 km^{2}) of mudflats. These clams are raised in the river estuaries of the neighboring Fujian Province as well.

=== Culinary use ===
China

Blood cockles are commonly consumed in coastal China particularly in the Yangtze River region.

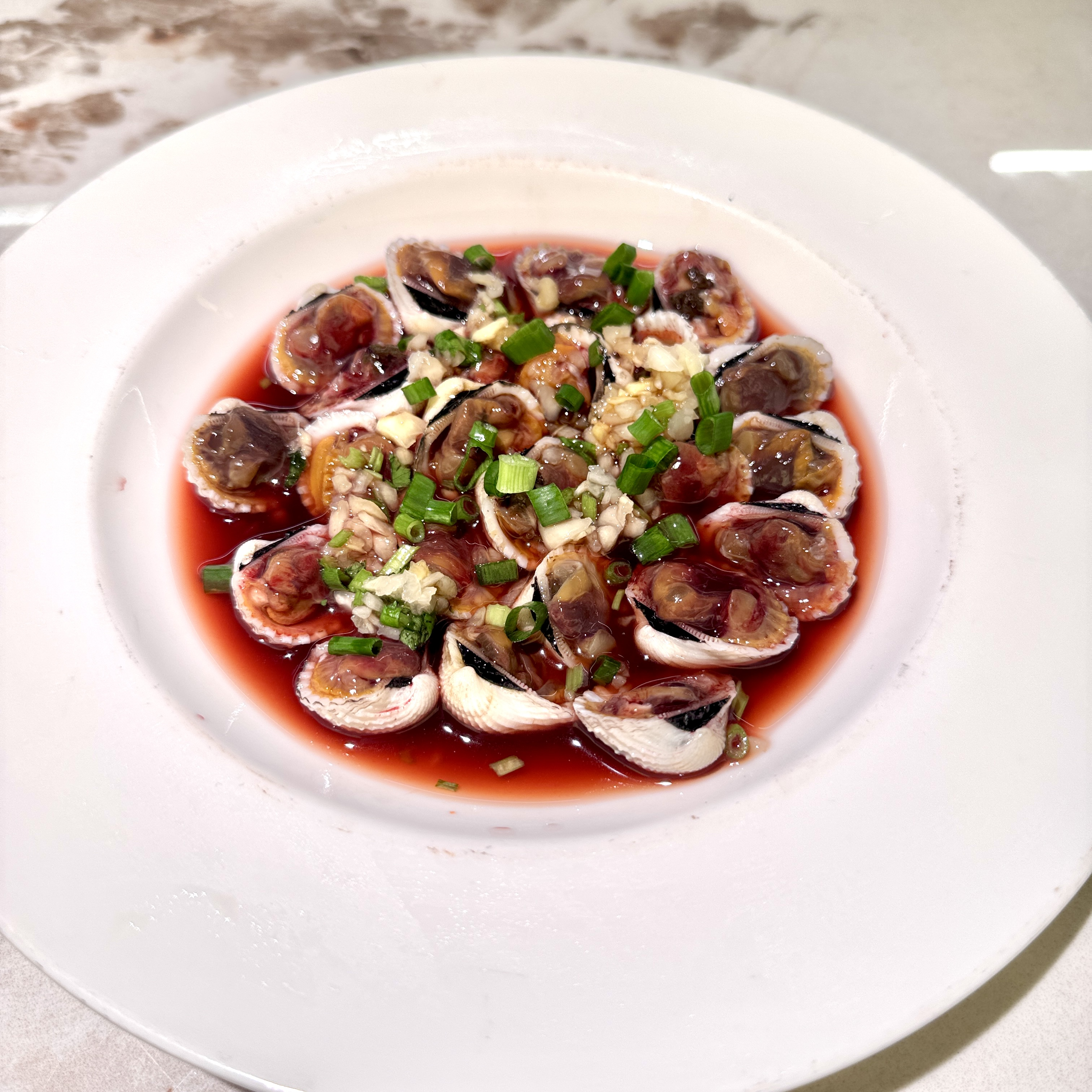
Blood cockles are a common dish in Ningbo, Zhejiang, China

Korea

In Korea, blood cockles are called kkomak (꼬막) and are cooked and seasoned with soy sauce, chili powder, and sesame oil.

Preparations of Kkomak

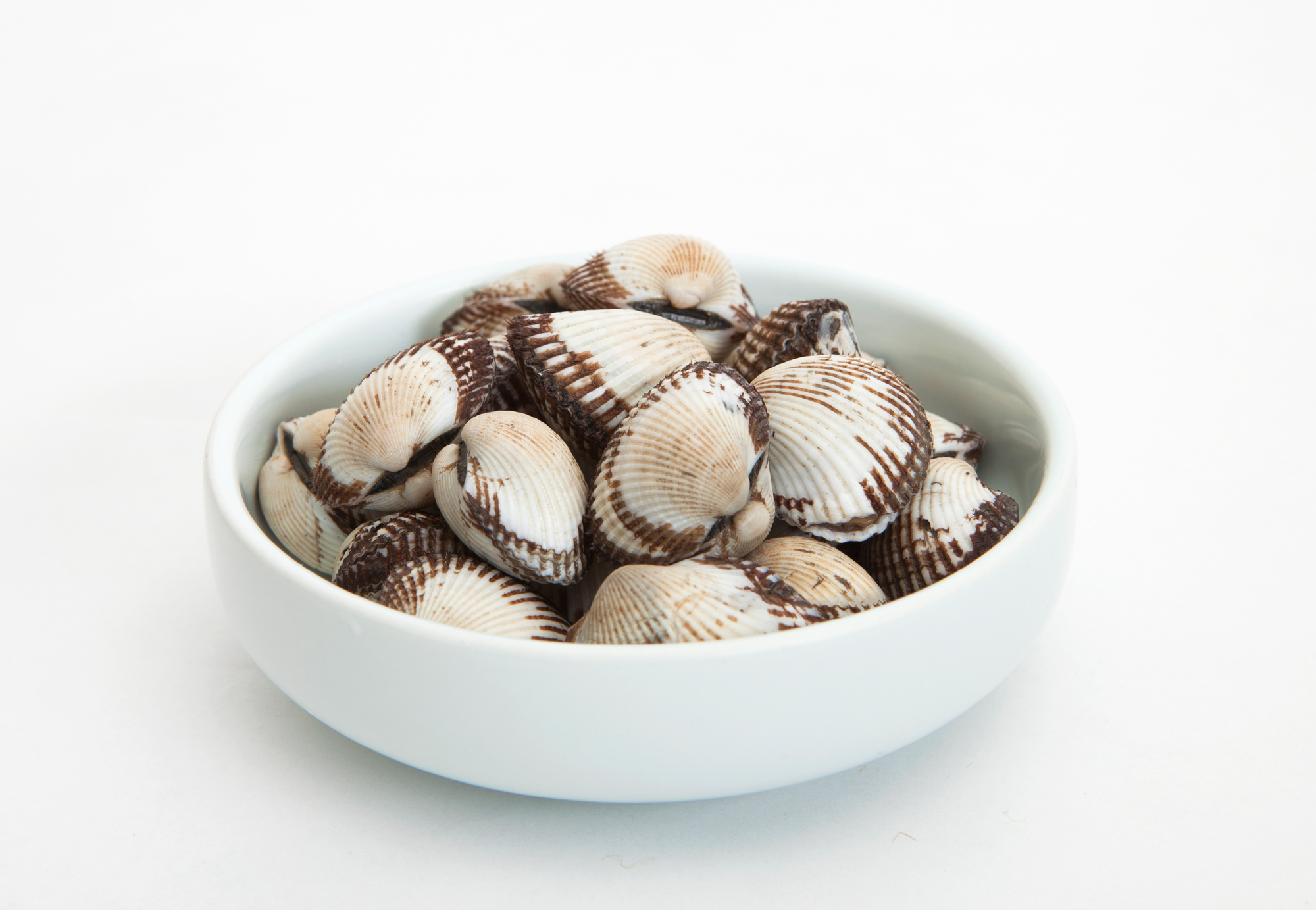
Unprepared kkomak (blood cockles)

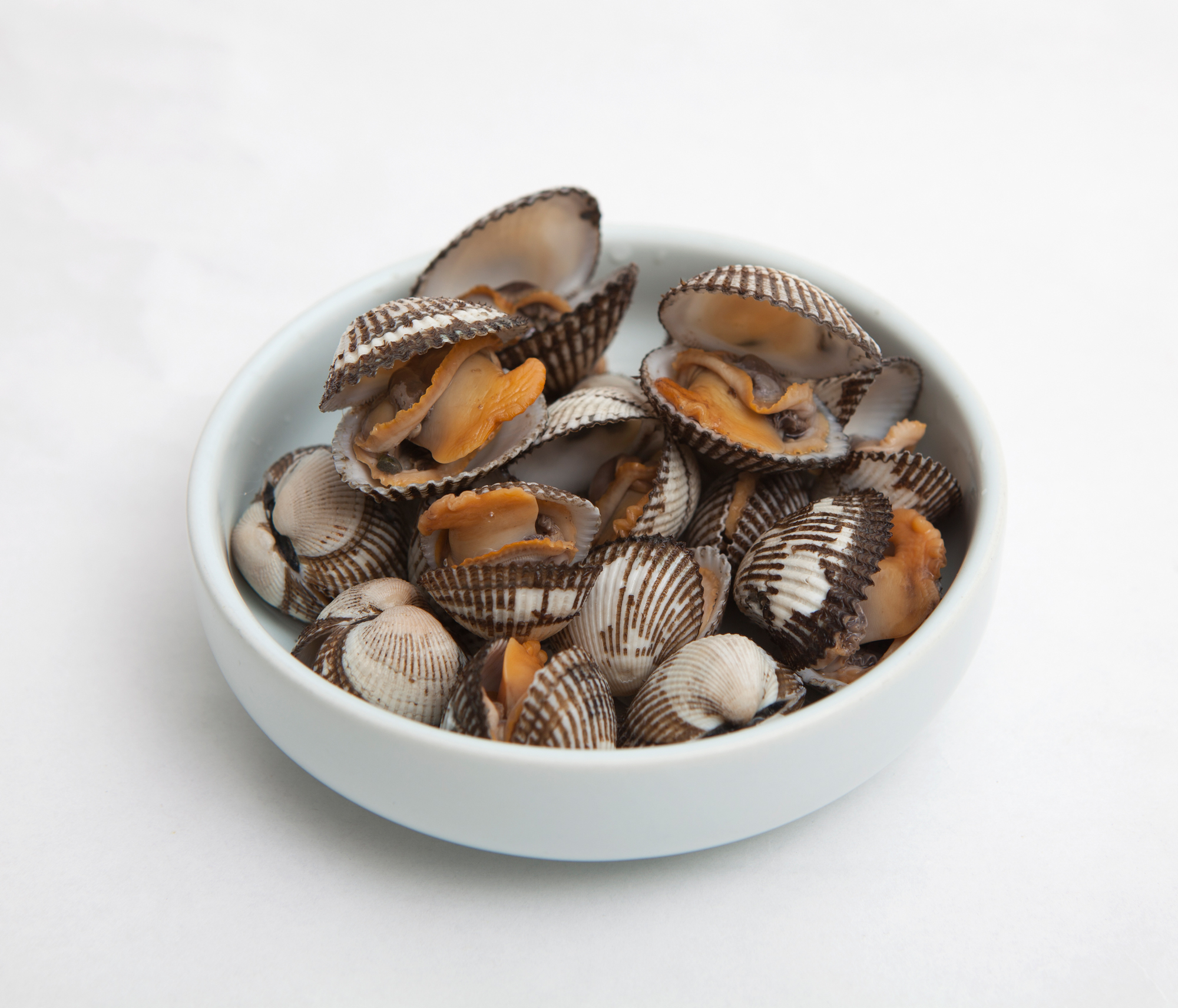
Prepared kkomak (blood cockles)

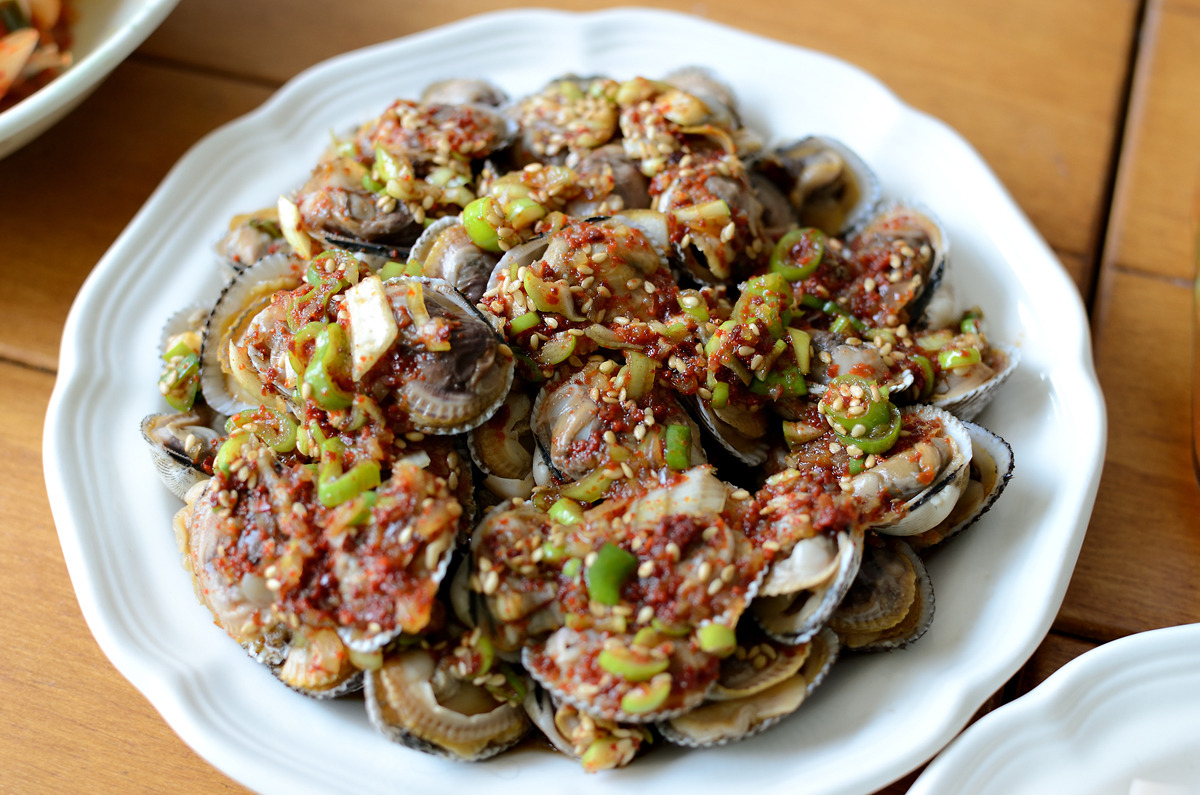
Kkomak-muchim (seasoned blood cockles)

Indonesia

In Indonesia, blood cockles (local: kerang darah) are quite popular food and are served as various dishes including boiled, deep fried or sauteed.

Thailand

In Thailand, they are known as hoi kraeng (Thai: หอยแครง), presumably a corruption of the common Indonesian name. In Thai cuisine, they are usually boiled and eaten with a spicy and sour dipping sauce like other types of seafood.

==== Safety ====
Some sources of blood cockle may not undergo the depuration process. Therefore, certain styles of preparation, such as the poaching commonly carried out in Shanghai, can leave many pathogens present. A 2014 study found that blood cockles collected from the Sabang River in Asajaya, Sarawak, Malaysia, contained cadmium and lead levels exceeding Malaysian food safety regulations, indicating potential health risks from long-term consumption.
