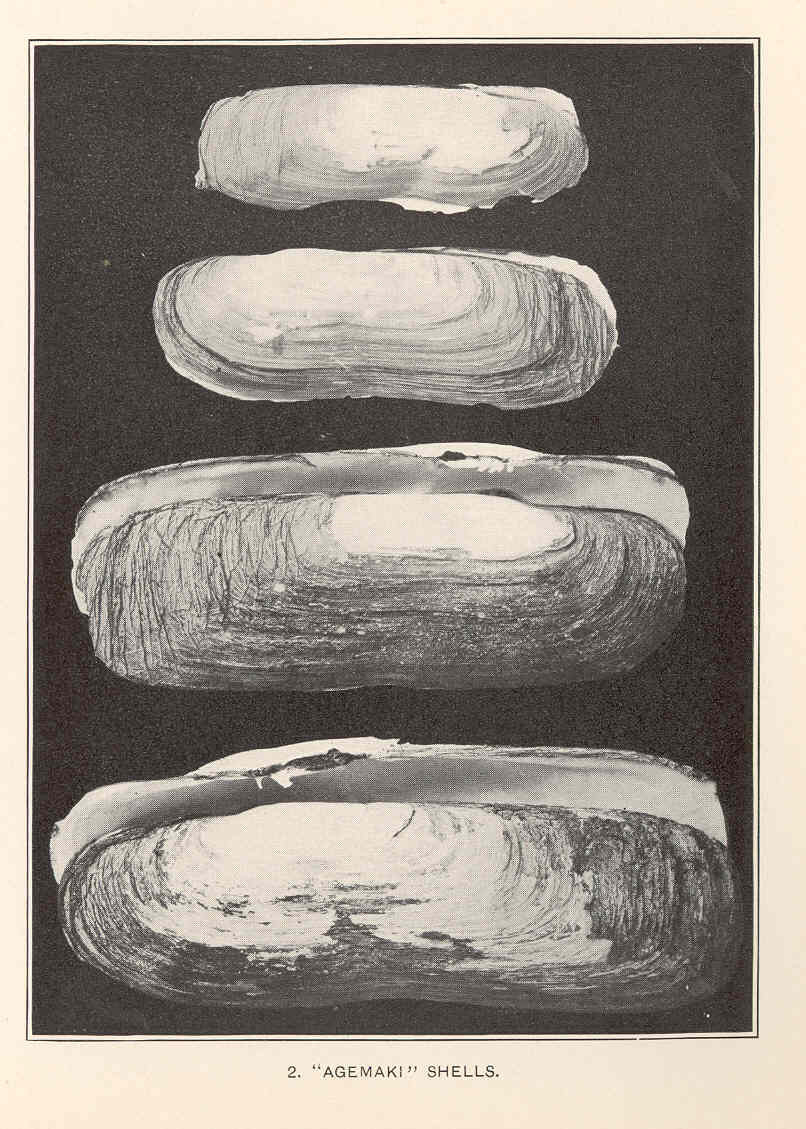

Scientific classification
- Domain: Eukaryota
- Kingdom: Animalia
- Phylum: Mollusca
- Class: Bivalvia
- Order: Adapedonta
- Family: Pharidae
- Genus: Sinonovacula; Prashad, 1924

= Sinonovacula =

Genus of bivalves

Sinonovacula is a genus of bivalves.

Species include:

- Sinonovacula constricta (Lamarck, 1818)
- Sinonovacula mollis (G. B. Sowerby II, 1874)
