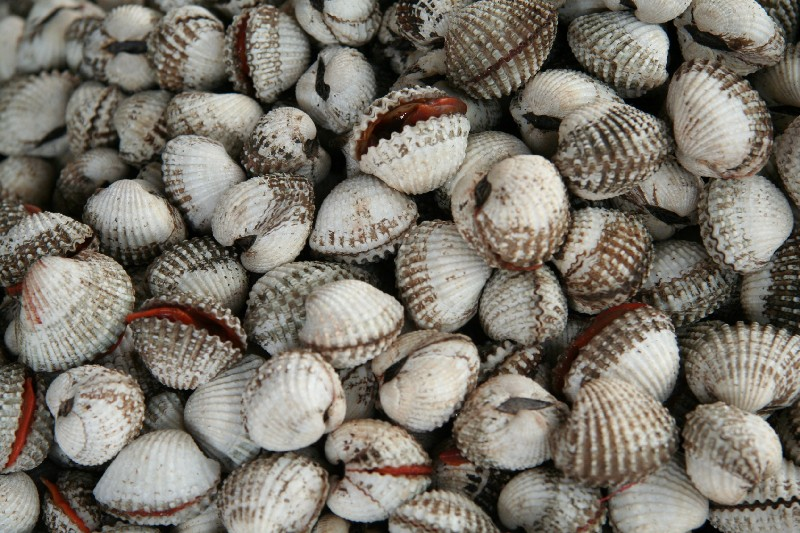
- Tegillarca granosa, commonly referred to as the "blood cockle"

Scientific classification
- Kingdom: Animalia
- Phylum: Mollusca
- Class: Bivalvia
- Order: Arcida
- Superfamily: Arcoidea
- Family: Arcidae
- Genus: Tegillarca; Iredale 1939

Synonyms
- Anadara (Tegillarca) Iredale, 1939; Anomalocardia Mörch, 1853 (Invalid: junior homonym of Anomalocardia Schumacher, 1817)

= Tegillarca =

Genus of bivalves

Tegillarca is a genus of molluscs of the family Arcidae, the Ark clams.

== Species ==
Species of this genus include:

- Tegillarca addita (Iredale, 1939)
- Tegillarca aequilatera (Dunker, 1868)
- Tegillarca bicors (Jonas in Philippi, 1845)
- Tegillarca disessa (Iredale, 1939)
- Tegillarca granosa (Linnaeus, 1758)
- Tegillarca nodifera (E. von Martens, 1860)
- Tegillarca rhombea (Born, 1778)
- Tegillarca zanzibarensis (Nyst, 1848)
