= Quanzhou Normal University =

Public university in Quanzhou, China

Coordinates: 24.865656°N 118.667428°E

- 泉州师范学院 (Chinese)
- Former names: Quanzhou Normal College
- Motto: 善学如泉 正心至大
- Motto in English: Perfect education in Quanzhou with strong mind and heart.
- Type: Public
- Established: 1958
- President: Huang Zijie
- Location: Quanzhou, Fujian, China
- Campus: Urban 1200 Mu
- Colours
- Website: www.qztc.edu.cn

Chinese name
- Simplified Chinese: 泉州师范学院
- Traditional Chinese: 泉州師範學院
Transcriptions
Standard Mandarin
- Hanyu Pinyin: Quánzhōu Shīfàn Xuéyuàn
Southern Min
- Hokkien POJ: Chôan-chiu-su-hōan-tāi-ha̍k

Quanzhou Normal University (Chinese: 泉州师范学院) is a public university located in Quanzhou, Fujian province, People's Republic of China.

== History ==
The university was established in 1958. It was formerly known as Quanzhou Normal College.

== Location ==
Quanzhou Normal University has four campuses. They are Chongfu Campus, Jiangnan Campus, Donghai Campus, and Shishan Campus. Chongfu Campus is at the base of southern Qingyuan Mountain. Jiangnan Campus is located in the Licheng District. Donghai Campus is situated at the crossing of Jinjiang River and Luoyangjiang River. Shishan Campus is near the famous Gaogai Mountain towards the south and Pengfeng to the north. It is in Nan'an City.

Quanzhou Normal University has a total enrollment of over 10,000 students and offers almost 100 programs of study in nine schools. The total university staff is over 1,000, with a teaching team of 600, including 180 professors and associate professors. The school occupies a space of 1300 mu (over 86 hectares). The library contains more than one million books and reference materials and 800,000 specialised books.

== University structure ==
This is the structure of the schools and departments at Quanzhou Normal University.

Schools	Departments
School of Software	Department of Software Engineering; Department of Animation
School of Humanities	Chinese Department; Department of Law and Political Science; Department of History and Sociology; Department of Journalism; Marxism and Leninism Teaching Section
School of Science	Department of Mathematics; Department of Physics; Department of Computer Science; Department of Information and Economic Mathematics; Department of General Science
School of Resources and Environmental Sciences	Department of Chemistry; Department of Geography; Department of Biology
School of Foreign Languages	Department of English; Department of College English; Department of International English
School of Business and Information Technology	Department of Economics; Department of Management; Department of E-Commerce
School of Arts	Department of Music; Department of Fine Arts; Department of Nanyin; General Arts Teaching
School of Educational Science	Department of Elementary Education and Special Education; Department of Modern Education Technology; Pre-school Education Department; Section of Curriculum and Teaching Methodology; Teaching Section of pedagogy and Psychology
School of Advanced Professional Education	Teaching Section of Arts; Teaching Section of Science
School of Further Education	Carder training Centre; Teachers' Training Centre; Adult Education Centre
Physical Education and Teaching	Physical Education Teaching Section
