= Zhang Guangjun (politician) =

Chinese engineer and politician

- 张广军

Vice Minister of Science and Technology
- Incumbent
- Assumed office November 2021
- Minister: Wang Zhigang

President of Southeast University
- In office November 2015 – January 2022
- Preceded by: Yi Hong
- Succeeded by: Huang Ru

Personal details
- Born: 21 March 1965 (age 61) Tianjin, China
- Party: Chinese Communist Party
- Education: Tianjin University
- Scientific career
- Fields: Precision instrument
- Workplaces: Beihang University (1991–2015); Southeast University (2015–2022); Ministry of Science and Technology (2021–present)

Chinese name
- Simplified Chinese: 张广军
- Traditional Chinese: 張廣軍
Transcriptions
Standard Mandarin
- Hanyu Pinyin: Zhāng Guǎngjūn

Zhang Guangjun (Chinese: 张广军; born 21 March 1965) is a Chinese engineer and politician who is the current Vice Minister of Science and Technology, in office since November 2021. Previously he served as president of Southeast University. He is an alternate of the 19th Central Committee of the Chinese Communist Party.

== Biography ==
Zhang was born in Tianjin, on 21 March 1965. He earned a bachelor's degree in 1986, a master's degree in 1989, and a doctor's degree in 1991, all in precision instrument and all from Tianjin University. He also studied at North Dakota State University from April 1997 to April 1998. He joined the Chinese Communist Party in June 1986.

After graduating from Tianjin University, he taught at Beihang University, where he successively worked as lecturer, associate professor, professor. He moved up the ranks to become vice-president and dean of the Graduate School in December 2008. He was honored as a Distinguished Young Scholar by the National Science Fund for Distinguished Young Scholars in 2001. He was appointed as a "Chang Jiang Scholar" (or " Yangtze River Scholar") by the Ministry of Education of the People's Republic of China in 2008. In November 2015, he became president of Southeast University, a position at vice-ministerial level. In November 2021, he was appointed Vice Minister of Science and Technology by the State Council of China.

Educational offices
Preceded by Yi Hong	President of Southeast University; 2015–2022	Succeeded by Huang Ru
