= Nan'an, Fujian =

Nan'an 南安市 Nanan
- County-level city
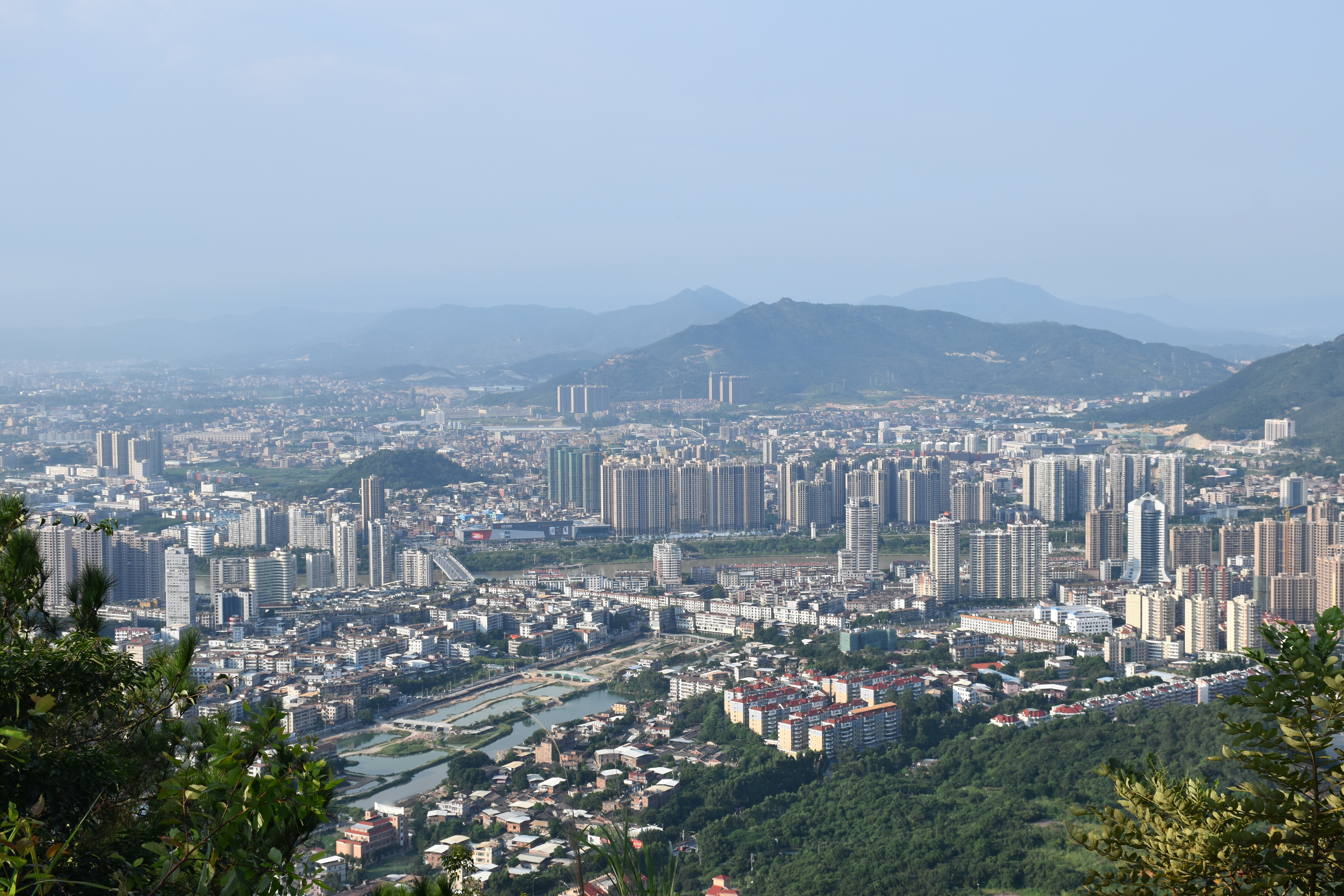
- Nan'an skyline

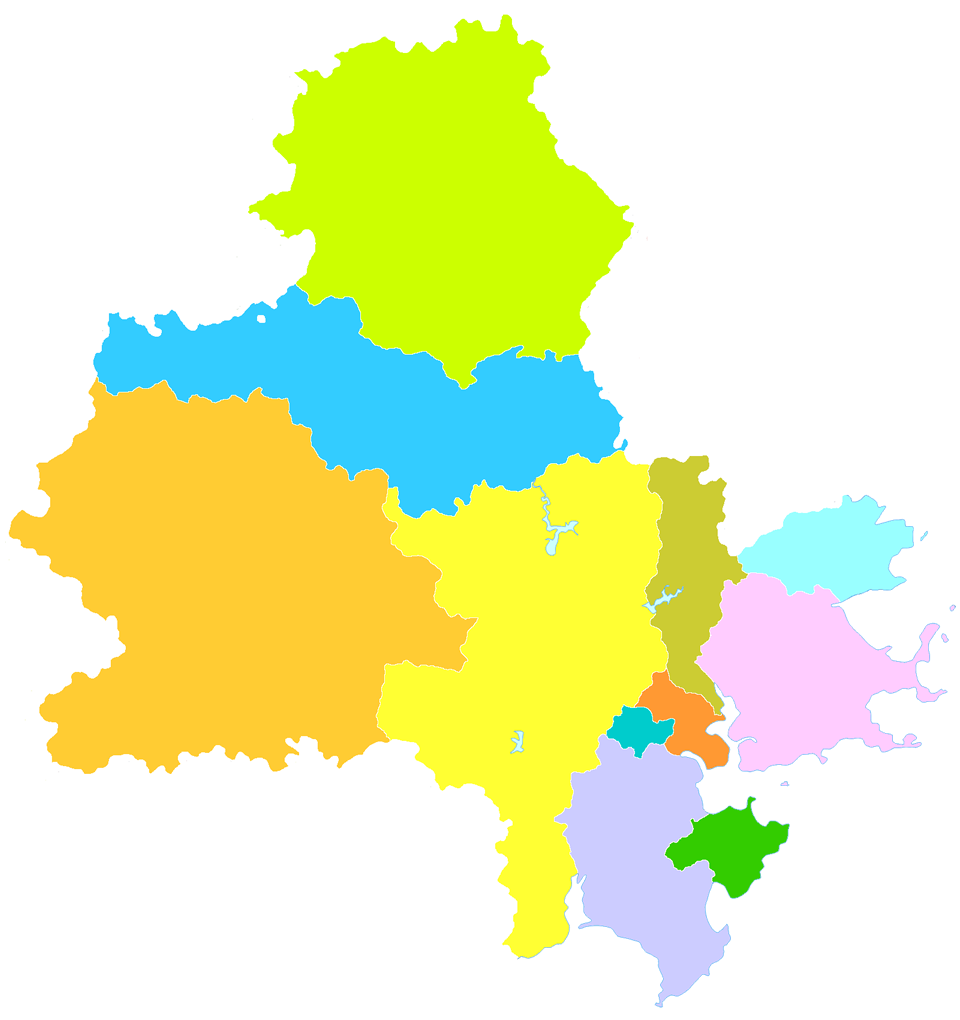
- Nan'an in Quanzhou

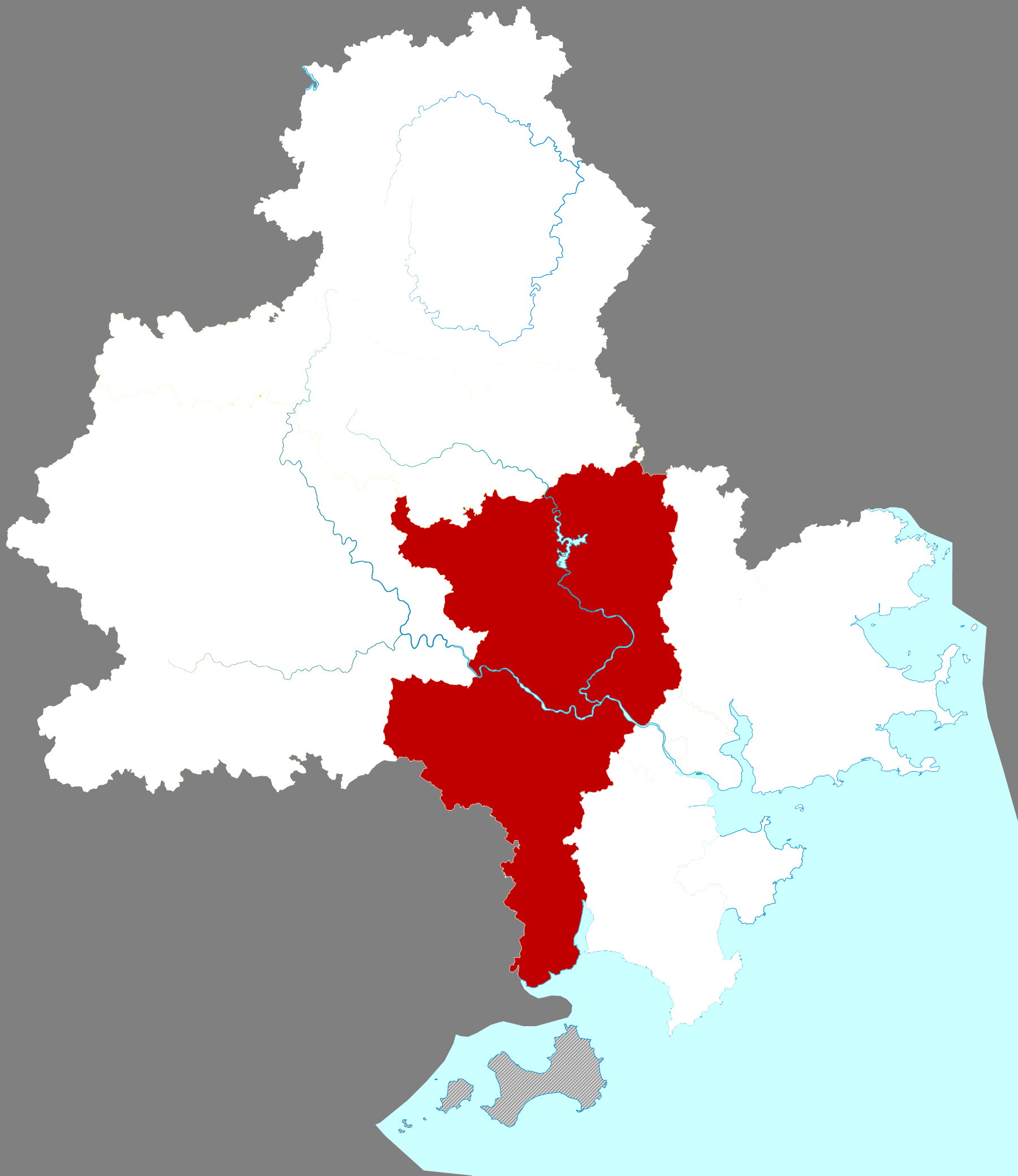
- Location in Quanzhou

- Location in Fujian
- Coordinates (Nan'an municipal government): 24°57′40″N 118°23′06″E
- Country: People's Republic of China
- Province: Fujian
- Prefecture-level city: Quanzhou

Government
  - CPC Secretary: Zhang Guisen
  - Mayor: Wang Lianzan

Area
  - Total: 2,036 km^{2} (786 sq mi)

Population (2023)
  - Total: 1,663,542
  - Density: 817.1/km^{2} (2,116/sq mi)
- Time zone: UTC+8 (China Standard)
- Postal code: 362300
- Area code: 0595

Nan'an (Chinese: 南安; Pe̍h-ōe-jī: Lâm-oaⁿ; Tâi-lô: Lâm-uann; lit. 'southern peace') is a county-level city of south Fujian Province, People's Republic of China. It is under the administration of Quanzhou and as of 2023, had a total population of 1,663,542. More than 4,000,000 overseas Chinese trace their ancestry to Nan'an.

== History ==
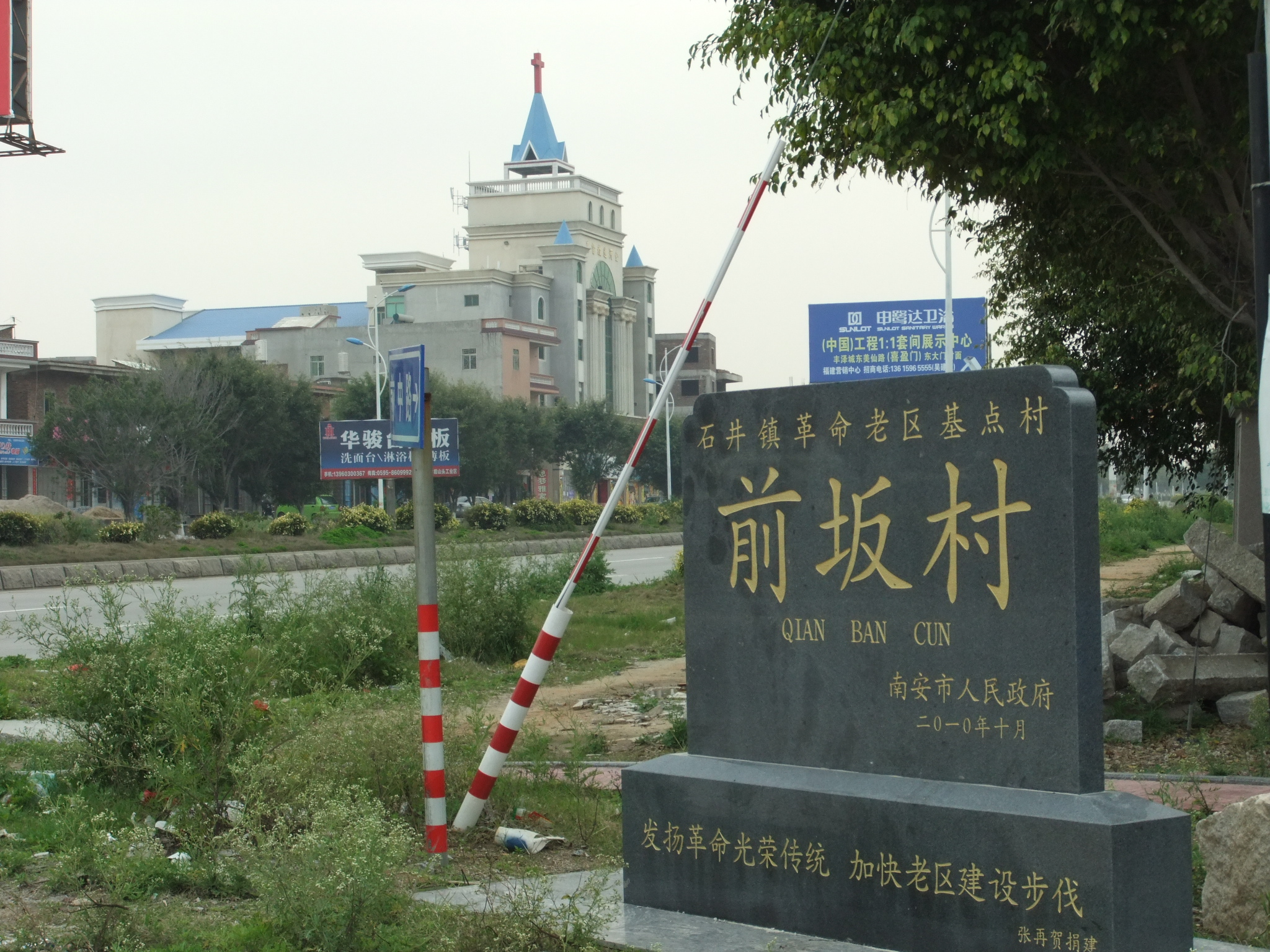
Lianhe Church in Qianban Village, Shijing Town, Nan'an

Inhabited since the Neolithic Era, the first incarnation of Nan'an was established as a commandery in the early 500s by the division of Jin'an County under Emperor Wu of Liang. It was under the jurisdiction of the Qingyuan Circuit during the Min Kingdom and was incorporated into Quan Prefecture (泉州府) during the Ming dynasty, when it was considered one of the Three Wu Kingdoms alongside Jinjiang and Hui'an.

Following the establishment of the Republic of China, Nan'an was a part of Jinjiang Prefecture until its incorporation into Quanzhou City in 1986; it was the site of military engagements during the Chinese Communist Revolution. Nan'an was established as a county-level city in its own right in 1993.

== Geography and climate ==
Nan'an experiences subtropical monsoonal humid climate. It has an average temperature of 20.9 °C (69.6 °F).

The city covers an area of 2,036 square kilometres (786 sq mi).

Nan'an is situated below Anxi County, adjacent to Jinjiang City to the east and Tong'an District of Xiamen to the West. Nan'an is 97 kilometres (60 mi) from Xiamen. It is 30 kilometres (19 mi) from downtown of Quanzhou and 220 kilometres (140 mi) from the provincial capital, Fuzhou.

Islands and islets in Nan'an include:

- Kui Yu (奎屿) 24°35′N 118°25′E
- Dabai Yu (大佰屿 or 大百屿, traditional characters: 大百嶼) 24°34′N 118°27′E
- Xiaobai Yu (小佰屿 or 小百屿) 24°34′N 118°26′E

Climate data for Nan'an, elevation 45 m (148 ft), (1991–2020 normals, extremes 1981–2022)
Month	Jan	Feb	Mar	Apr	May	Jun	Jul	Aug	Sep	Oct	Nov	Dec	Year
Record high °C (°F)	28.6 (83.5)	30.8 (87.4)	32.8 (91.0)	34.3 (93.7)	35.9 (96.6)	36.9 (98.4)	39.6 (103.3)	39.0 (102.2)	37.5 (99.5)	35.0 (95.0)	32.5 (90.5)	29.2 (84.6)	39.6 (103.3)
Mean daily maximum °C (°F)	18.0 (64.4)	18.7 (65.7)	20.9 (69.6)	25.3 (77.5)	28.6 (83.5)	31.4 (88.5)	34.1 (93.4)	33.7 (92.7)	32.0 (89.6)	28.5 (83.3)	24.7 (76.5)	20.2 (68.4)	26.3 (79.4)
Daily mean °C (°F)	13.2 (55.8)	13.9 (57.0)	16.2 (61.2)	20.6 (69.1)	24.2 (75.6)	27.3 (81.1)	29.4 (84.9)	28.9 (84.0)	27.4 (81.3)	23.8 (74.8)	20.0 (68.0)	15.3 (59.5)	21.7 (71.0)
Mean daily minimum °C (°F)	10.1 (50.2)	10.8 (51.4)	13.0 (55.4)	17.3 (63.1)	21.0 (69.8)	24.3 (75.7)	25.8 (78.4)	25.7 (78.3)	24.1 (75.4)	20.4 (68.7)	16.6 (61.9)	12.0 (53.6)	18.4 (65.2)
Record low °C (°F)	1.3 (34.3)	3.3 (37.9)	2.6 (36.7)	10.1 (50.2)	12.2 (54.0)	16.2 (61.2)	22.9 (73.2)	22.4 (72.3)	16.3 (61.3)	13.1 (55.6)	6.3 (43.3)	−1.0 (30.2)	−1.0 (30.2)
Average precipitation mm (inches)	45.7 (1.80)	79.3 (3.12)	108.8 (4.28)	121.8 (4.80)	205.4 (8.09)	286.1 (11.26)	182.4 (7.18)	246.4 (9.70)	156.6 (6.17)	64.0 (2.52)	45.6 (1.80)	47.0 (1.85)	1,589.1 (62.57)
Average precipitation days (≥ 0.1 mm)	8.0	11.0	14.0	13.9	15.9	17.2	11.0	14.2	9.7	4.8	5.4	6.7	131.8
Average relative humidity (%)	71	74	75	75	77	79	74	75	72	66	68	68	73
Mean monthly sunshine hours	124.7	103.2	107.9	125.1	136.0	158.1	243.2	207.8	180.6	181.8	145.6	142.9	1,856.9
Percentage possible sunshine	37	32	29	33	33	39	58	52	49	51	45	44	42
Source: China Meteorological Administrationall-time May Record

== Administrative divisions ==
The city is divided into 3 subdistricts, 21 towns, and 2 townships. The city also contains an economic development zone.

=== Subdistricts ===
- Ximei Subdistrict, Liucheng Subdistrict, and Meilin Subdistrict.

=== Towns ===
- Guanqiao (官桥镇), Shengxin (省新镇), Luncang (仑苍镇), Dongtian (东田镇), Yingdu (英都镇), Xiangyun, Jintao (金淘镇), Shishan (诗山镇), Penghua (蓬华镇), Matou (码头镇), Jiudu (九都镇), Lefeng (乐峰镇), Luodong (罗东镇), Meishan (梅山镇), Honglai (洪濑镇), Hongmei (洪梅镇), Kangmei (康美镇), Fengzhou (丰州镇), Xiamei (霞美镇), Shuitou, and Shijing.

=== Townships ===
- Meishan Township and Xiangyang Township.

== Economy ==
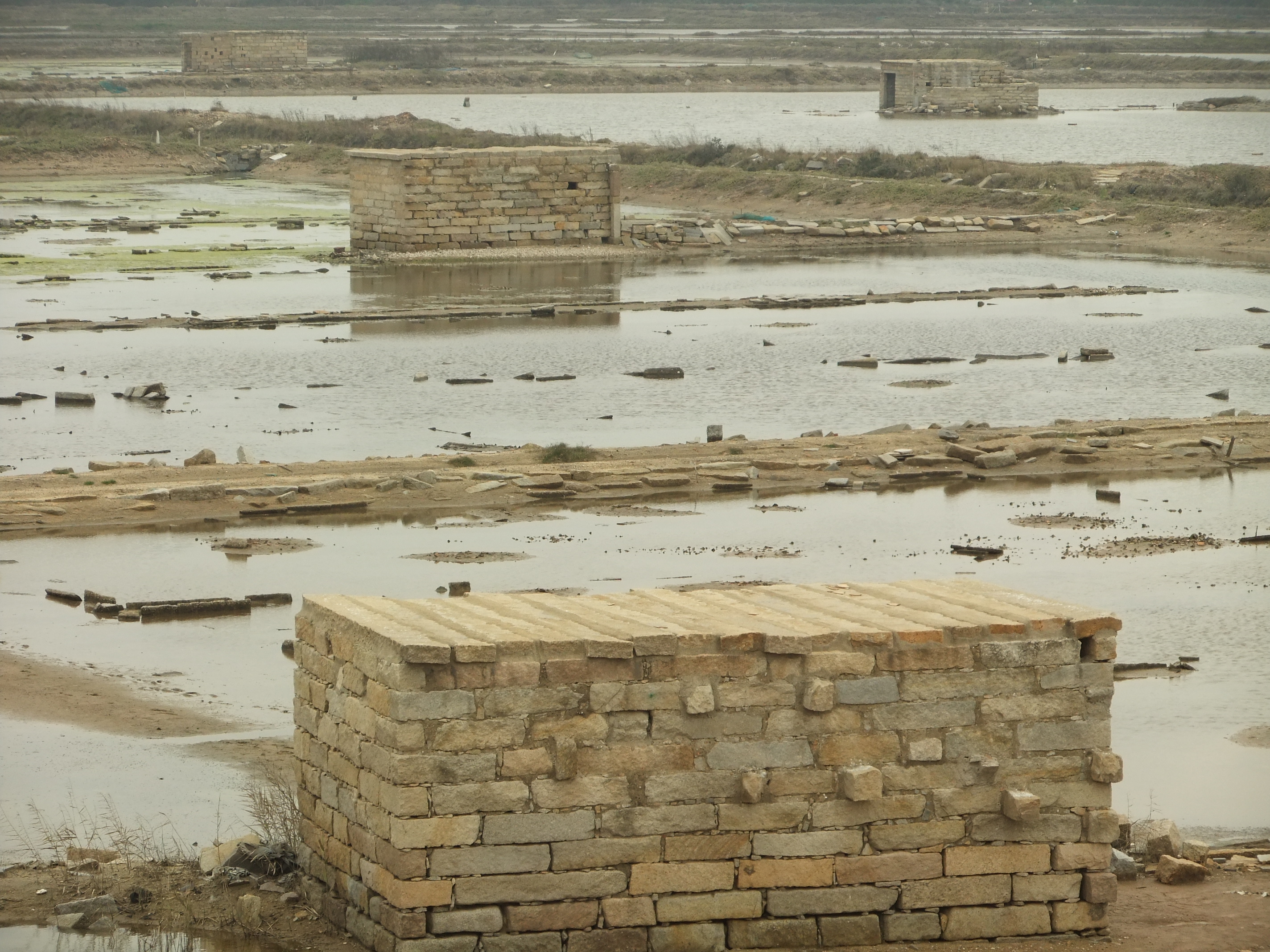
An aquaculture establishment in Anhai Bay, near Shijing Town. Note the use of the local stone for construction.

Nan'an is fast developing into an economic and industrial hub for Quanzhou prefecture. Its close proximity to regional economic centres such as Xiamen, Guangzhou, Fuzhou, Shanghai, Guangzhou and Shenzhen makes it an important investment location for foreign investments and Taiwan businessmen.

Nan'an has very strong rail infrastructure and road links making it a gateway for tourism as well as commerce.

== Culture ==
Nan'an is closely connected to the history of overseas Chinese, having been a hub of the Maritime Silk Road and a longtime economic and cultural centre for the Minnan people, with over 4 million overseas Chinese tracing their ancestry to the area Nanguan music has its origins in the area in and surrounding Nan'an. It is known as the location of numerous Taoist grand temples and Anping Bridge, a stone beam bridge and as well as the burial place of general Ming dynasty King Koxinga

The local language of Nan'an is a variety of Hokkien, part of the Quanzhou family of Hokkien dialects.

== Education ==
The Shishan campus of Quanzhou Normal University is located in Nan'an. Schools located in Nan'an include Nan'an Experimental Middle School.

== Notable people ==
=== Native to Nan'an ===
- Guang Ze Zun Wang, deity in Chinese folk religion
- Huang Dongping, professional badminton player and Olympic gold medalist
- Lee Kong Chian, billionaire, politician and businessman
- Lim Bo Seng, resistance fighter and national hero of Singapore
- Koxinga, king and general
- Li Fabin, three-time weightlifting World Champion and Olympic gold medalist

=== Ancestral home ===
- Huang Ru, Chinese engineer and academic
- Ong Beng Seng, Malaysian billionaire
- Wang Wenjiao, Indonesian-born badminton player known as the "Godfather of Chinese Badminton"
- Ye Fei, Philippine-born People's Liberation Army general and politician
