= Anhai =

Town in Fujian, China

Anhai 安海镇
- Town
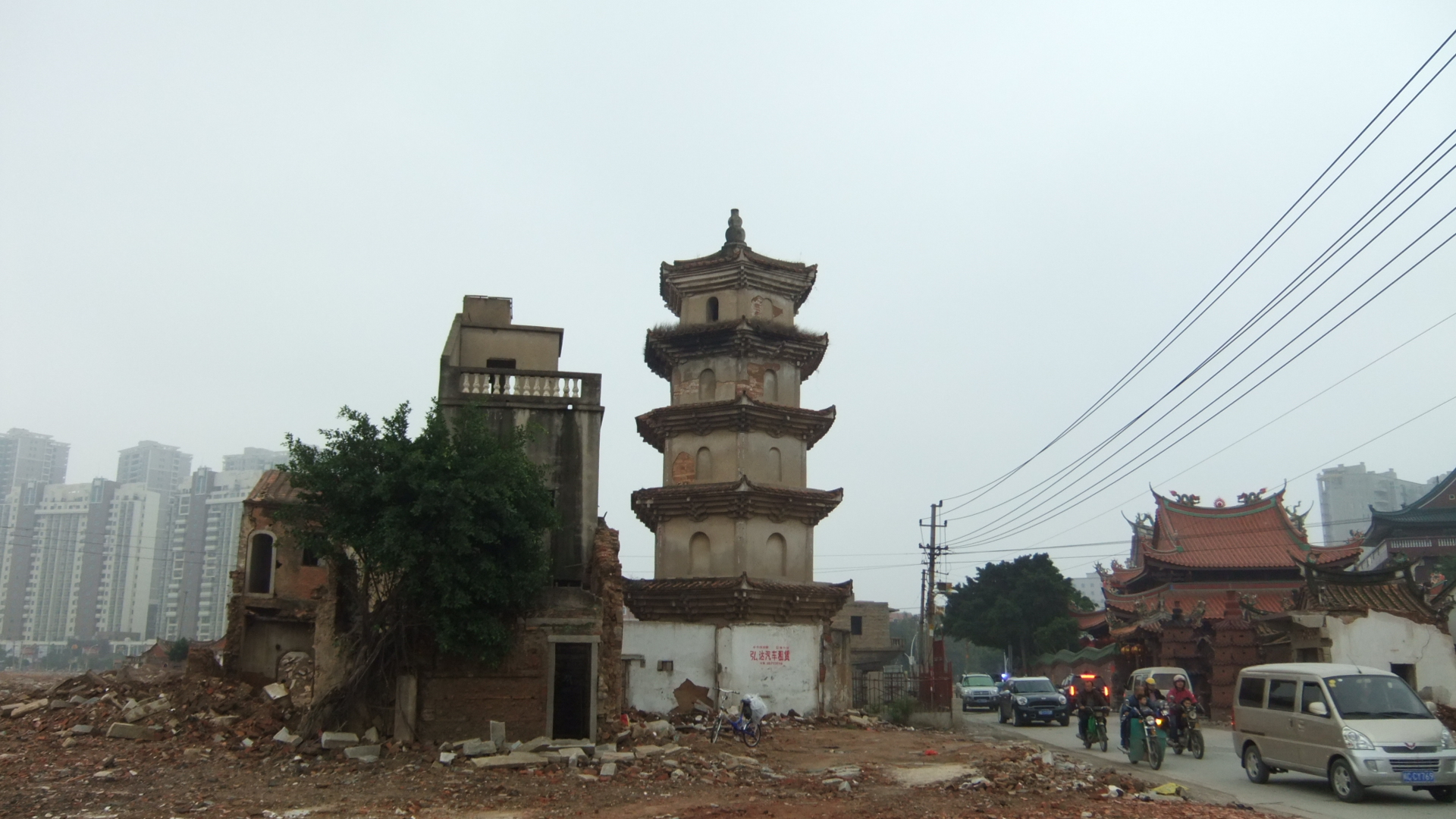
- Surviving White Pagoda (center) of Shuixin Chan Temple (right), with the adjacent old residential neighborhood (left) demolished, to make way for new development (such as seen in the background)

- Location in Fujian Anhai (China)
- Coordinates (Anhai town government): 24°43′00″N 118°28′34″E
- Country: People's Republic of China
- Province: Fujian
- Prefecture-level city: Quanzhou
- County-level city: Jinjiang
- Time zone: UTC+8 (China Standard)
- Postal code: 362261

Anhai
- Chinese: 安海
Transcriptions
Standard Mandarin
- Hanyu Pinyin: Ānhǎi
- Wade–Giles: An^{1}-hai^{3}
- IPA: [án.xàɪ]
Yue: Cantonese
- Jyutping: on1 hoi2
- IPA: [ɔn˥.hɔj˧˥]
Southern Min
- Hokkien POJ: Oaⁿ-hái

Anhai (Note: Formerly romanized as Ganhai, Gan-hai, Nganhai.) is a town in southern Fujian province or Minnan, People's Republic of China. It is located in the far southern suburbs of the Quanzhou metropolitan area and is separated by Weitou Bay (simplified Chinese: 围头湾; traditional Chinese: 圍頭灣; Pe̍h-ōe-jī: Ûi-thâu-oân) from Kinmen, which is controlled by the Republic of China on Taiwan. Administratively, Anhai is part of Jinjiang County-level City, which in its turn is subordinated to Quanzhou.

The highest point in the town's administrative area is Mount Língyuán (simplified Chinese: 灵源山; traditional Chinese: 靈源山; Pe̍h-ōe-jī: Lêng-goân-soaⁿ) at 305 metres (1,001 ft).

== History ==
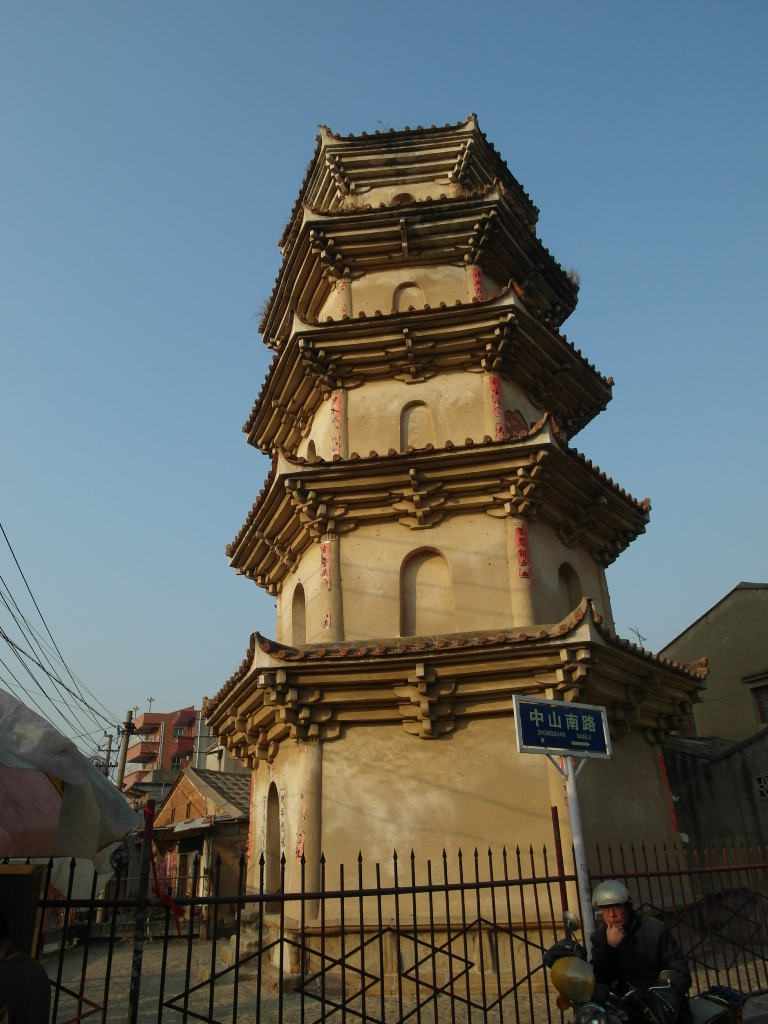
The White Pagoda

Anhai was known as Anping (Chinese: 安平; Pe̍h-ōe-jī: An-pêng) during the Song dynasty. The famous Song-era Anping Bridge crosses a tidal estuary to the west of town, connecting Anhai with its western neighbor, the town of Shuitou, which administratively belongs in Nan'an. Shuixin Chan Temple is located by the eastern end of the bridge.

Anhai was an important port during the Ming and early Qing periods. The 19th-century researchers writing for the Hakluyt Society thought Anhai was the port of "Tansuso" visited by Martín de Rada, but later research identified Tansuso as Zhongzuosuo (Chinese: 中左所; Pe̍h-ōe-jī: Tiong-chó-só͘), which is in modern Xiamen, some 40 km (25 mi) to the west. Anhai regained importance in the later 19th century when sand bars created by the Jin and Luo rivers blocked the principal harbor for Quanzhou; the city retained its size and importance to local trade but maritime commerce was redirected to Anhai.
