= Shijing, Fujian =

Shijing 石井镇 Shih-ching
- Town
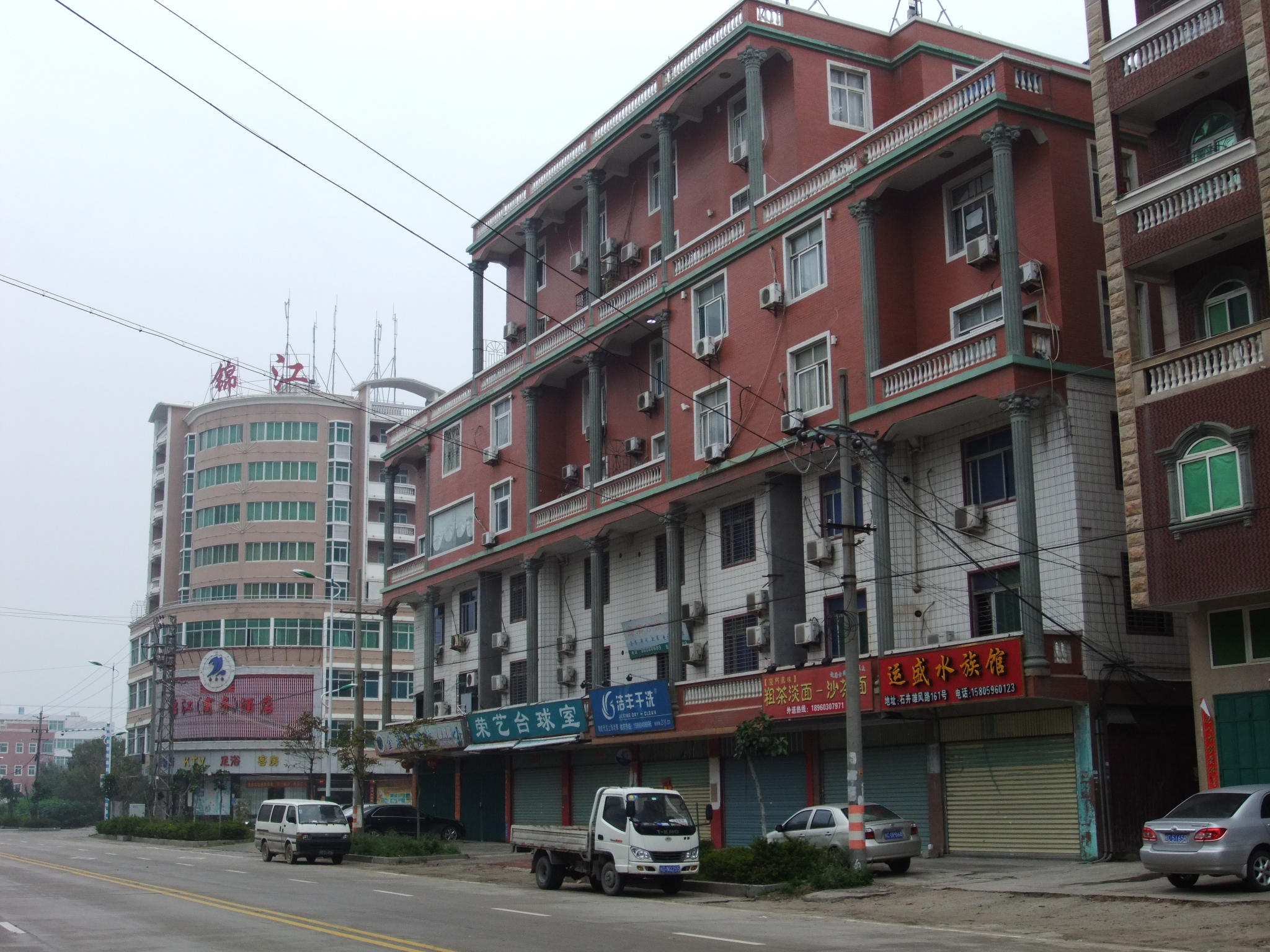

- Location in Fujian Shijing (China)
- Coordinates: 24°37′39″N 118°26′08″E
- Country: People's Republic of China
- Province: Fujian
- Prefecture-level city: Quanzhou
- County-level city: Nan'an

Area
  - Total: 85.37 km^{2} (32.96 sq mi)

Population (2010)
  - Total: 92,806
  - Density: 1,087/km^{2} (2,816/sq mi)
- Time zone: UTC+8 (China Standard)

Shijing Town (Chinese: 石井; pinyin: Shíjǐng; Pe̍h-ōe-jī: Chio̍h-chéⁿ) is a township-level division of Nan'an City, in southern Fujian Province, China.

== Geography ==
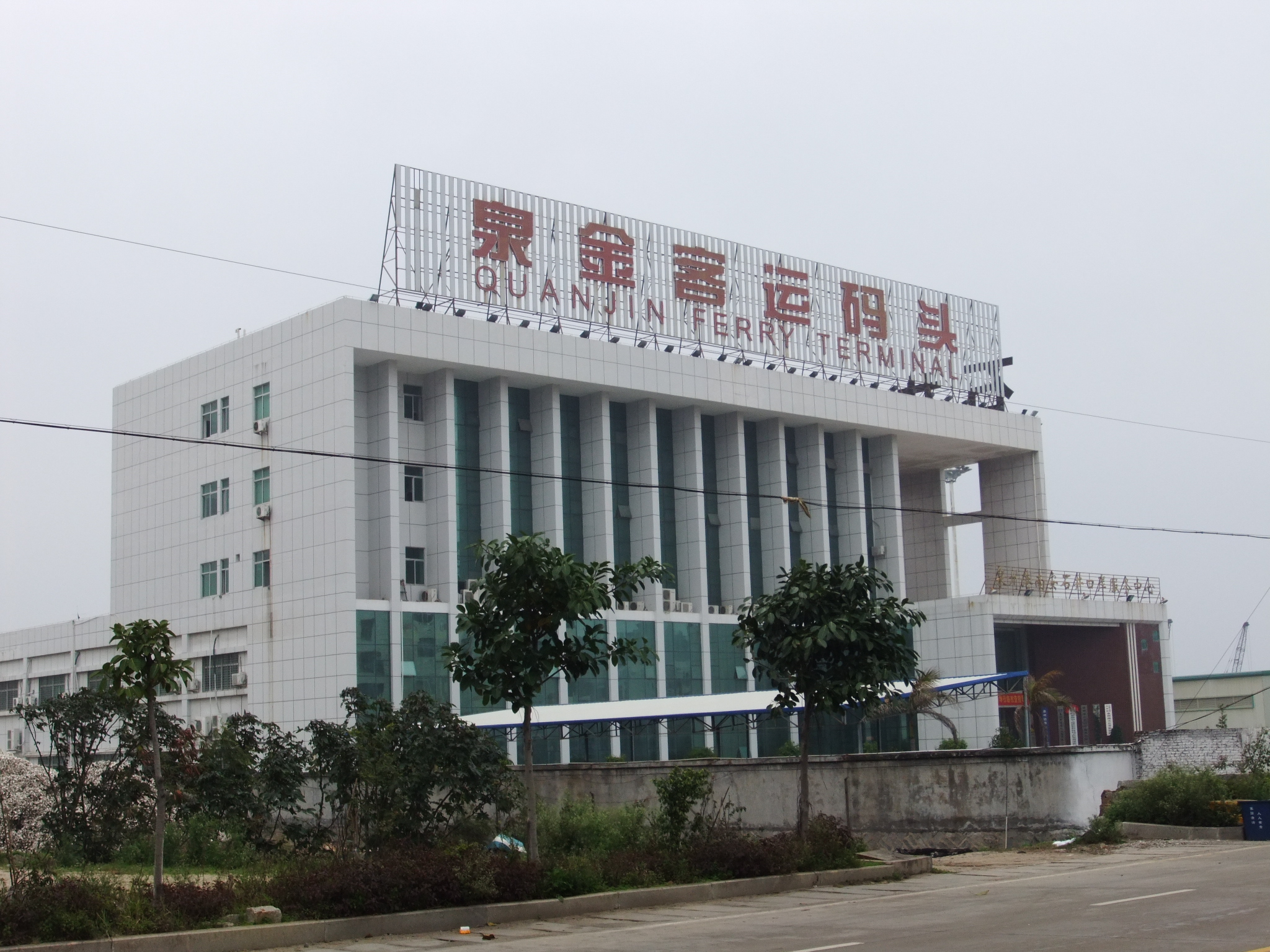
Quanzhou-Kinmen Ferry Terminal in Shijing

Shijing Town is located on the western shore of the narrow Anhai Bay (the estuary of the Shijing River), where it opens into the Weitou Bay (围头湾) of the Taiwan Strait.

Administratively, the territory included into Shijing Town forms sort of a southern "panhandle" of Nan'an City, and the only part of Nan'an that is located on the sea coast.

Shijing is served by Fujian Provincial Highway 201 (S201), which runs generally parallel to the sea coast.

== Administrative divisions ==
One residential community:

- Shijing (Shih-ching; 石井社区)

Twenty-five villages:

- Sunei (苏内村), Xiafang (下房村), Lianfeng (联丰村), Yuanxia (Yüan-hsia; 院下村), Cujin (促进村), Houdian (Hou-tien; 后店村), Sanxiang (三乡村), Linbing (林柄村), Yingqian (营前村), Tiandong (田东村), Xianjing (仙景村), Laogang (老港村), Qiaotou (桥头村), Hemei (和美村), Kuixia (奎霞村), Xiban (昔坂村), Gushan (Ku-shan; 古山村), Guoqian (Kuo-ch'ien; 郭前村), Yangshan (杨山村), Yuanqian (Yüan-ch'ien; 院前村), Cendou / Yindou (岑兜村 / 吟兜村), Xidong (Ch'i-tung; 溪东村), Jujiang (菊江村 / 淗江村), Qianban (前坂村), Xifu (西福村)

== Economy ==
As the name (Shijing 石井 = "Stone Well") indicates, Shijing, along with the nearby Shuitou, is a major center of stoneworking.

Shijing is also a sea port of regional importance (administratively, one of the port areas of the Port of Quanzhou), involved in the cross-strait trade with Taiwan. Shijing also has the mainland terminal of the so-called "Quan-Jin Ferry" (short for "Quanzhou-Kinmen Ferry"), the regular passenger ferry service to the nearby Kinmen (Quemoy, Jinmen) Island, held by the Taiwan-based Republic of China. As of February 2012, this ferry (unlike similar ferries from Xiamen) may only be taken by the PRC and ROC citizens, and not by third-country nationals.

== See also ==
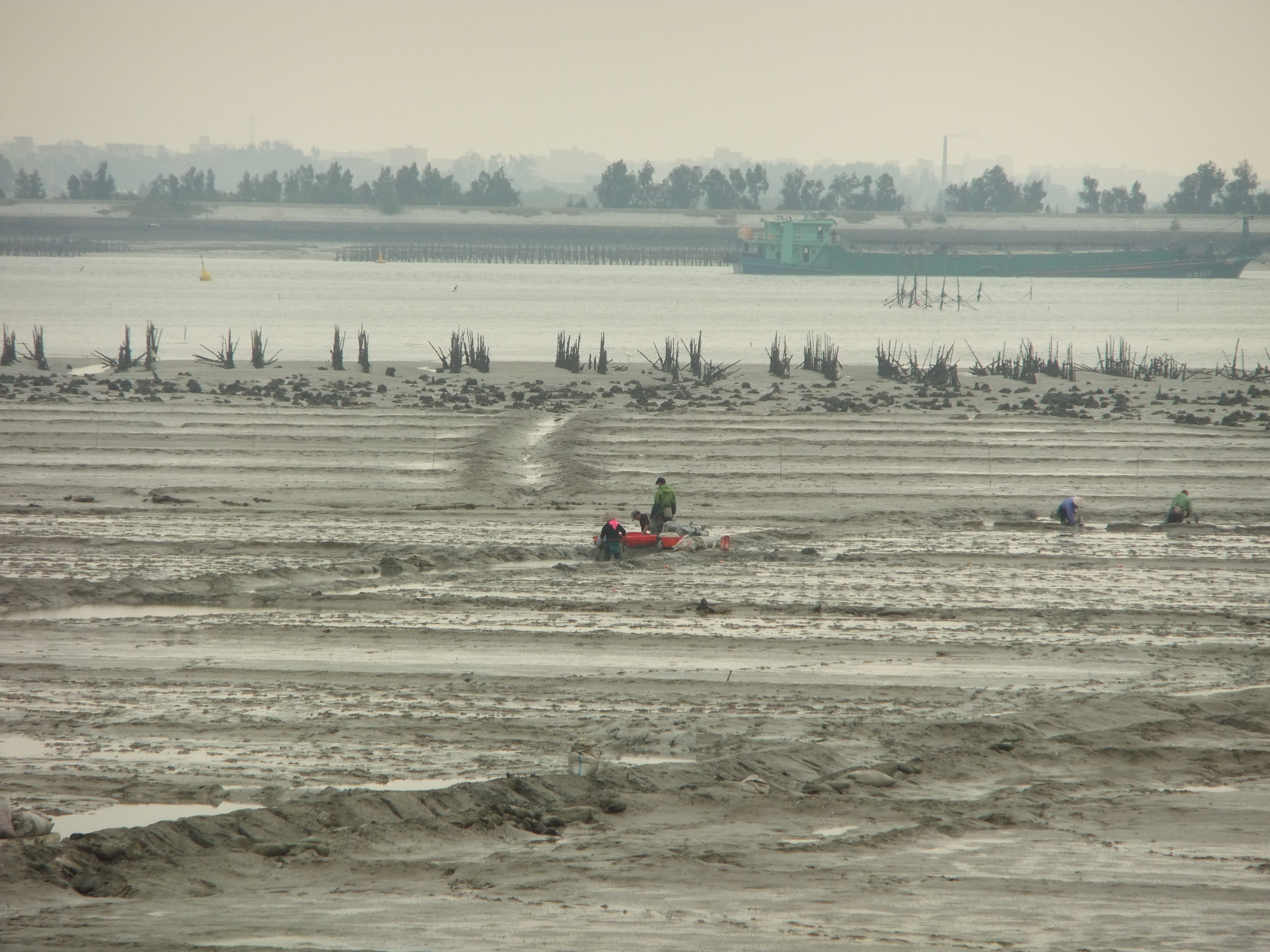
Tidal plains of Anhai Bay used for oyster (?) farming

- List of township-level divisions of Fujian
