= Huang Ru =

Chinese scientist

- 黄如

President of Southeast University
- In office 7 January 2022 – 14 January 2025
- Party Secretary: Zuo Wei
- Preceded by: Zhang Guangjun
- Succeeded by: Sun Youhong

Personal details
- Born: November 1969 (age 56) Nanjing, Jiangsu, China
- Party: Chinese Communist Party
- Education: Southeast University; Peking University
- Scientific career
- Fields: Microelectronic devices
- Workplaces: Southeast University (2022–2025); Peking University (1997–2022)

Chinese name
- Simplified Chinese: 黄如
- Traditional Chinese: 黃如
Transcriptions
Standard Mandarin
- Hanyu Pinyin: Huáng Rú

Huang Ru (simplified Chinese: 黄如; traditional Chinese: 黃如; pinyin: Huáng Rú; born November 1969) is a Chinese electronic engineer and scientist of Hui ethnicity who is currently a party member of the National Development and Reform Commission (NDRC). She also served as president of Southeast University, was a former vice president of Peking University, and an academician of the Chinese Academy of Sciences.

== Biography ==
Huang was born in Nanjing, Jiangsu, in November 1969, while her ancestral home in Nan'an, Quanzhou, Fujian. She secondary studied at Wuxi No. 1 High School and Nanjing Zhonghua High School (南京市中华中学). In 1987, she was accepted to Southeast University, where she earned her master's degree in electronic engineering in 1994. Then she attended Peking University where she obtained her doctor's degree in 1997.

After university, Huang stayed at Peking University and worked successively as associate professor, full professor, and doctoral supervisor. She was honored as a Distinguished Young Scholar by the National Science Fund for Distinguished Young Scholars in 2006. She was appointed as dean of the School of Electronic Engineering and Computer Science in 2014. She became dean of the School of Artificial Intelligence in April 2019, before becoming vice president in December of that same year.

On 7 January 2022, the Central Committee of the Chinese Communist Party and State Council of China appointed her as president of Southeast University, a position at vice-ministerial level. In October 2022, she was elected as an alternate of the 20th Central Committee of the Chinese Communist Party.

In January 2025, Huang was transferred to the National Development and Reform Commission as a party member, retaining her position at vice-ministerial level.

In February 2026, she was appointed as a vice-chairperson of the National Development and Reform Commission.

== Publications ==
- SOI CMOS技术及其应用 [SOI CMOS Technology and Its Application] (in Chinese). Beijing: Science Press. 1 October 2005. ISBN 9787030159687.

== Honours and awards ==
- 2010 State Technological Invention Award (Second Class) for new devices and technologies of nano scale silicon-based integrated circuits and their applications
- 2013 State Science and Technology Progress Award (Second Class) for process development and industrialization of 65-40 nm complete sets of VLSI products
- 7 December 2015 Member of the Chinese Academy of Sciences

Educational offices
Preceded by Zhang Guangjun	President of Southeast University; 2022–2025	Succeeded by Sun Youhong
