= Dongshi, Fujian =

Dongshi 东石镇
- Town
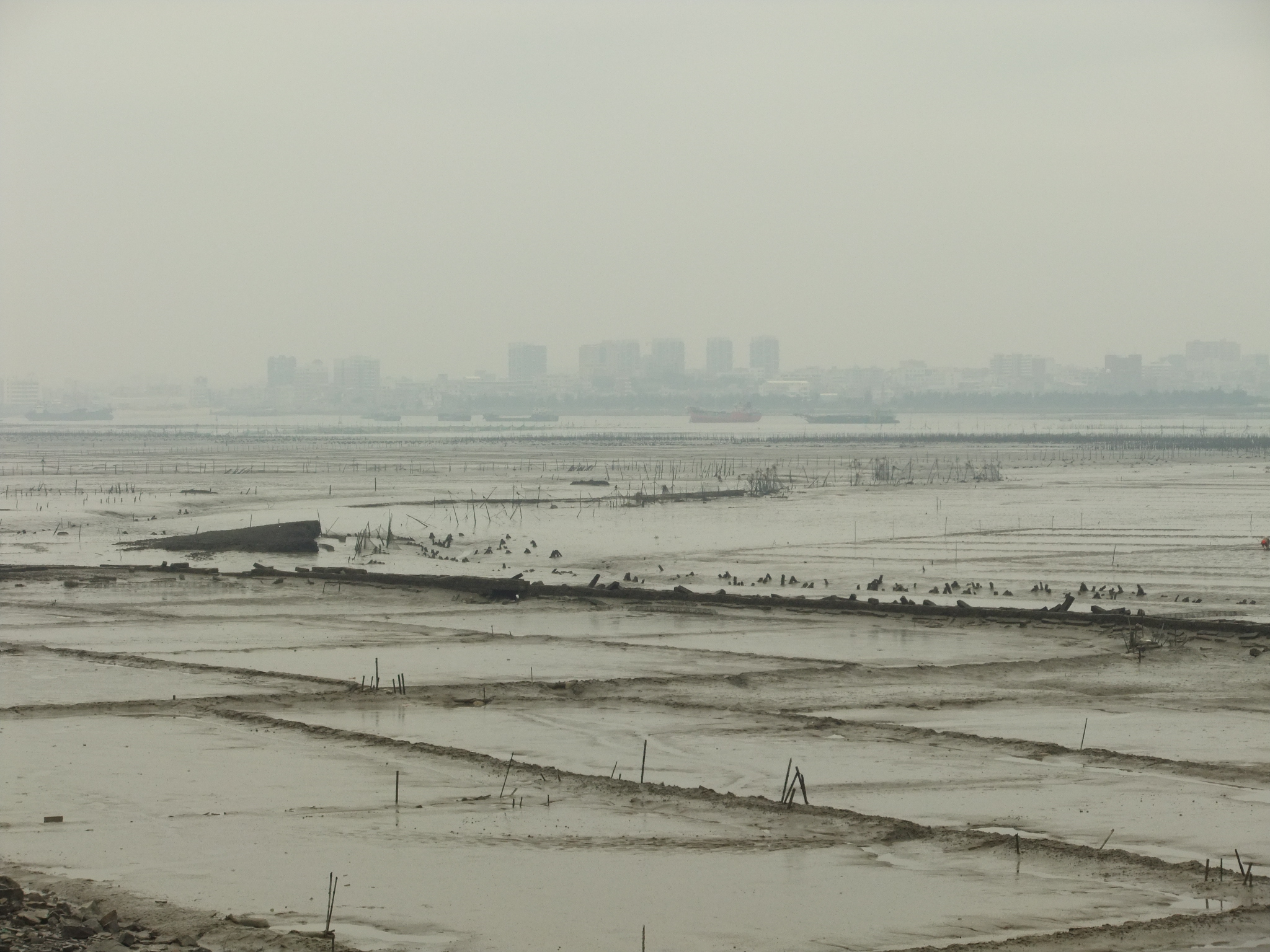
- Dongshi skyline seen from across the Anhai Bay

- Location in Fujian Dongshi (China)
- Coordinates: 24°40′0″N 118°28′0″E
- Country: People's Republic of China
- Province: Fujian
- Prefecture-level city: Quanzhou
- County-level city: Jinjiang
- Time zone: UTC+8 (China Standard)

Dongshi Town (China) (Chinese: 东石镇; Pe̍h-ōe-jī: Tang-chio̍h-tìn) is a township-level division of Jinjiang county-level city, which in its turn is a part of Quanzhou Prefecture-level city in Fujian Province, China.

Dongshi is located on the eastern side of the Anhai Bay, which is the estuary formed by the Shijing River as it flows into the Taiwan Strait.

== Literature ==
Dongshi is the hometown of the author Cai Chongda and the setting for many of his autobiographical essays.

== See also ==
- List of township-level divisions of Fujian
