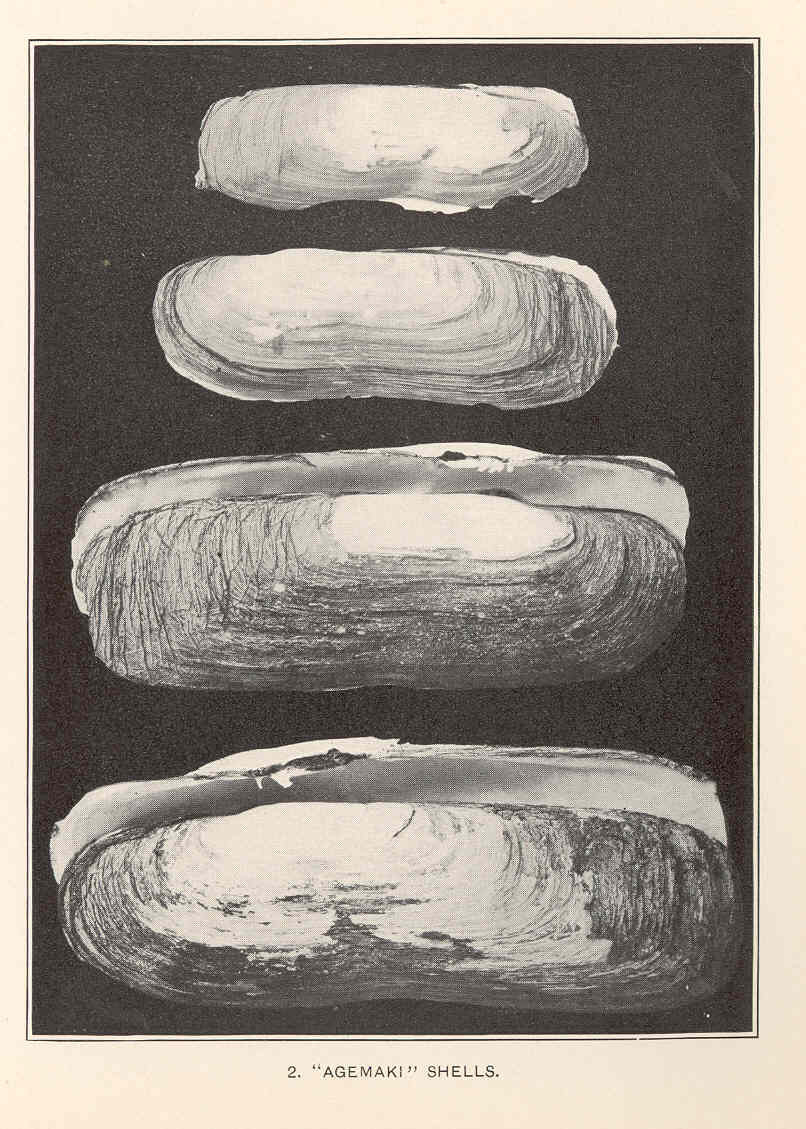

Scientific classification
- Kingdom: Animalia
- Phylum: Mollusca
- Class: Bivalvia
- Order: Adapedonta
- Family: Pharidae
- Genus: Sinonovacula
- Species: S. constricta

Binomial name
- Sinonovacula constricta (Lamarck, 1818)

= Sinonovacula constricta =

Species of bivalve

Global aquaculture production of Constricted tagelus (Sinonovacula constricta) in thousand tonnes from 1965 to 2022, as reported by the FAO

Sinonovacula constricta, the constricted tagelus, Chinese razor clam or Agemaki clam, is a commercially important species of bivalve native to the estuaries and mudflats of China, Korea, and Japan. It is extensively aquafarmed in China and other countries, with 742,084 tons worth US$667,876,000 harvested in 2008.

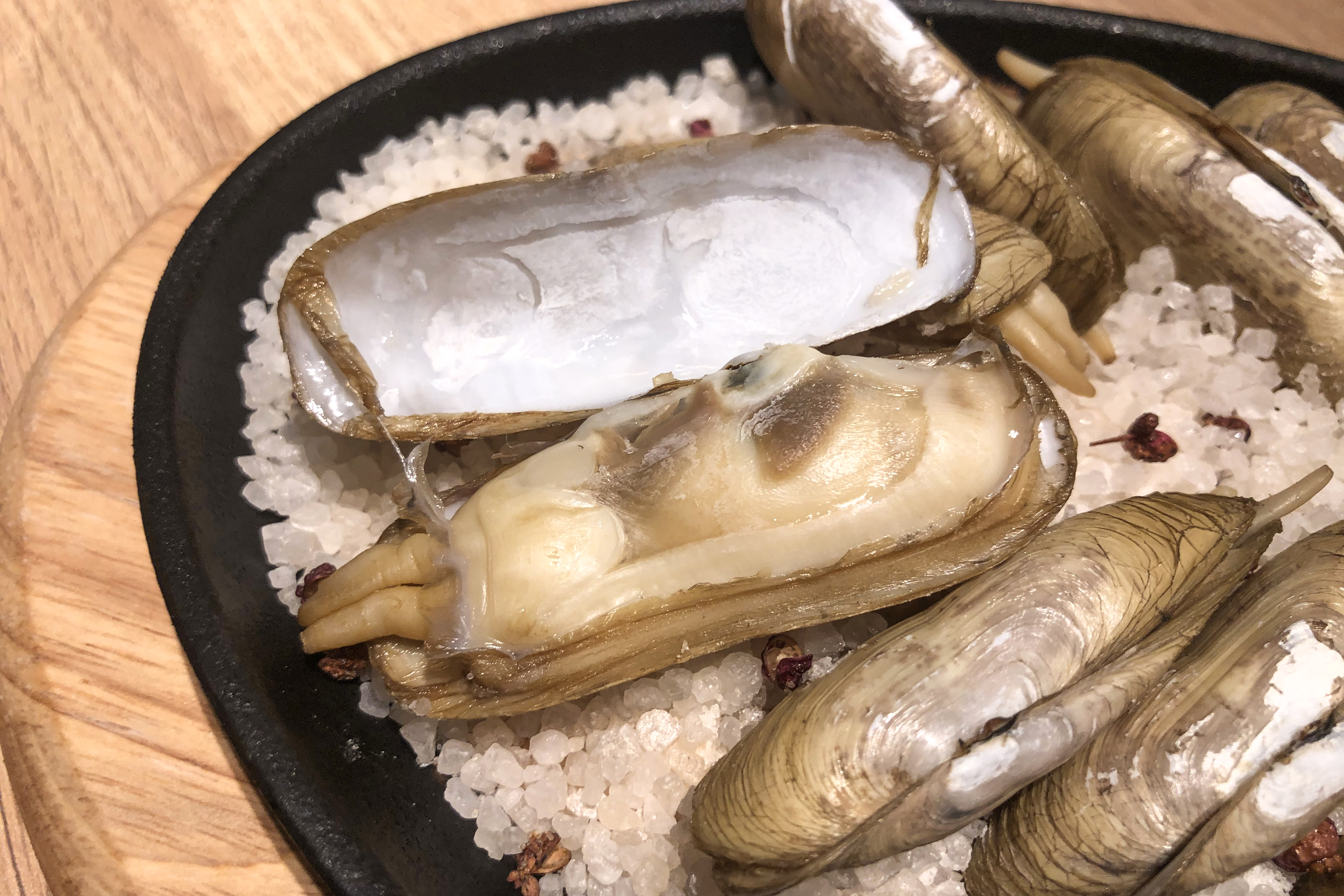
Salt-baked Duotou clams, a famous Putian dish

Clams from Duotou village in Putian city, Fujian are particularly famous, and are a key ingredient in Putian cuisine.
