= Gochu =

Gochu (고추) is Korean for chili pepper.

"Gochu" may also refer more specifically to:

- Korean chili pepper
- Cheongyang chili pepper
- Cucumber chili pepper
