= 中華料理 =

中華料理 may refer to:

- Chinese cuisine
- Japanese Chinese cuisine
- Korean Chinese cuisine
