= Jjamppong =

Korean spicy noodle dish

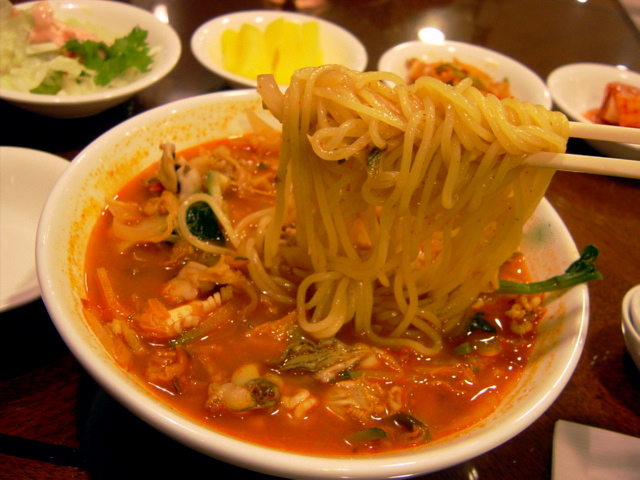
- Type: Guksu
- Course: Main course
- Place of origin: China (original); Korea (introduced) (Note: Chinese restaurants in Korea.)
- Region or state: East Asia
- Associated cuisine: Korean Chinese cuisine
- Serving temperature: Hot

Korean name
- Hangul: 짬뽕
- RR: jjamppong
- MR: tchamppong
- IPA: [t͈ɕam.p͈oŋ]

Jjamppong (Korean: 짬뽕) is a Chinese-style Korean noodle soup with red, spicy seafood- or pork-based broth flavored with gochugaru (chili powder). Common ingredients include onions, garlic, Korean zucchini, carrots, cabbages, squid, mussels, and pork. The dish was inspired by Chinese cuisine.

Along with jajangmyeon, it is a popular dish found predominantly in Chinese restaurants in Korea as part of Korean Chinese cuisine.

== History and etymology ==
While the dish is derived from the Chinese Shandong-style chǎomǎmiàn (炒碼麵), the name of the dish was derived from chanpon, a Japanese Chinese cuisine dish itself derived from the Fujian-style mènmiàn (燜麵). During the Japanese occupation of Korea (1910–1945), the Japanese saw chǎomǎmiàn in Chinese restaurants in Korea and named it chanpon, as the white soup seemed similar to the soup of chanpon to their eyes. The Japanese word was subsequently adapted phonetically into Korean as jjamppong.

When considering how chanpon is made, it is assumed that the exported version of chǎomǎmiàn, a type of tāngròusīmiàn (湯肉絲麵), would have used boiled pork and chicken bones to make the broth, while the base broth of jjamppong differs in that it mainly uses stir-fried seafood and vegetables with the addition of gochugaru (chili powder) and chili oil, a practice that began in the 1960s.

== Variations ==
Samseon jjamppong

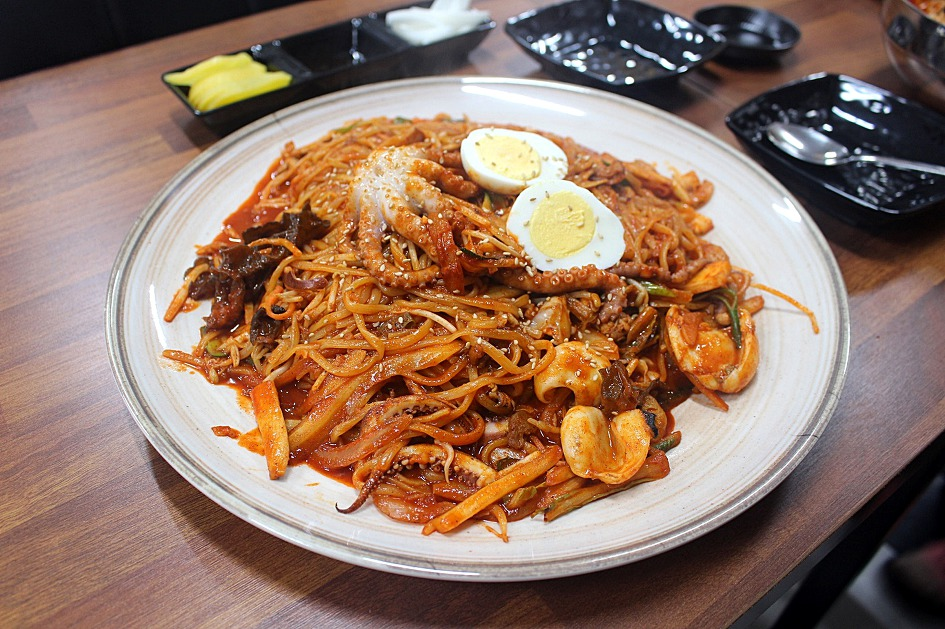
Gan-jjamppong (dry version)

In some restaurants, samseon jjamppong (삼선짬뽕) refers to a more expensive option with additional varieties of seafood. Inspired by gamja-tang, pork back-bone jjamppong (뼈짬뽕) uses a mix of pork bone broth, stir fried seafood, chili oil, and vegetables. Gul jjamppong (굴짬뽕) contains oysters and is usually served with a spicy white broth, also called sacheon tangmyeon (사천탕면). Gochu jjamppong refers to a jjamppong with additional spiciness using Cheongyang chili pepper. A panfried variety of jjamppong is also served at some restaurants. In jjamppong bap (짬뽕밥), rice is used in the place of noodles.

== See also ==
- Champon
- Jajangmyeon
