= Ulmyeon =

Korean-Chinese noodle dish

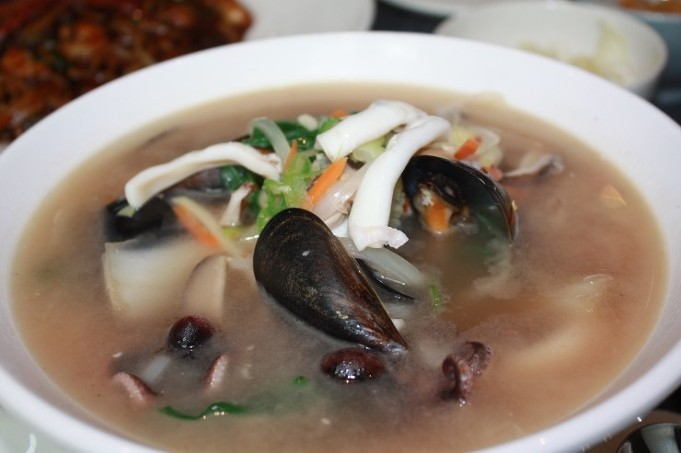
- Place of origin: Korea
- Associated cuisine: Korean Chinese cuisine
- Main ingredients: Noodles, vegetables (shiitake mushrooms, white button mushrooms, carrots), eggs, seafood (sea cucumber, shrimp, squid or cuttlefish), broth, cornstarch
- Variations: Samseon-ulmyeon

Ulmyeon (Korean: 울면) is a dish of Korean-Chinese noodles, vegetables (including shiitake mushrooms, white button mushrooms, and carrots), egg, and seafood (including sea cucumber, shrimp, and squid or cuttlefish) in a chowder-like broth that is thickened with cornstarch. It is derived from a Chinese dish called wēnlŭmiàn (溫滷麵). It is often served in Korean Chinese restaurants as a non-spicy alternative to jjamppong. A variation on the dish is samseon ulmyeon (삼선울면 "3-ingredient ulmyeon"), which is a more expensive option that contains additional portions and/or varieties of seafood.
