= Hiyashi chūka =

Chinese-style Japanese noodle dish

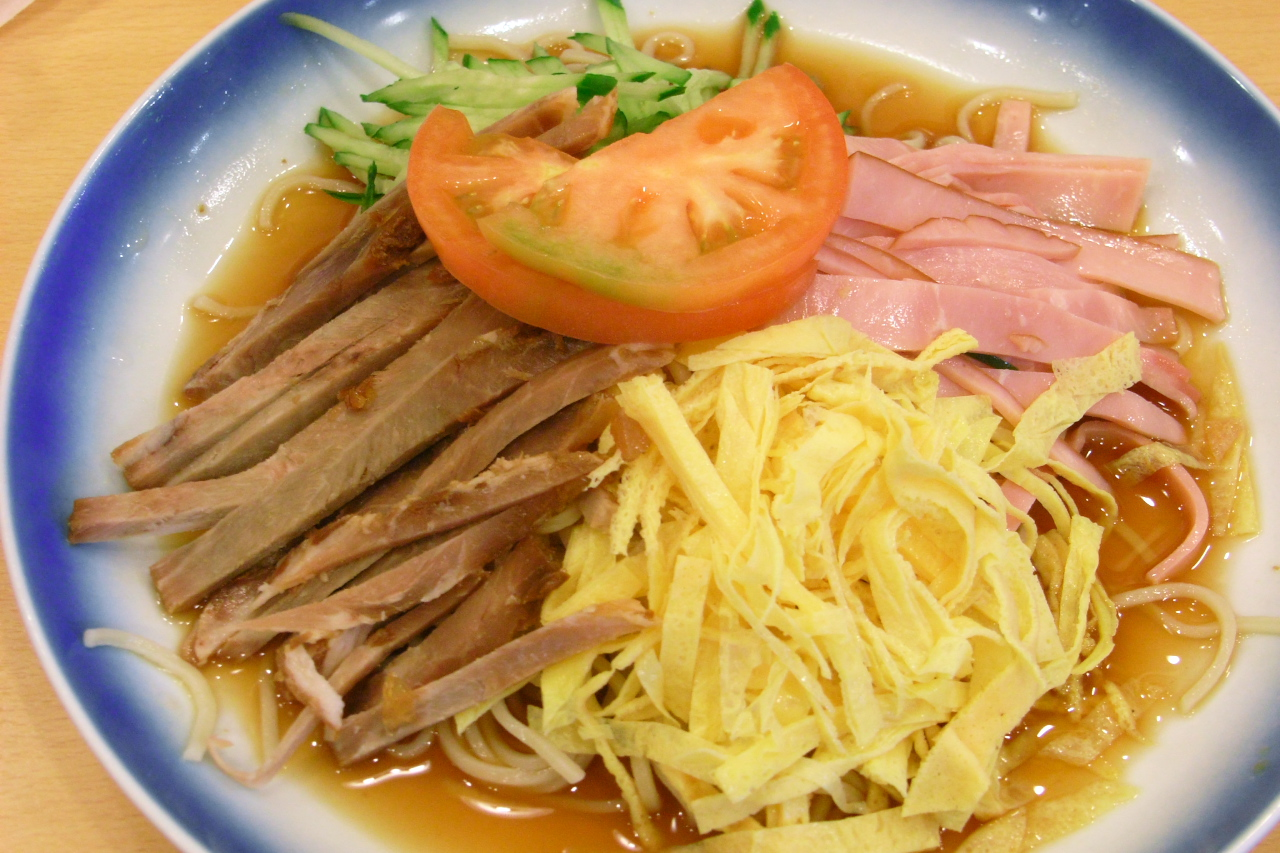
- Hiyashi chūka topped with ham, egg strips, cucumber, tomato and chāshū
- Alternative names: Reimen
- Type: Chinese noodle
- Place of origin: Sendai, Japan
- Main ingredients: Chilled Chinese alkaline wheat noodles
- Similar dishes: Liangbanmian

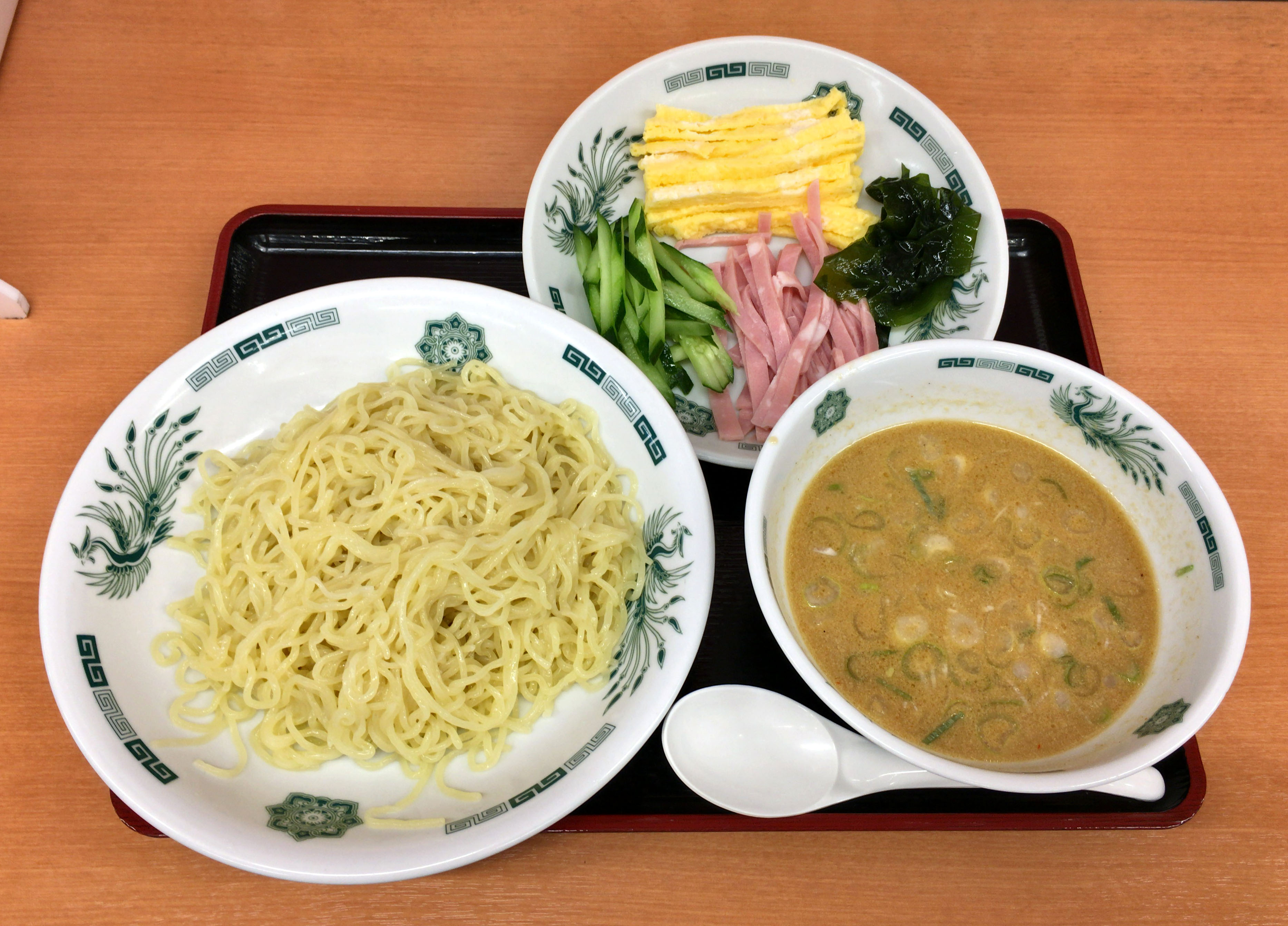
Hiyashi chūka tsukemen

Hiyashi chūka (冷やし中華; literally "chilled Chinese") is a Chinese-style Japanese dish consisting of chilled Chinese-style alkaline wheat noodles (中華麺, chūkamen), with various toppings. It is usually served in the summer. It is also called reimen (冷麺; literally "chilled noodle") in Kansai region and hiyashi rāmen (冷やしラーメン; literally "chilled ramen") in Hokkaido. Toppings are usually colorful cold ingredients and a tare sauce.

The dish was invented in 1937 by the Chinese restaurant Ryutei in Sendai as an adaptation of the Shanghainese dish liangbanmian (simplified Chinese: 凉拌面; traditional Chinese: 涼拌麵; pinyin: liángbànmiàn; lit. 'chilled mixed noodles'). The dish was originally sold in Japan under the borrowed Chinese name ryanbanmyen (リャンバンミェン). The name "hiyashi chuka" was established in the late 1950s.

Popular toppings for hiyashi chuka are meat (ham, boiled chicken, or char siu), strips of tamagoyaki (egg omelette), summer vegetables like cucumber and tomatoes, menma (Chinese lacto-fermented bamboo shoots), and beni shōga (pickled ginger) as a condiment. Toppings are cut thin, to mix well with the noodles and the sauce. The tare sauce is usually made with a base of either soy sauce and rice vinegar, or sesame seeds and mayonnaise called gomadare (ゴマだれ)

== See also ==
- Jungguk-naengmyeon
- List of ramen dishes
