= Korean Chinese cuisine =

Cuisine of the ethnic Chinese in Korea

- Hangul: 중화요리
- Hanja: 中華料理
- RR: junghwayori
- MR: chunghwayori
- IPA: [tɕuŋhwajoɾi]

Korean Chinese cuisine (Korean: 중화요리; Hanja: 中華料理), also known as Sino–Korean cuisine, is a hybrid cuisine developed by the ethnic Chinese in Korea.

Despite originally being derived from Chinese cuisine, Korean-Chinese cuisine consists of unique dishes with Korean flavours and ingredients, making it a hybrid cuisine.

In South Korea, the food is usually delivered. In other parts of the world, Korean Chinese dishes are typically served in Korean restaurants as well as in Chinese restaurants whose owners are immigrants from Korea or if they are from a Chinese–Korean family.

== Characteristics ==
Korean-Chinese cuisine was first developed during the 19th century in the port city of Incheon, where most of the ethnic Chinese population of Korea lived. Due to geographic proximity and the demographics of the Korean Chinese population, most Korean Chinese dishes are derived from (or influenced by) northern, eastern and northeastern Chinese dishes mostly from Shandong, where the majority of the earlier Chinese immigrants in Korea were from.

== Dishes ==
Three primary Korean-Chinese dishes are served in most Korean Chinese restaurants in South Korea and elsewhere:

- Jajangmyeon (짜장면), often referred to as "black bean noodles", is a noodle dish topped with a thick sauce made of sweet bean sauce (chunjang), diced pork or seafood, and vegetables. Derived from the Shandong zhájiàngmiàn (炸醬麵), Korean jajangmyeon is distinct from the zhájiàngmiàn dishes served in China.
- Jjamppong (짬뽕) is a spicy noodle soup flavored with vegetables, meat or seafood, and chili oil. The dish derived from the Shandong chǎomǎmiàn (炒碼麵) and its name derived from chanpon, a Japanese Chinese dish derived from the Fujian mènmiàn (燜麵). The addition of chili powder (gochugaru) and chili oil to jjamppong began during the 1960s.
- Tangsuyuk (탕수육) is a Korean version of a sweet and sour meat dish derived from Shandong Cuisine's tángcùròu (糖醋肉). It can be made with pork or beef, coated with corn- or potato starch or glutinous rice flour. The dish is served with a sweet-and-sour sauce typically made with soy sauce, vinegar, sugar, corn or potato starch, and fruits and vegetables such as carrots, cucumbers, onions, wood ear mushrooms, apples, and pineapples.

Other dishes often served in Korean-Chinese restaurants include:

- Jungguk-naengmyeon (중국냉면; 中國冷麵; lit. 'Chinese cold noodles'), is enjoyed during the summer. Jungguk-naengmyeon is made with junghwa-myeon (Chinese noodles), shredded five-spice-marinated beef or pork (五香醬肉), cucumber, crab sticks, jellyfish and a fried egg in a cold chicken broth seasoned with soy sauce and spices. A sauce, mixed with mustard and peanut sauce, gives it a nutty, spicy flavor.
- Kkanpunggi (깐풍기, derived from gàn pēng jī (乾烹鷄), fried chicken (with or without bones) glazed with a sweet, spicy sauce.
- Kkanpung saeu (깐풍새우): Deep-fried, breaded sweet-and-sour shrimp, with a mild spiciness distinct from tangsuyuk, tangsu saeu and stir-fried Kung Pao shrimp (宮寶蝦) served in Chinese restaurants. Kkanpung saeu is served with a sweet sauce, peas, carrots, green onions and red chilli peppers.
- Rajogi (라조기, derived from làjiāojī (辣椒鷄), similar to the Sichuan laziji, a Chinese chili chicken dish.
- Udong (우동), a noodle soup similar to jjamppong but with non-spicy white soup, derived from Shandong-style dǎlǔmiàn (打滷麵) and not related to either Japanese udon or Korean-style udon (also called udong in Korean) despite the name. In Korean, udong refers to several types of noodle dishes (typically noodle soups) and thus the term used here is non-specific and not exclusive to Korean Chinese cuisine.
- Ulmyeon (울면), similar to udon, consists of wheat-flour noodles, chopped vegetables and seafood in a chowder-like broth thickened with cornstarch. It is derived from a Chinese dish, wēnlŭmiàn (溫滷麵).

Dumplings are also served at Korean-Chinese restaurants, usually a pan-fried cross between Chinese jiaozi and Korean mandu. Dried red chili flakes are provided to season food or mixed with soy sauce.

Koreans traditionally eat Chinese food with a side dish of danmuji (yellow pickled radishes) and raw onion dipped in unfried chunjang. Kimchi, a Korean staple, is also eaten with Korean-Chinese food.

Hotteok is a Korean-Chinese food item that is now commonly sold as a street food.

== Gallery ==
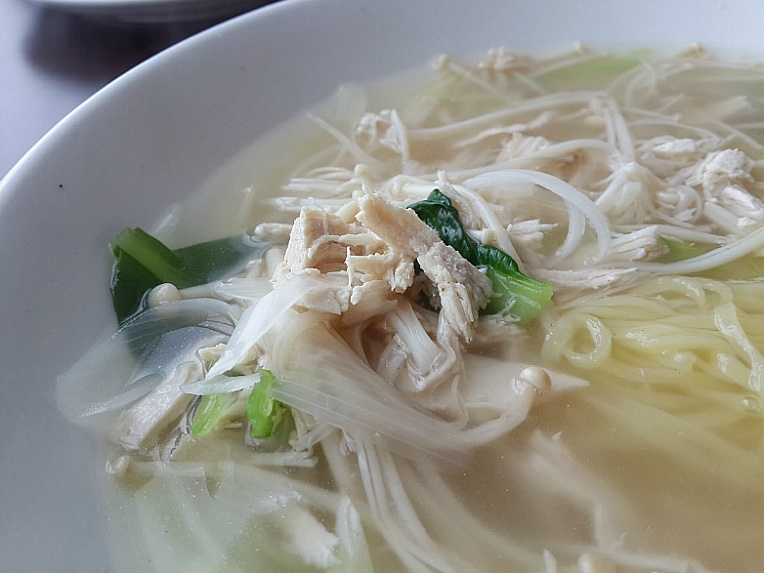
Giseu-myeon (shredded chicken soup)

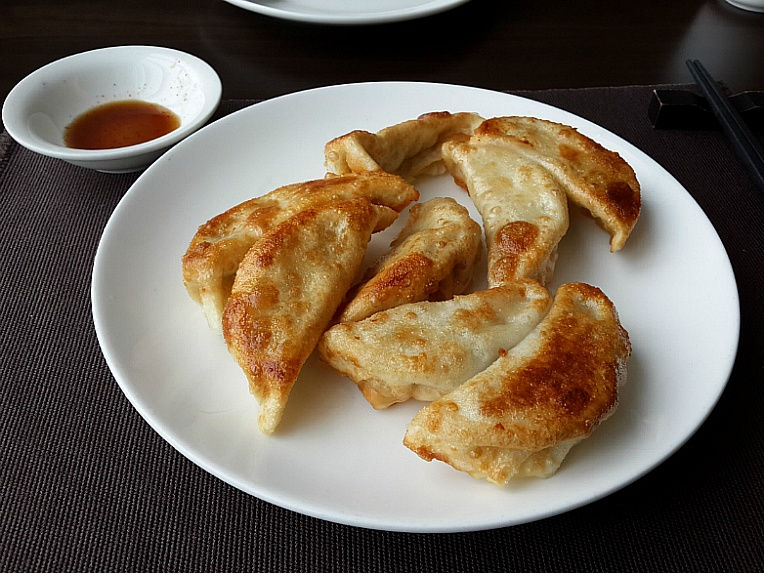
Gun-mandu (pan-fried dumplings)

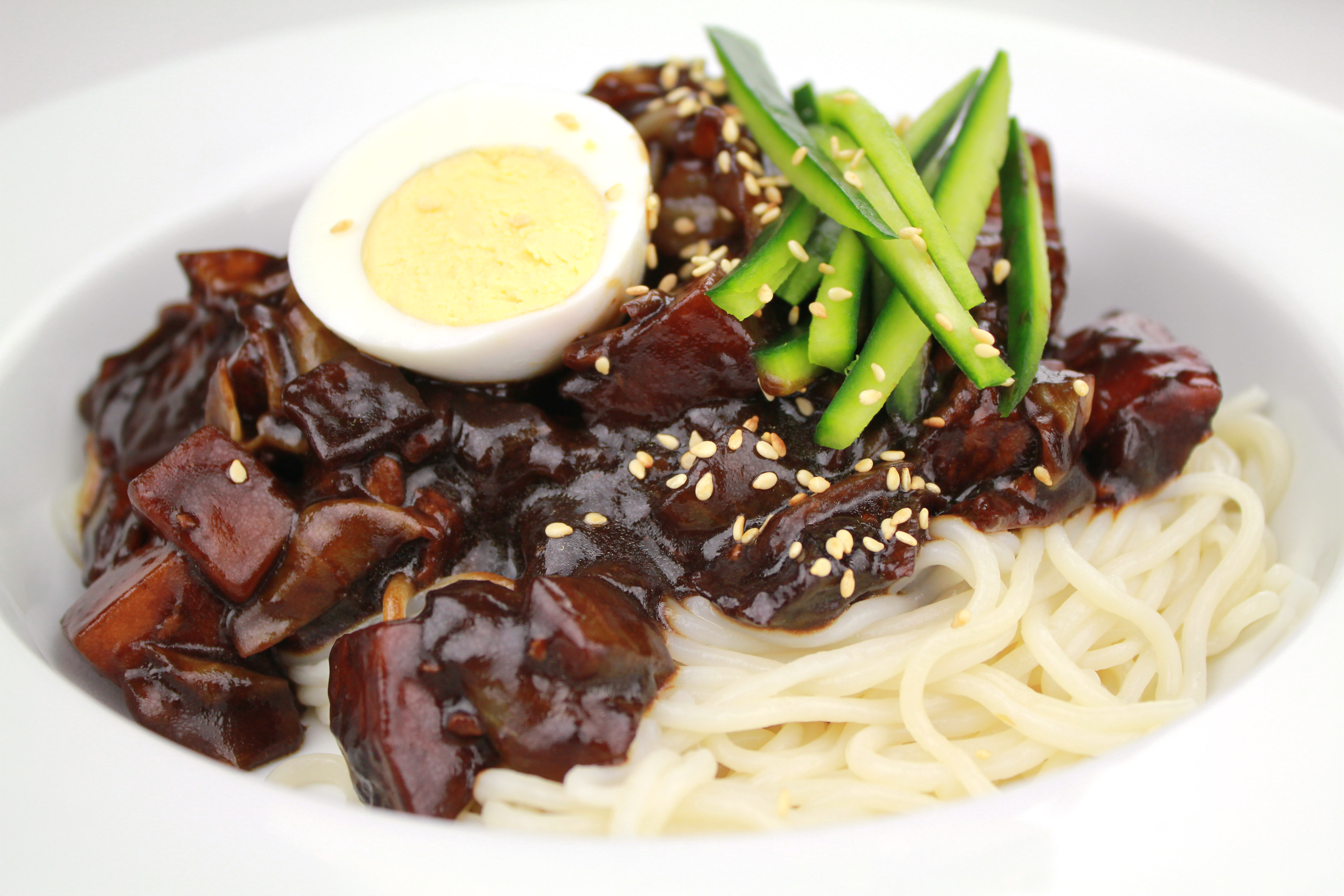
Jajangmyeon (black sauce noodles)

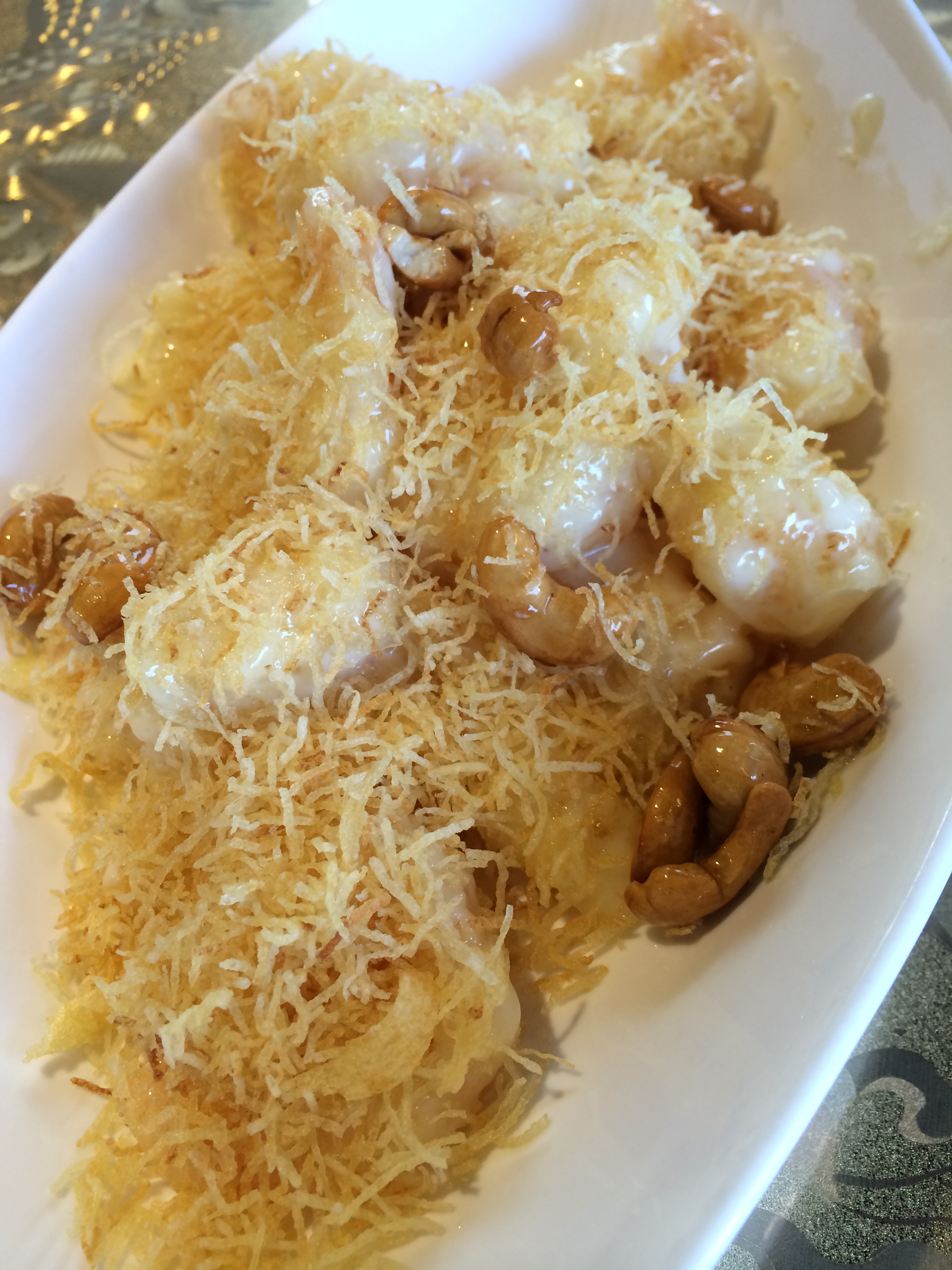
Keurim-saeu (cream shrimp)

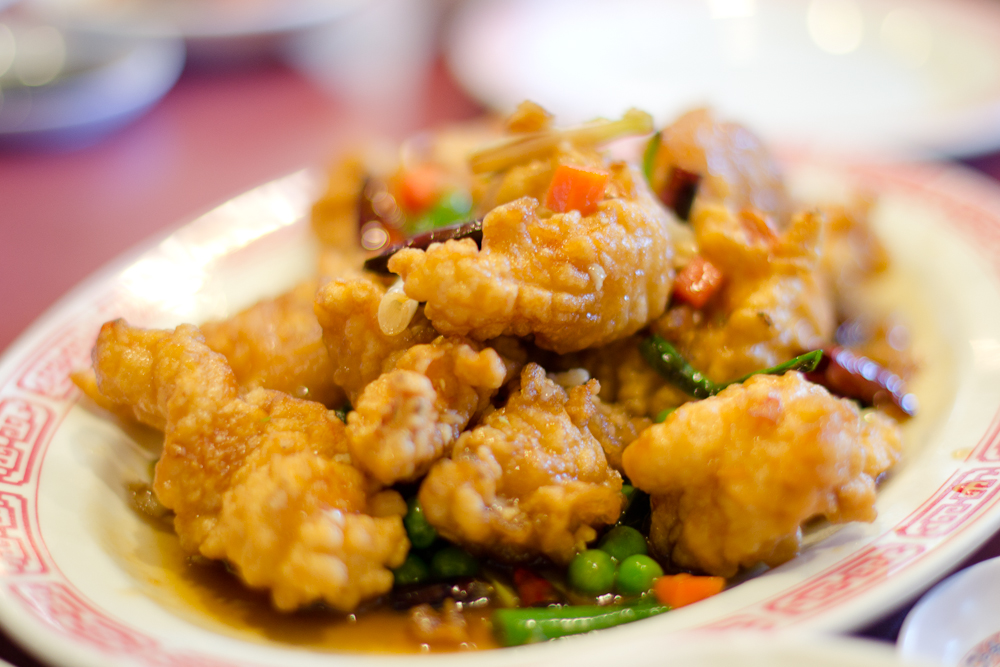
Kkanpunggi (spicy garlic fried chicken)

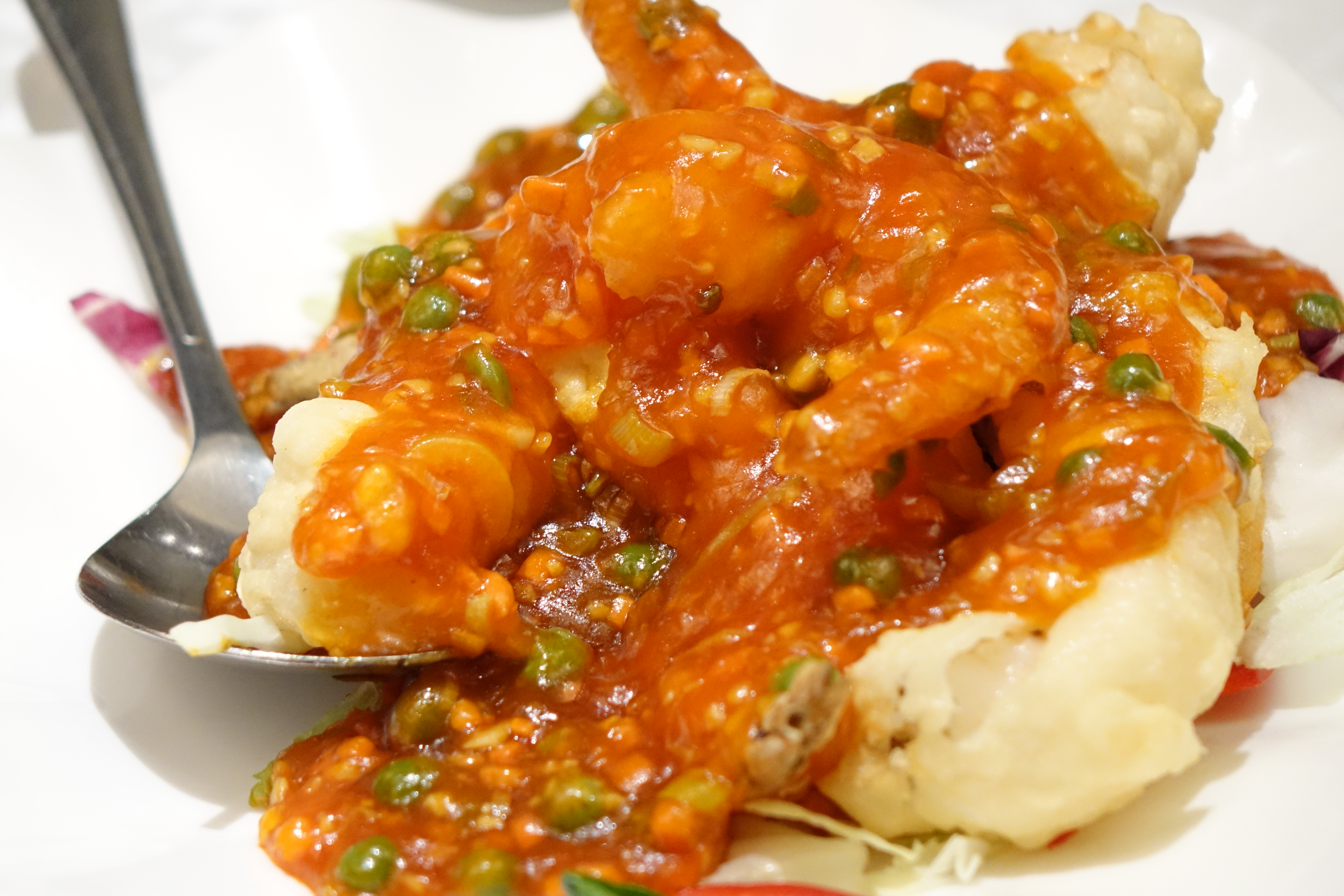
Kkansyo-saeu (chili shrimp)

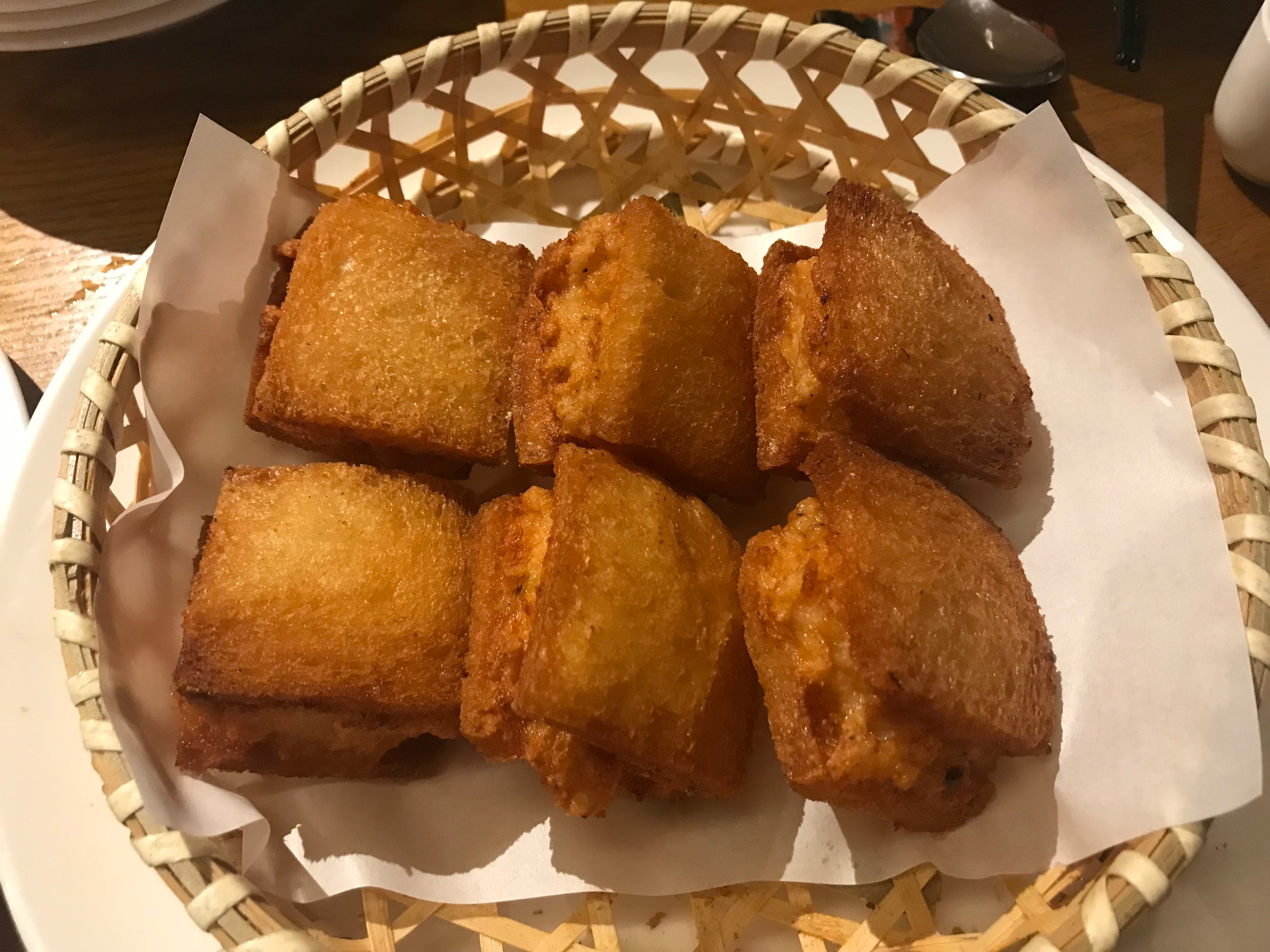
Menbosya (shrimp toast)

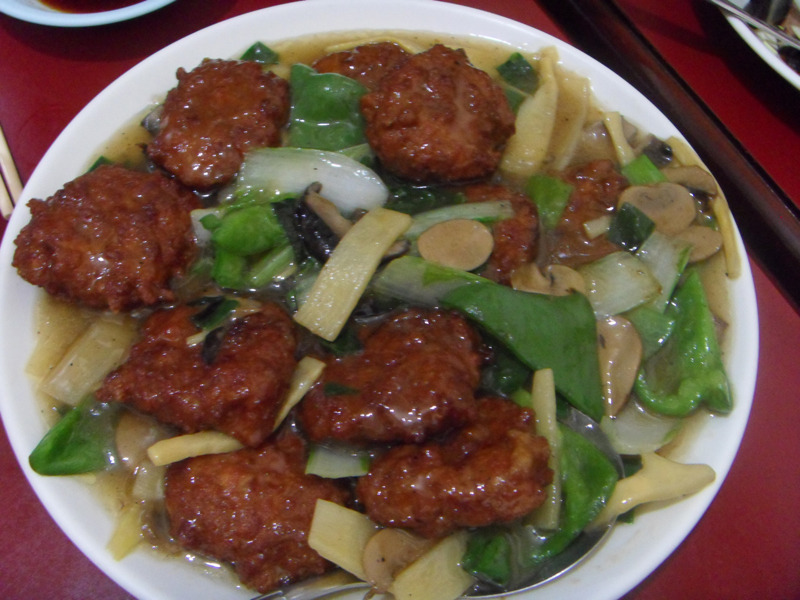
Nanja-wanseu (meatballs)

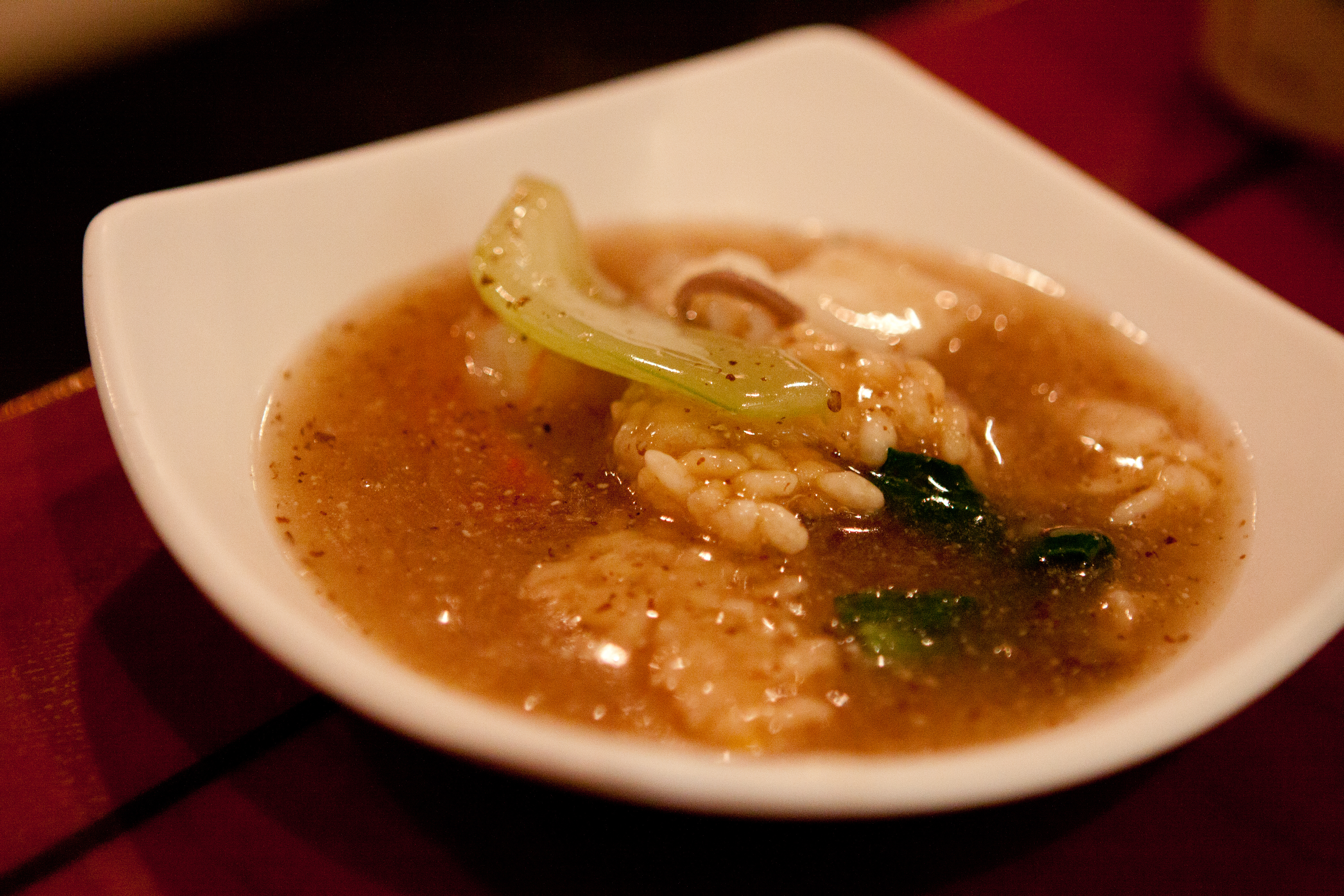
Nurungji-tang (scorched rice soup)

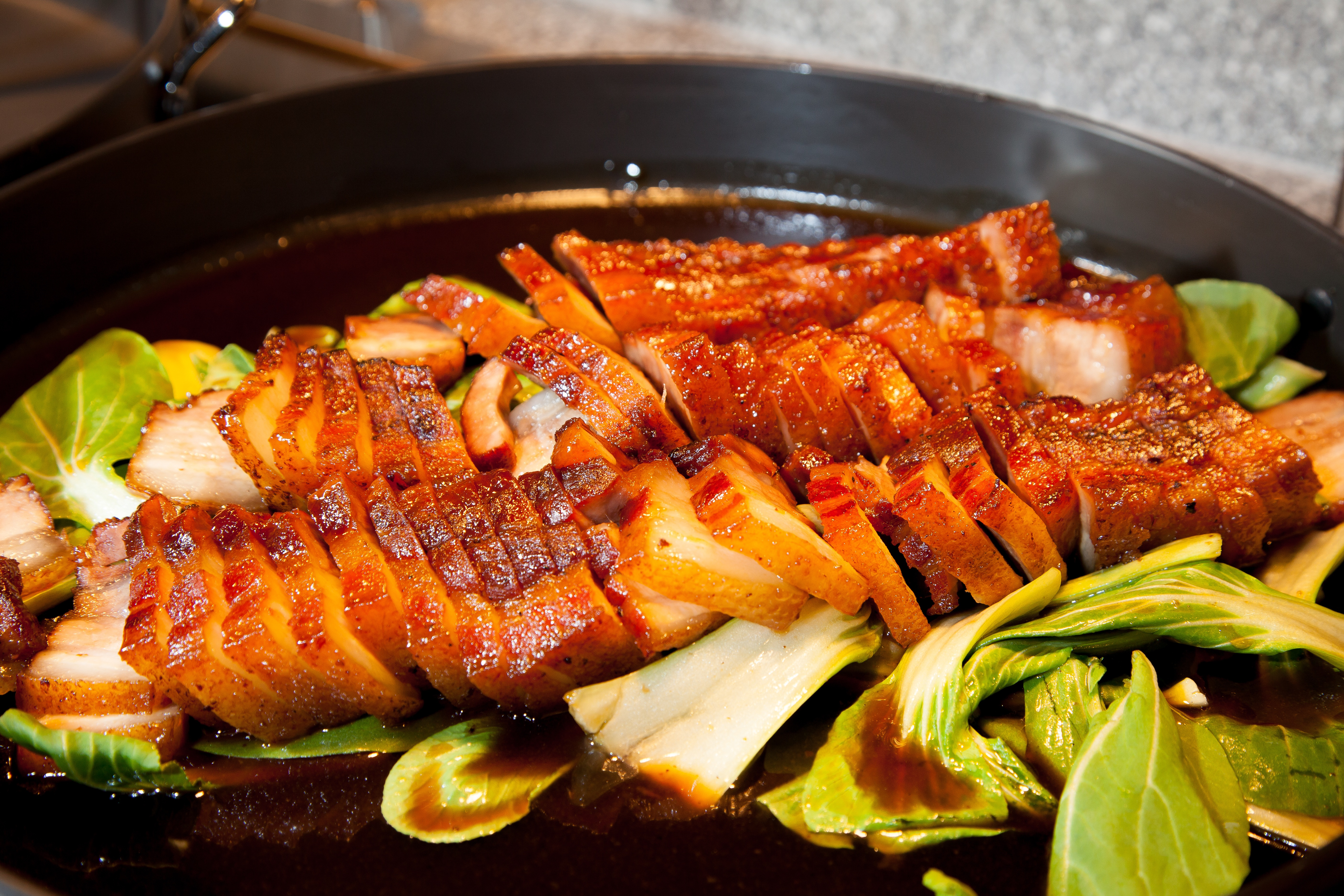
Ohyang-jangyuk (steamed five spice pork slices)

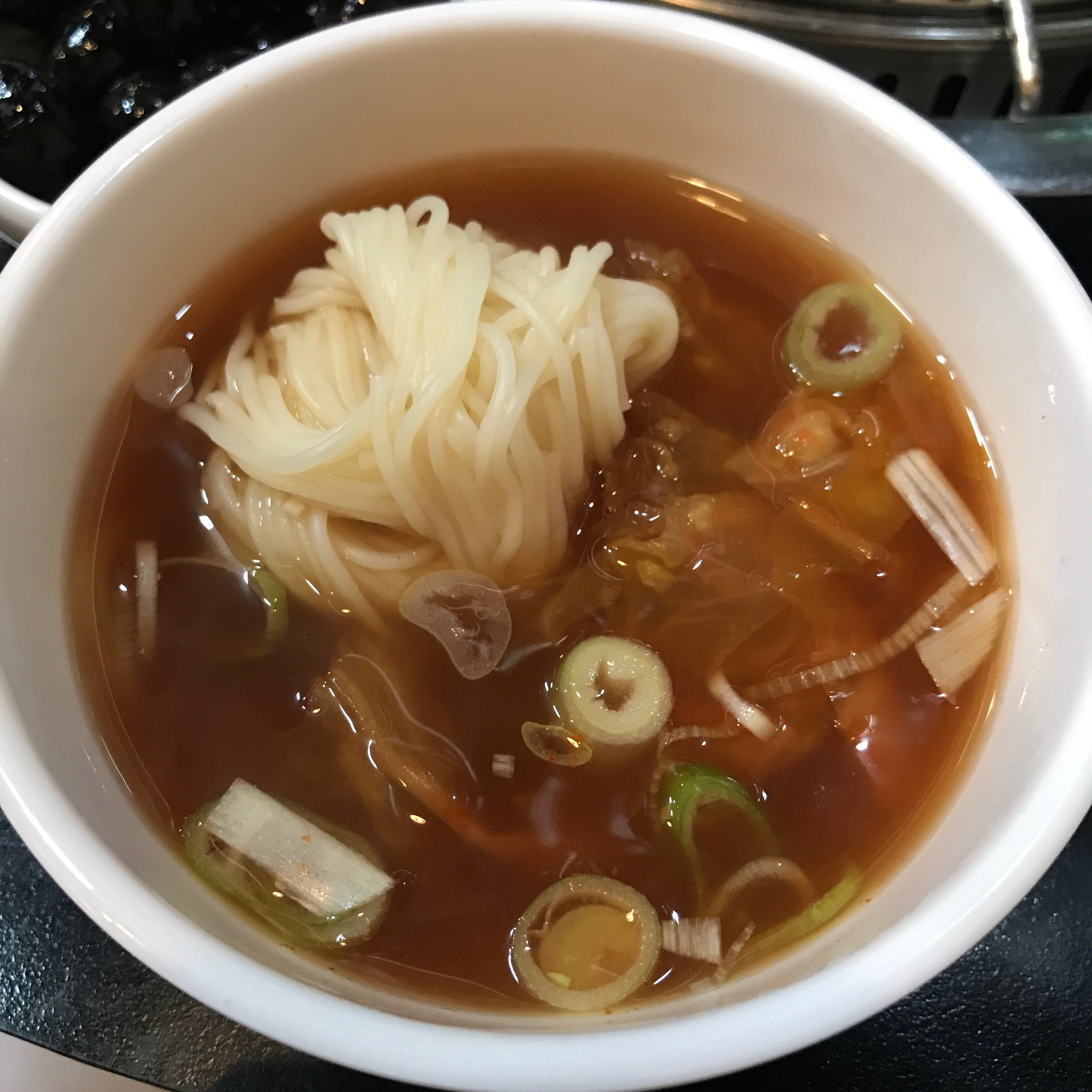
Oksusu-onmyeon (corn noodle soup)

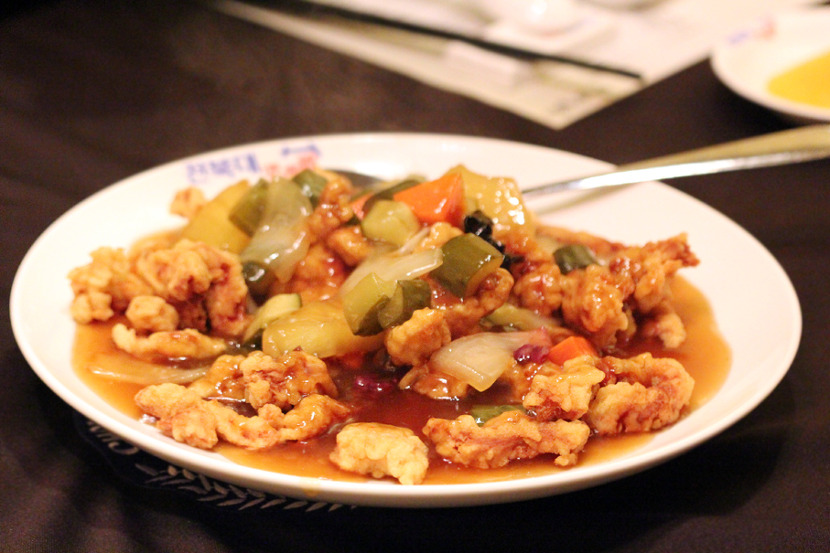
Tangsuyuk (sweet and sour pork)

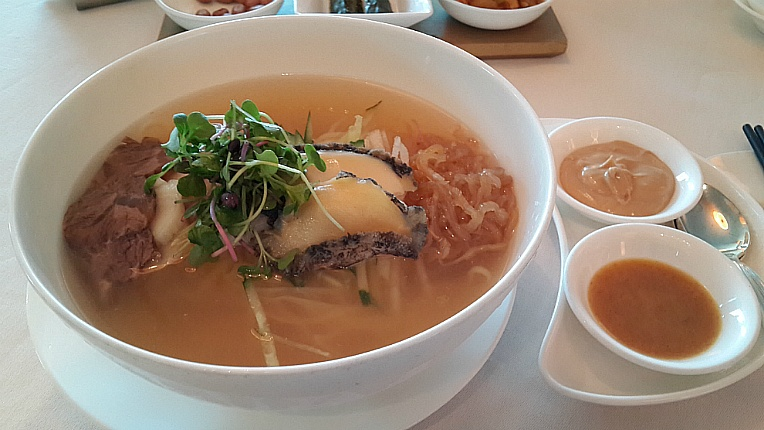
Jungguk-naengmyeon (Chinese cold noodle soup)

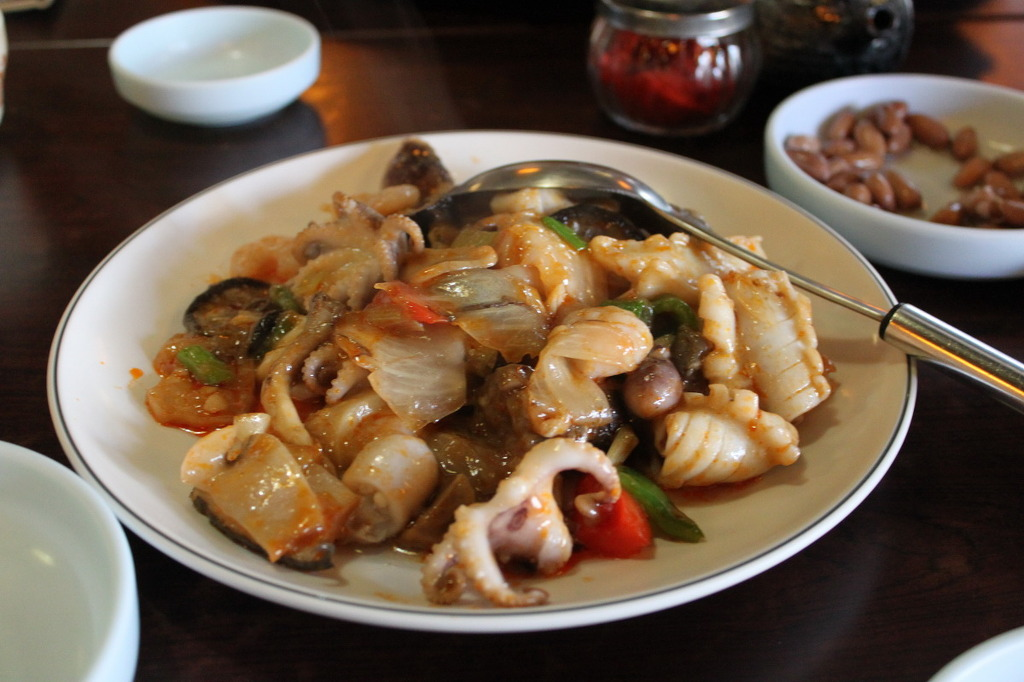
Palbochae (eight treasure dish)

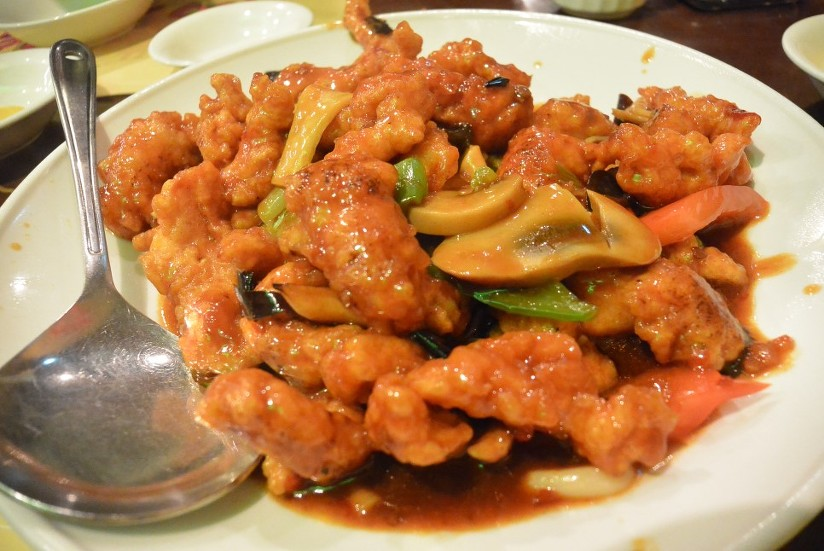
Rajogi (chili chicken)

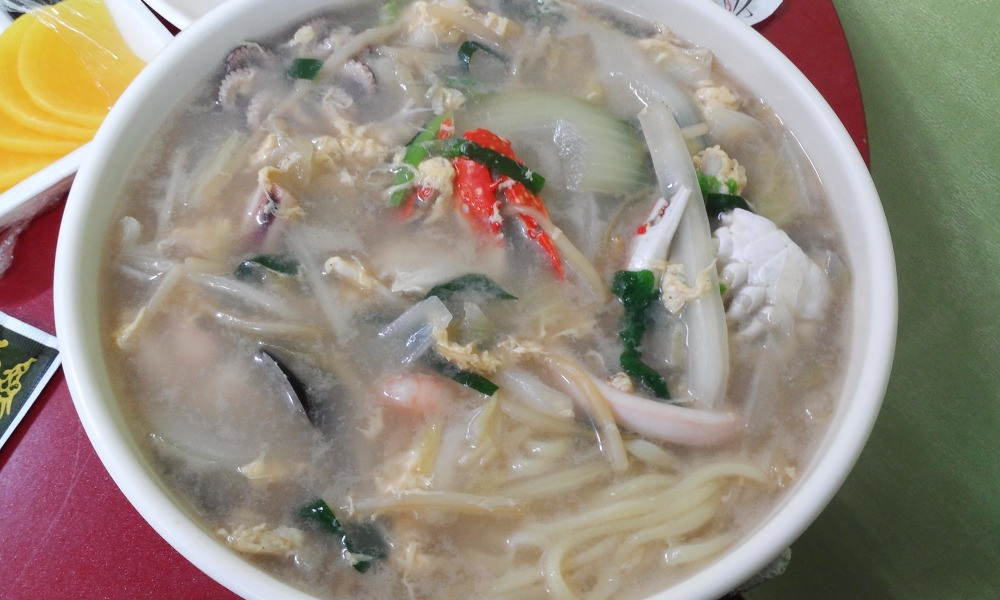
Chinese-style udong (seafood noodle soup)

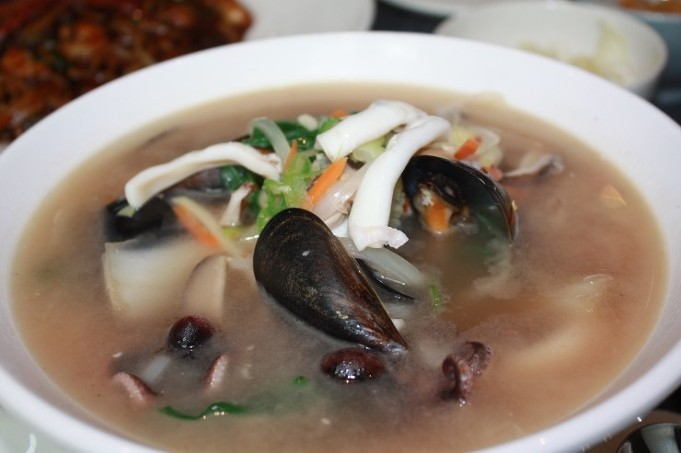
Ulmyeon (noodles and seafood in egg soup)

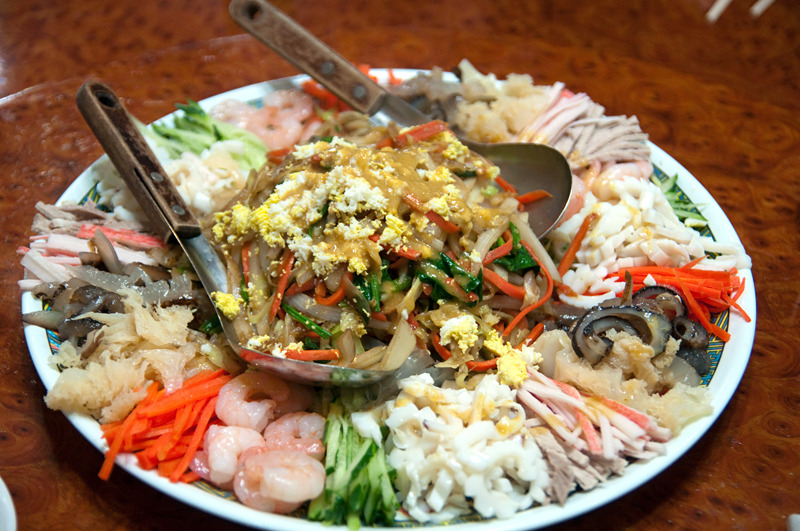
Yangjangpi (seafood salad with hot mustard sauce)

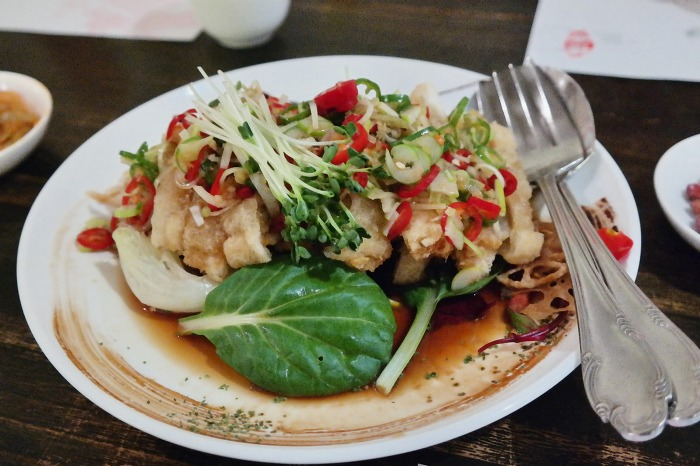
Yuringi (fried chicken with scallions in hot and sour soy sauce)

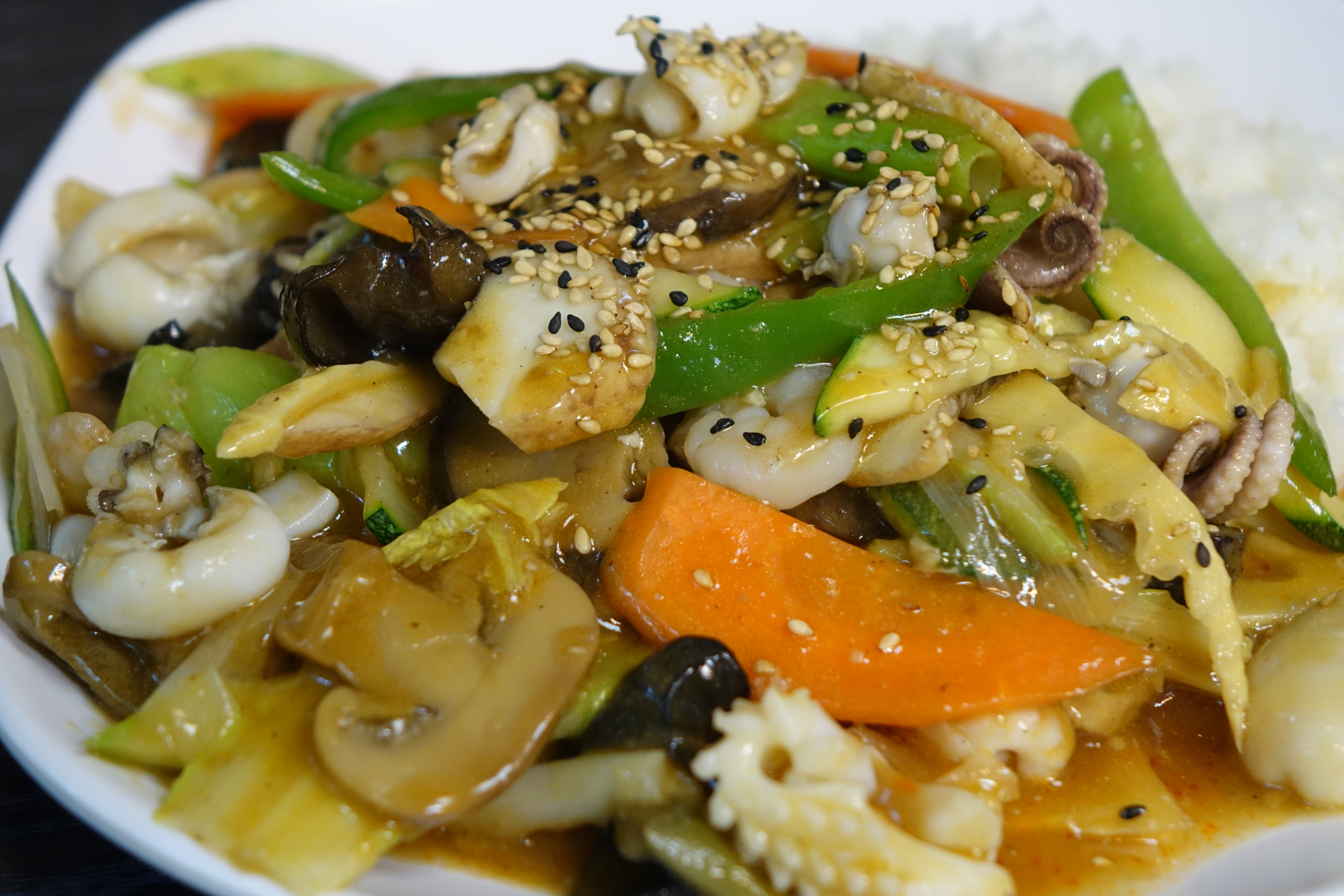
Yusanseul (stir-fried three ingredient dish)

== See also ==
- Chinese people in Korea
- American Chinese cuisine
- Japanese Chinese cuisine
