= Champon =

Noodle dish from Japanese-Chinese cuisine

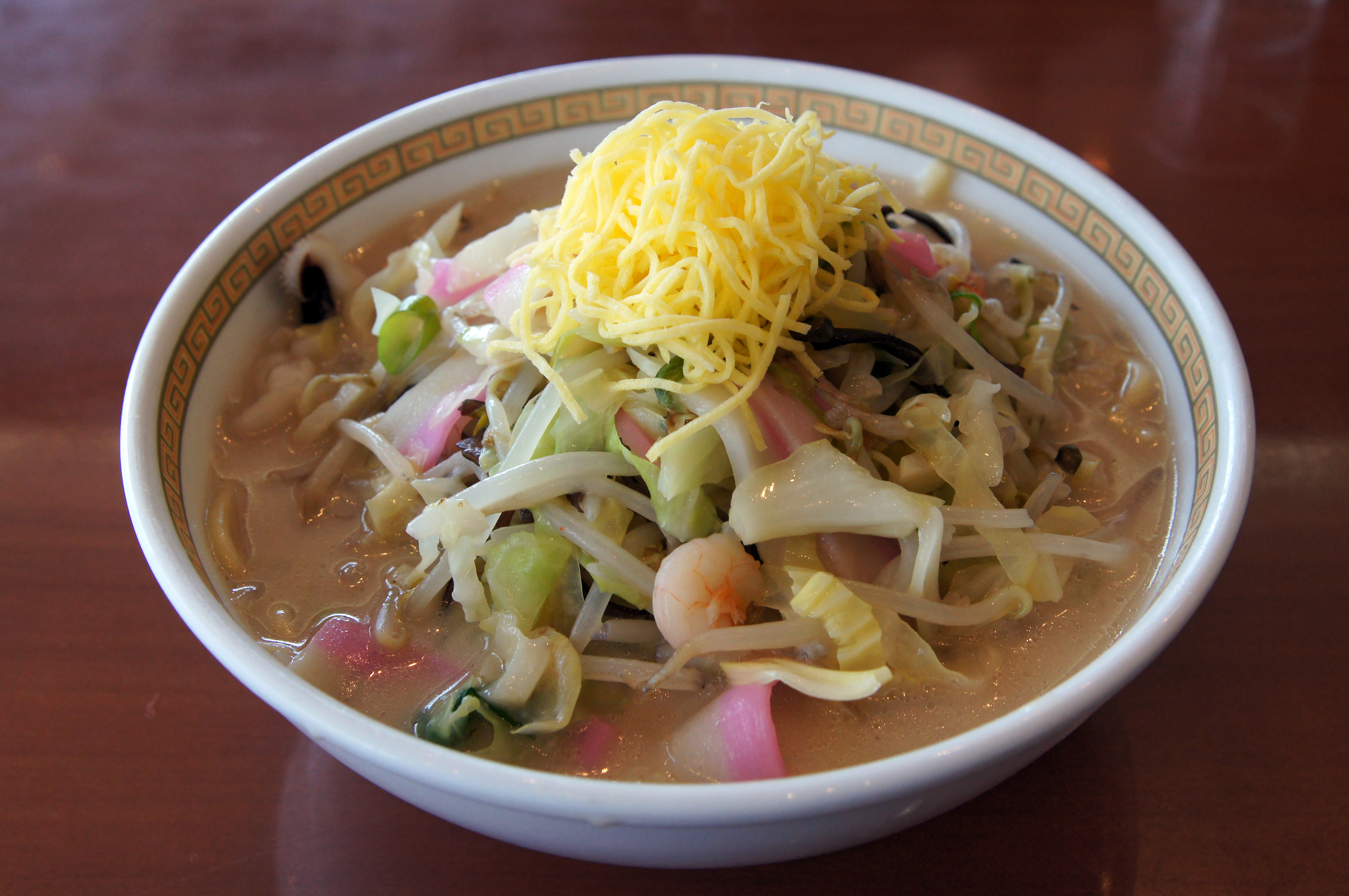
- Original Shikairō Champon
- Type: Noodle soup
- Place of origin: Japan
- Region or state: Nagasaki
- Associated cuisine: Japanese cuisine
- Created by: restaurant in Nagasaki
- Main ingredients: ramen noodles, fried pork, seafood, and vegetables

Champon (ちゃんぽん, Chanpon), also known as Chanpon, is a noodle dish that is a regional cuisine of Nagasaki, Japan. There are different versions in Japan, Korea and China.

Champon is made by frying pork, seafood and vegetables with lard; a soup made with chicken and pig bones is then added. Ramen noodles made especially for champon are added and then boiled. Unlike other ramen dishes, only one pan is needed as the noodles are boiled in the soup. Depending on the season and the situation, the ingredients differ. Hence the taste and style may depend on the location and time of year.

Although Nagasaki Champon is the best-known rendition, there are other variations found in Japan. Ankake no Champon is a soy-sauce based variant found in Tottori, Shimane Prefectures, as well as the city of Amagasaki in Hyōgo Prefecture. In the city of Akita, a version with miso broth is served, with the soup filling the bowl almost to the point of overflowing.

In Okinawa, Champon is a rice dish where assorted vegetables, thinly sliced meat (pork, luncheon meat or corned beef hash) and scrambled egg are fried and served on top of rice. The Korean Jjamppong is a similar noodle dish with a spicy seafood broth, with similar origins as part of Korean Chinese cuisine.

== History ==
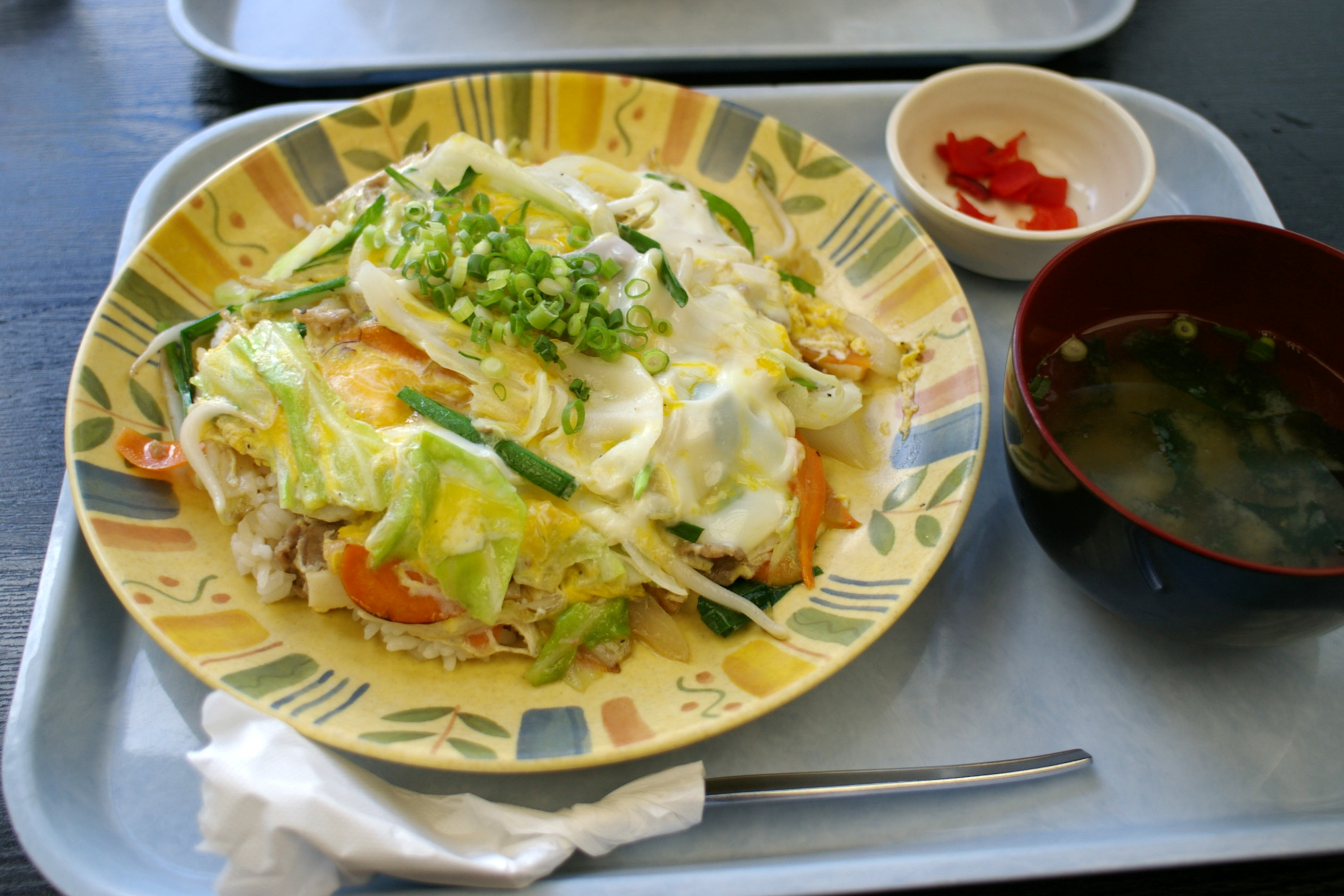
Champon from Okinawa is a rice dish served with assorted vegetables and scrambled egg.

Champon was created in the late nineteenth century by Chikusa Shokai (also rendered Tanaka Chikusa). It was first served by Shikairō (四海楼, Four Seas House), a Chinese restaurant founded in Nagasaki in 1899. According to the restaurant's website, this was based on a dish in Fujian cuisine, "tang rousi mian" (湯肉絲麵), more commonly known as rousi tangmian (肉丝汤面). However, some have cast doubt on this claim as the rousi tangmian originates not from Fujian but from Jiangnan. Furthermore, the champon bears far greater resemblance to Gangtou menmian (港頭燜麵), a dish native to Fuqing, than it does to rousi tangmian.

The majority of the Chinese population in Nagasaki Chinatown is from Fujian. In the middle of the Meiji era (late 19th century – early 20th century), the owner saw a need for a cheap, filling meal that suited the palates of hundreds of Chinese students who came to Japan for school. Nowadays, champon is a popular specialty food (or meibutsu) of Nagasaki.

== Etymology ==
There are several theories as to the origin of the word champon. One theory is that it was derived from the Hokkien word chia̍h-pn̄g (食飯), which means "to eat a meal", which might fit the sense of "a hearty noodle dish made of mixed ingredients". Another theory is that the word was derived from the word campur from Indonesian, meaning "mixed" (see Nasi campur, a Javanese dish), which would fit the term's older sense of "mixed together".

The original sense of "mixed together" appears in texts from the mid-1700s. Some Japanese dictionaries trace this to Chinese term 攙和 ("to mix"), pronounced as chham-hô in modern Min-Nan and as chānhuò in modern Mandarin.

Usage to refer to the food item appears from the late 19th century to early 20th century, apparently originating from the Shikairō Chinese restaurant in Nagasaki.

== Gallery ==
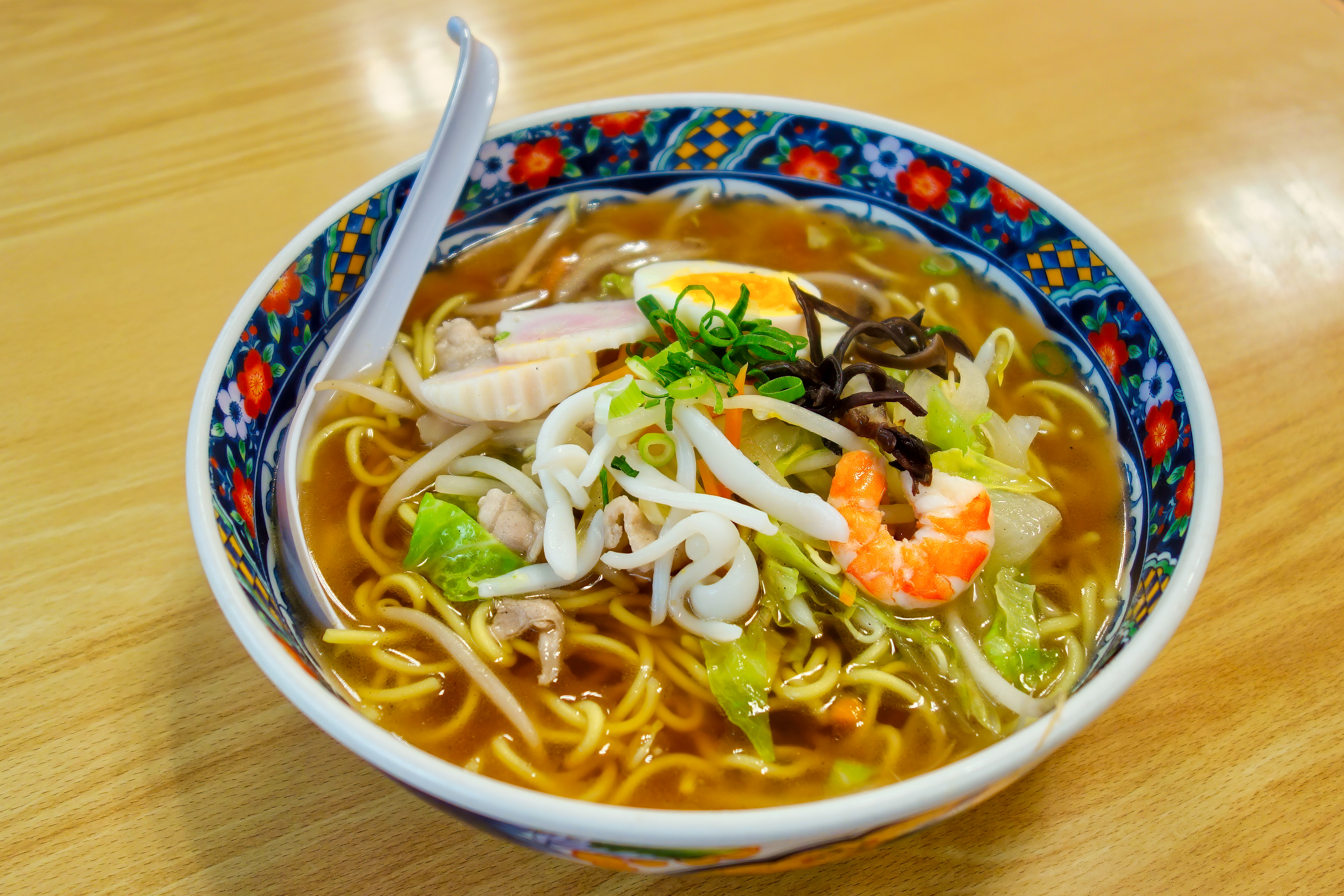

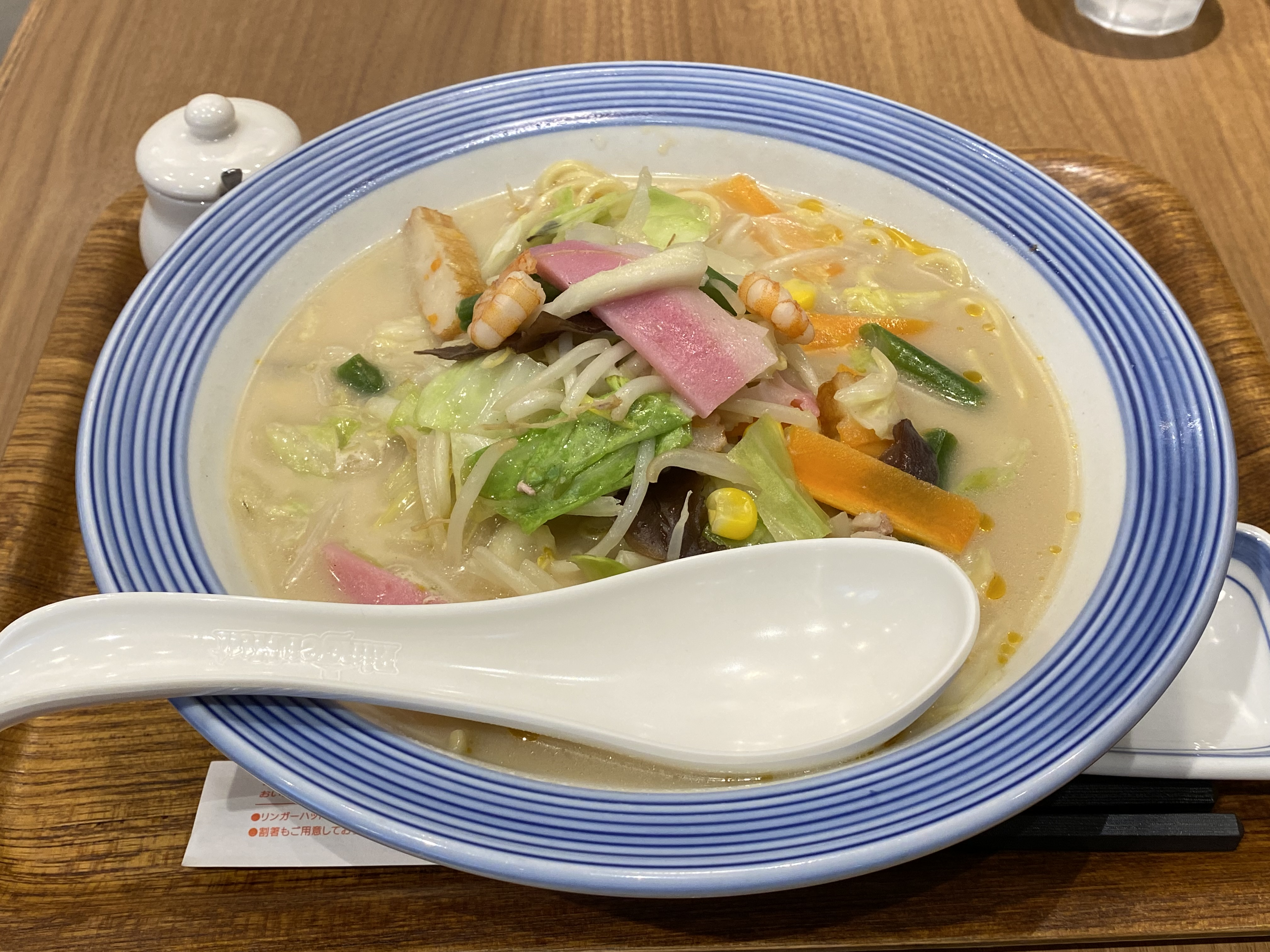

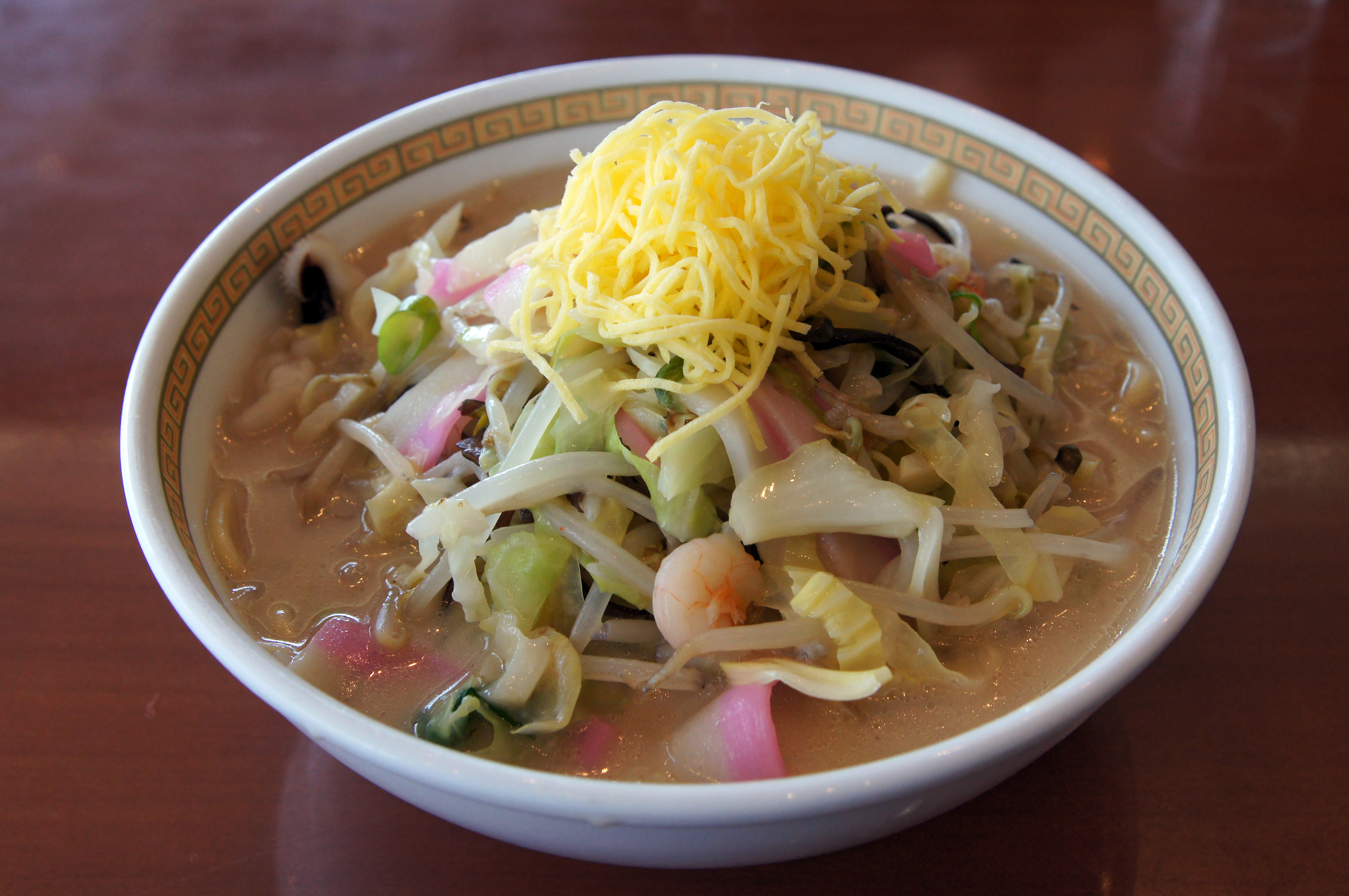

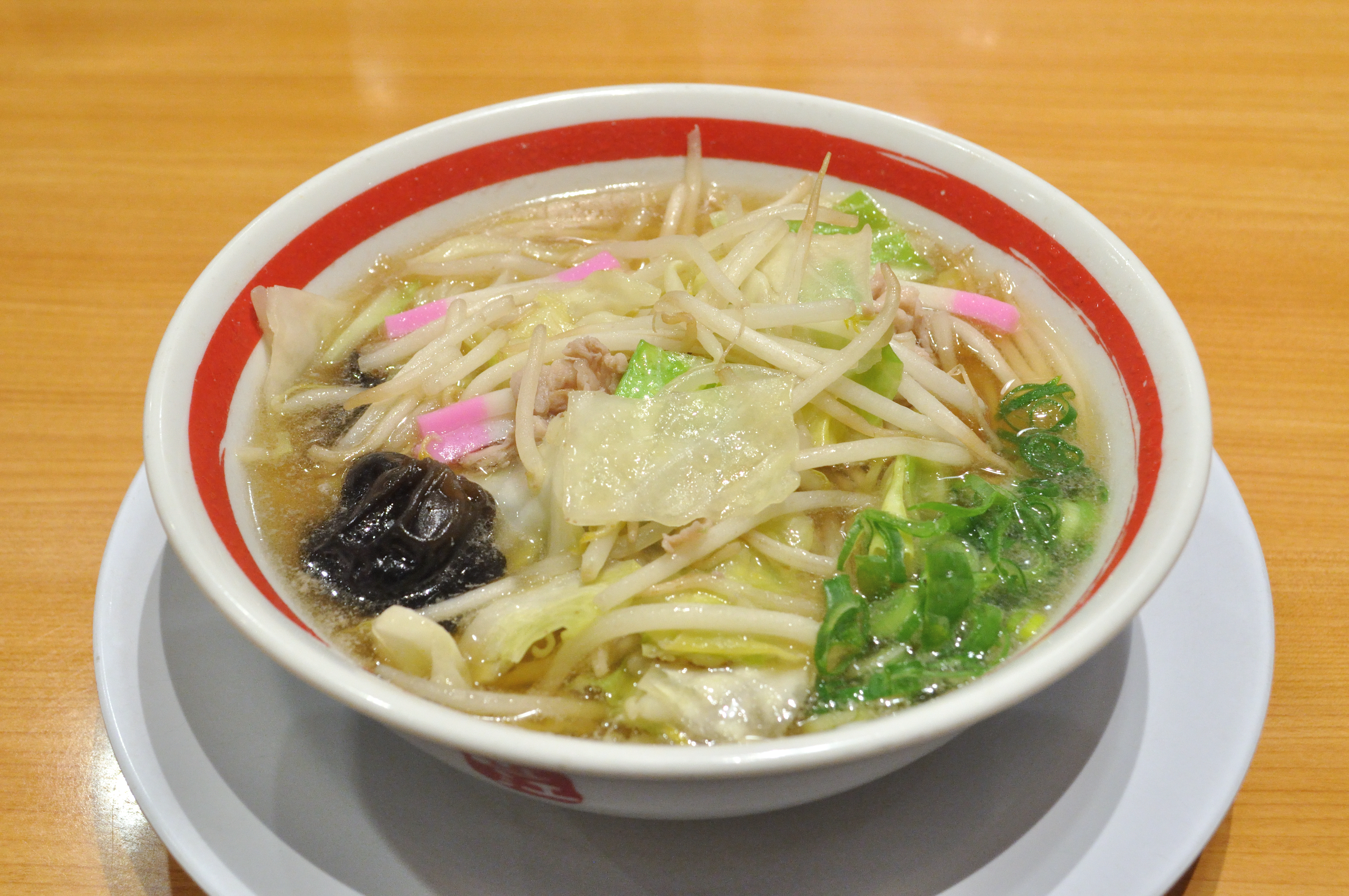

== See also ==
- Jjamppong
- List of ramen dishes
- Japanese Chinese cuisine
