= Jungguk-naengmyeon =

Korean-Chinese noodle dish

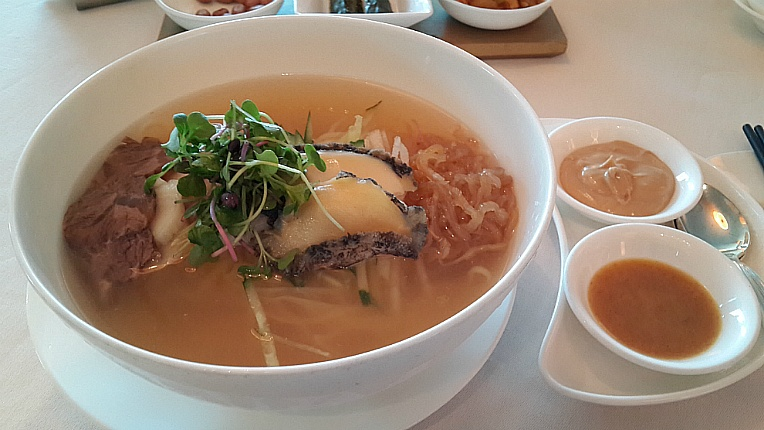
- Korean Chinese cold noodles served with mustard and peanut sauce
- Alternative names: Korean Chinese cold noodles
- Type: Naengmyeon; noodle soup
- Place of origin: South Korea
- Associated cuisine: Korean Chinese cuisine
- Serving temperature: Cold

Korean name
- Hangul: 중국냉면
- Hanja: 中國冷麵
- RR: Jungguk naengmyeon
- MR: Chungguk naengmyŏn
- IPA: [tɕuŋ.ɡuŋ.nɛ̝ŋ.mjʌn]

Jungguk-naengmyeon (Korean: 중국냉면; Hanja: 中國冷麵; lit. 'Chinese cold noodles') is a type of naengmyeon (cold noodles) in Korean Chinese cuisine. The dish, consisting of icy cold broth with noodles, blanched seafood, fresh vegetables, and hard-boiled egg, is usually served with mustard and peanut sauce.

== History ==
Despite the name, the dish originated in Korea. The flavour profile is influenced by chilled noodle dishes in Chinese cuisine, such as liáng miàn (涼麵) and gān bàn miàn (乾拌麵), which are served cold but are not noodle soups. The Korean Chinese dish incorporates the Korean tradition of serving noodles in icy cold broth (naengmyeon).

Early records of the dish includes the mentioning of junghwa-yori-sik naengmyeon (중화요리식 냉면, transl. "Chinese cuisine-style cold noodles") on 22 June 1947 in the newspaper The Jeju Sinbo, and mentioning of jungguk-naengmyeon (중국냉면, transl. "Chinese cold noodles") in The Dong-A Ilbo on 25 September 1962. It is assumed that the dish was popularized in South Korea during the 1960s, when Chinese-style peanut sauce was largely replaced by peanut butter from U.S. military bases. In 1980s, high-end Korean Chinese restaurants in major hotels began to serve this dish.

== Preparation and serving ==
Chicken broth is usually used in jungguk-naengmyeon. The broth, seasoned with ginger, onion, and rice wine, is served chilled with Chinese-style wheat noodles and toppings. Mustard and peanut sauce are usually added to the dish. The peanut sauce gives the soup a thick, cream-colored, opaque look and nutty flavor. Common toppings include slices of boiled meat, blanched seafood, such as shrimp, jellyfish, and cuttlefish, vegetables, such as thinly sliced cucumber, carrot, and tomato, as well as hard-boiled egg.

== See also ==
- Hiyashi chūka
