= Cheongyang chili pepper =

Type of chili pepper

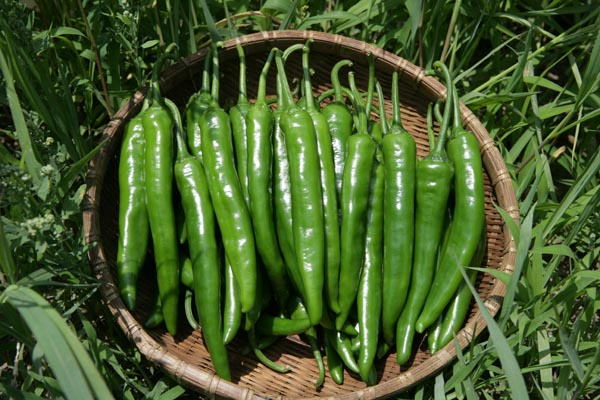
- Unripe Cheongyang chili peppers in a basket
- Species: Capsicum annuum
- Cultivar: Che-ong-yang
- Origin: South Korea
- Heat: Hot
- Scoville scale: 10,000 SHU

Korean name
- Hangul: 청양고추
- Hanja: 靑陽고추
- RR: cheongyanggochu
- MR: ch'ŏngyanggoch'u
- IPA: [tɕʰʌŋ.jaŋ.ɡo.tɕʰu]

The Cheongyang chili pepper (Korean: 청양고추) is a medium-sized chili cultivar of the species Capsicum annuum, with intensity of 10,000 Scoville heat units. Cheongyang chili peppers look similar to regular Korean chili peppers, but are many times spicier.

It was named after Cheongsong and Yeongyang Counties when developed by Yoo Il-Woong, by hybridizing local Jeju Province chili with Thai chili. The fruits can be light purple or green when unripe, and darken to a deep red as they ripen. The peppers retain their dark red color when dried. The rights of the pepper were later sold to Monsanto.
