= Japanese Chinese cuisine =

Japanese reinterpretation of Chinese culinary traditions

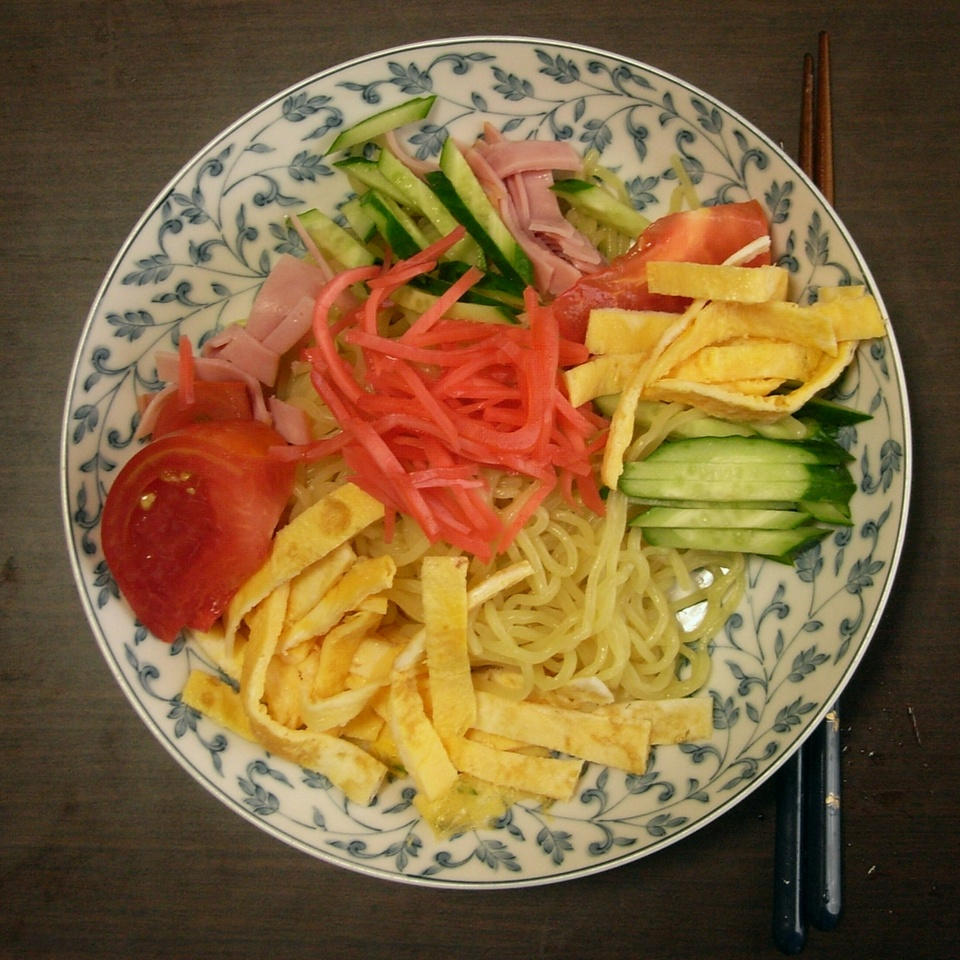
Hiyashi chuka

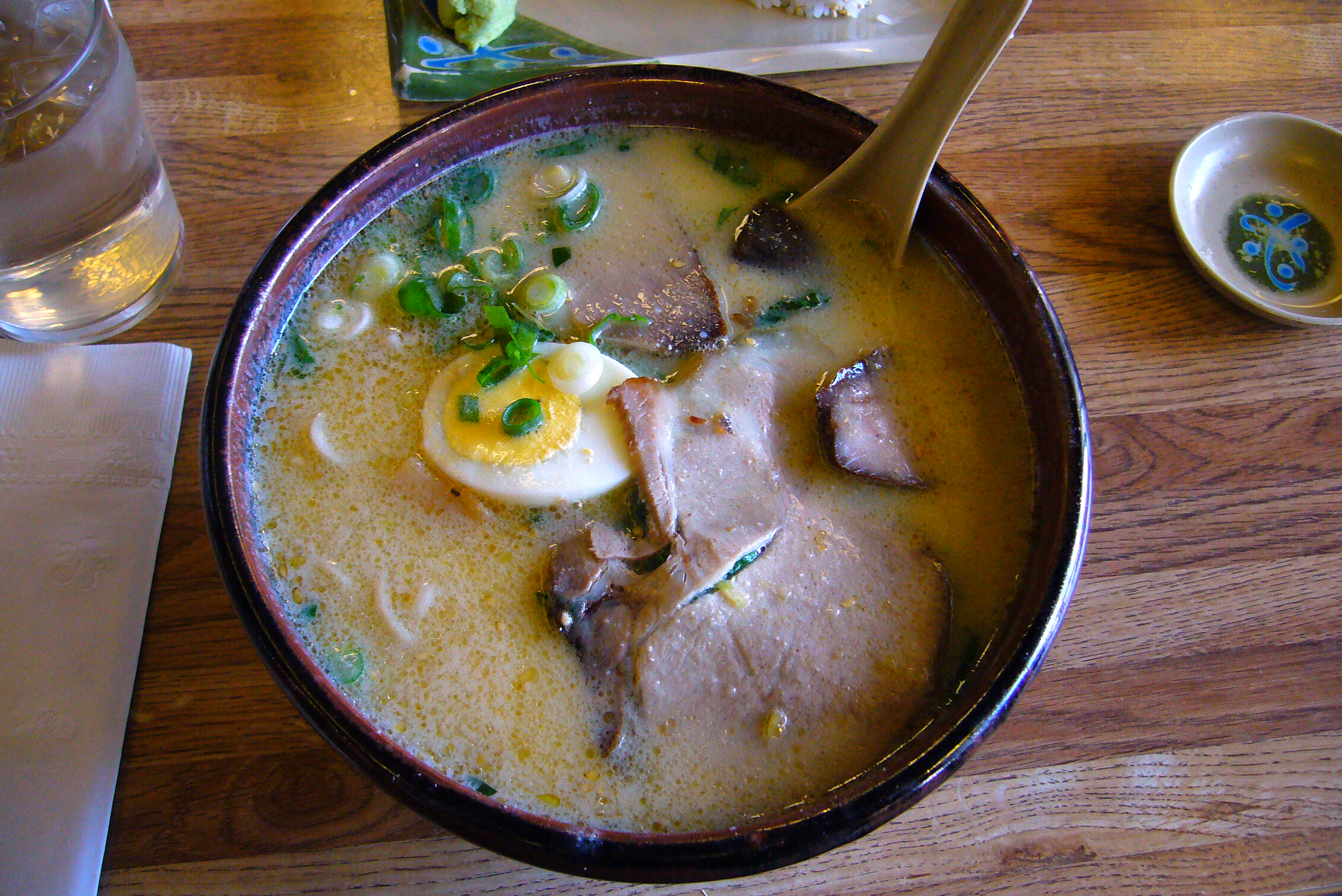
Miso-flavored ramen

Japanese Chinese cuisine, known as chūka ryōri (中華料理; literally "Chinese food") or simply chūka, refers to Japanese-style Chinese dishes and the restaurants in Japan that serve them. It represents a unique fusion of Japanese and Chinese culinary traditions that have evolved since the late 19th century. This style of food is considered distinct from the "authentic Chinese food" available in Japan, though it retains strong influences from various Chinese regional cuisines, and there is considerable overlap between the two.

A significant number of these dishes were introduced to Japan either by Chinese immigrants or Japanese colonizers returning from the Second Sino-Japanese war in China. This style of cuisine has found its expression in three main types of restaurants: ramen restaurants, dim sum houses, and standard Chinese-style restaurants. Most Japanese Chinese dishes have roots in Cantonese cuisine. Adaptations of Sichuanese cuisine were first introduced to Japan by celebrity chef Chen Kenmin.

The shippoku culinary style of Nagasaki is heavily influenced by Chinese cuisine, but it is not classified as Japanese Chinese cuisine, as it originated in the 17th century, predating the development of modern Japanese Chinese cuisine.

== Chinese restaurants in Japan ==
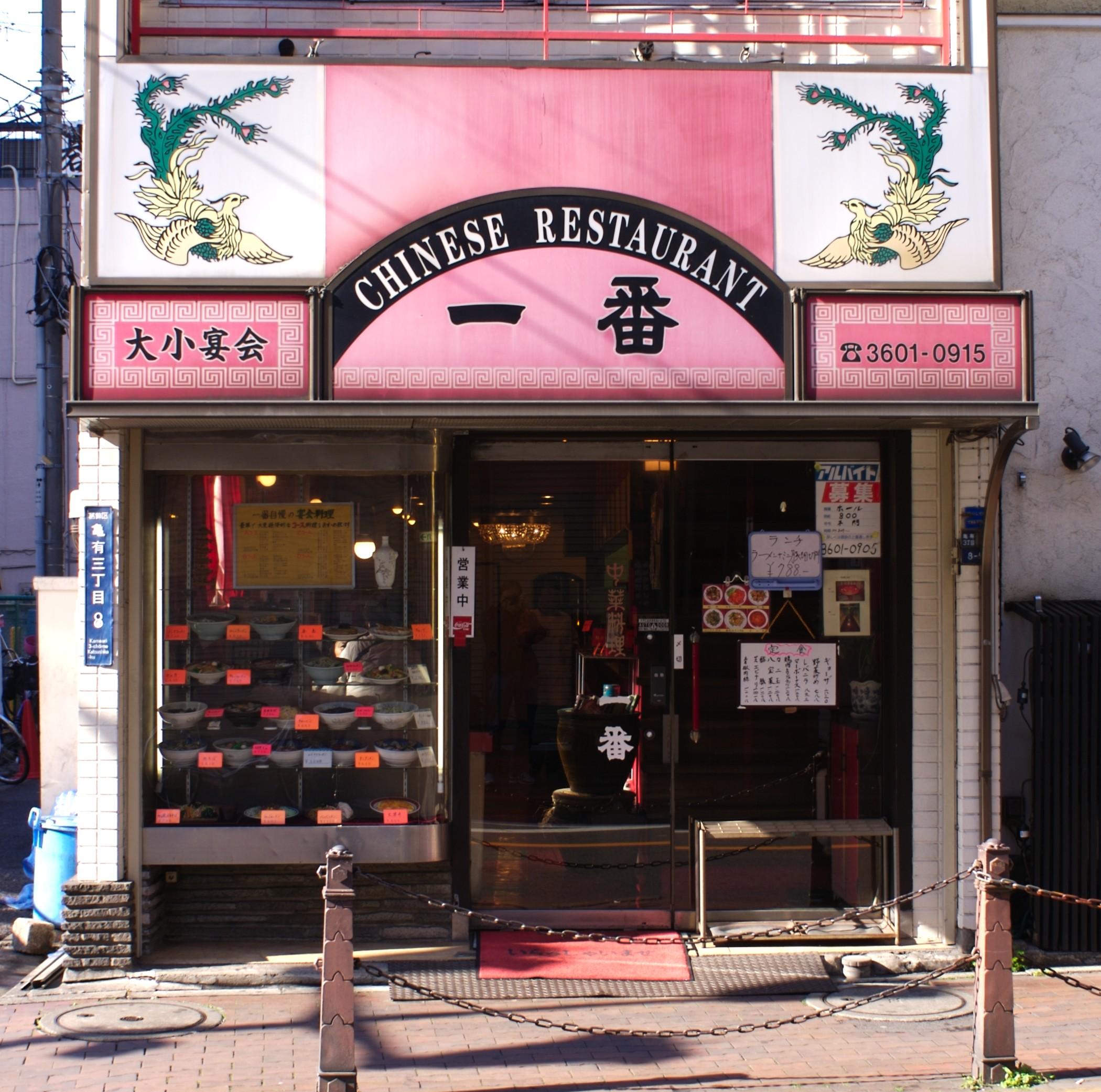
A Chinese restaurant in Katsushika, Tokyo

Chinese restaurants, known as chūka ryōriya (中華料理屋) or chūka hanten (中華飯店), serve a distinct set of popular dishes that are not necessarily typical of authentic Chinese cuisine. They also cater to Japanese tastes. Currently, most towns in Japan have at least one Chinese eatery, as the cuisine is very popular. There are also many packaged sauces available for Japanese people to cook Chinese dishes at home.

== Japanese Chinese dishes ==
General:

- Kara-age (唐揚, lit. Chinese fry) are bite-sized pieces of chicken thigh, dipped in a thick batter and fried. Usually, it is served without sauce. Some restaurants serve this with a salt and pepper mixture on the side for dipping, and some recipes call for a mixture of soy sauce, vinegar and scallions similar to that used on dumplings.
- Chūkaman (中華まん, lit. Chinese-style steamed bun) or nikuman (肉まん) is the Japanese name for Chinese baozi, steamed buns filled with cooked ground pork, beef, or other ingredients.
- Chāhan (炒飯 or チャーハン) is sometimes called "yakimeshi", literally meaning fried rice. It uses Japanese short-grain rice, which generally has a stickier consistency than that used in other countries. Additionally, though there are many different recipes using such diverse ingredients as Welsh onion, ground pork, crab, and bamboo shoots, the classic Japanese fried rice does not use soy sauce, remaining white when served. It typically uses egg, green peas, and thinly sliced ham.

Dishes derived from Sichuan cuisine:

- Mābō-dōfu (麻婆豆腐) are stir-fried dishes of ground pork mixture with tofu cubes (mābō-dōfu) in a slightly spicy sauce.
- Mābō-nasu (麻婆茄子) are stir-fried dishes of ground pork with eggplant (mābō-chezu) in a slightly spicy sauce. The dish was popularized in Japan by Chen Kenmin in 1952.
- Ebi no chili sauce (えびのチリソース) is a spicy, thick-sauced shrimp dish. As the name suggests, chili sauce is used.
- Hoi kō rō (回鍋肉) is a stir-fry of thinly sliced pork and cabbage in a miso-based sauce and pinch of chilli.
- Banbanji (棒棒鶏) is a cold dish of steamed chicken which is shredded and covered in a sesame sauce. It is often accompanied by cold vegetables such as carrot and cucumber as a salad or appetizer.

Dishes derived from Fujian cuisine:

- Champon (ちゃんぽん) is a ramen-like dish, topped with fried pork, seafood, and vegetables.
- Chin-jao rōsu (青椒肉絲; also called pepper steak) is a stir-fry of thinly sliced beef strips with Japanese green peppers and often bean sprouts in an oyster sauce.

Dishes derived from Cantonese cuisine:

- Ramen (拉麺, ラーメン or らあめん) is a dish of noodles in broth, usually with meat and vegetable toppings, is occasionally referred to as chuka soba (中華そば, lit. "Chinese noodles.") In Japan, ramen is one of the most popular fast-food options. Though every Japanese city has numerous inexpensive ramen restaurants specializing in these noodles, numerous varieties of instant ramen are available. The ramen primarily derives from the noodle soups in Cantonese cuisine, but these noodles have changed much since their origin in China.
- Chāshū (チャーシュー) is derived from char siu (叉燒 barbecued pork tenderloin). However, while the original Cantonese version is roasted after marinating in a sweet sauce that gives it a red colour, the Japanese version is instead red cooked. The switch from roasting the pork to red cooking it is potentially a Shanghainese influence.
- Yūrinchi (油淋鶏, lit. "oil-drenched chicken") is deep-fried chicken or karaage topped with a vinegar and soy sauce-based sweet-and-sour sauce and chopped scallions, often served on a bed of shredded lettuce.
- Subuta (酢豚) is the Japanese take on sweet and sour pork. It usually has a thicker, amber-colored sauce, unlike the striking orange or red of the Americanized version. Also unlike the American version, it does not typically contain pineapple. Another common dish substitutes the fried pork in this dish with small fried meat-balls, called "niku-dango". Chicken is sometimes used as a substitute to pork for this dish.
- Harumaki (春巻き, lit. "Spring Rolls") are very similar to those found in Americanized Chinese restaurants, with a thin wrapper and vegetables inside.
- Shumai (焼売 or シュウマイ) is a type of traditional Chinese dumpling made with pork or glutinous rice.
- Chūkadon (中華丼) is a Cantonese-style stir fry of vegetables and meat on top of rice.
- Kani-tama (かに玉 or 蟹玉) a Japanese adaptation of the Cantonese dish foo yung hai (芙蓉蟹). It is a crab meat omelette served with a thick, brownish sauce. Tenshindon (天津丼), also known as Tenshinhan (天津飯), is a dish of crab meat omelette (Kani-tama) served over rice. The dish name derived from the port city of Tianjin in China but it does not originate from there.

Dishes derived from Northeast Chinese cuisine:

- Gyōza (餃子 or ギョーザ), as mentioned before, are a very popular dish in Japan. Most often, they are seen in their pan-fried form, but they can be served boiled as dumplings or even deep fried, as well. They are also commonly found in ramen shops as well as general Chuka restaurants.
- Jingisukan (ジンギスカン) is a mutton dish prepared on a grill.
- Morioka jajamen (盛岡じゃじゃ麺) is based on zhajiangmian. Takashina Kanshou, a Japanese colonizer in Manchukuo, encountered zhajiangmian during his time there. After repatriating to Japan following World War II, he introduced the dish in Morioka, where it developed into the local variation known as jajamen.

Dishes derived from Jiangsu cuisine:

- Shoronpo is the Japanese pronunciation of xiaolongbao (小籠包), a steamed juicy pork dumpling (also called a "soup dumpling"), popularized in Shanghai.
- Hiyashi chūka (冷やし中華) is an adaptation of the liangbanmian from Shanghai.

Dishes derived from Zhejiang cuisine:

- Buta no Kakuni (豚の角煮) is thick slices of pork bellies stewed in a soy sauce based mixture, often served with Shanghai bok choy and Chinese mustard.

== See also ==
- Korean Chinese cuisine
- Chinese people in Japan
