= Korean chili pepper =

Type of chili pepper

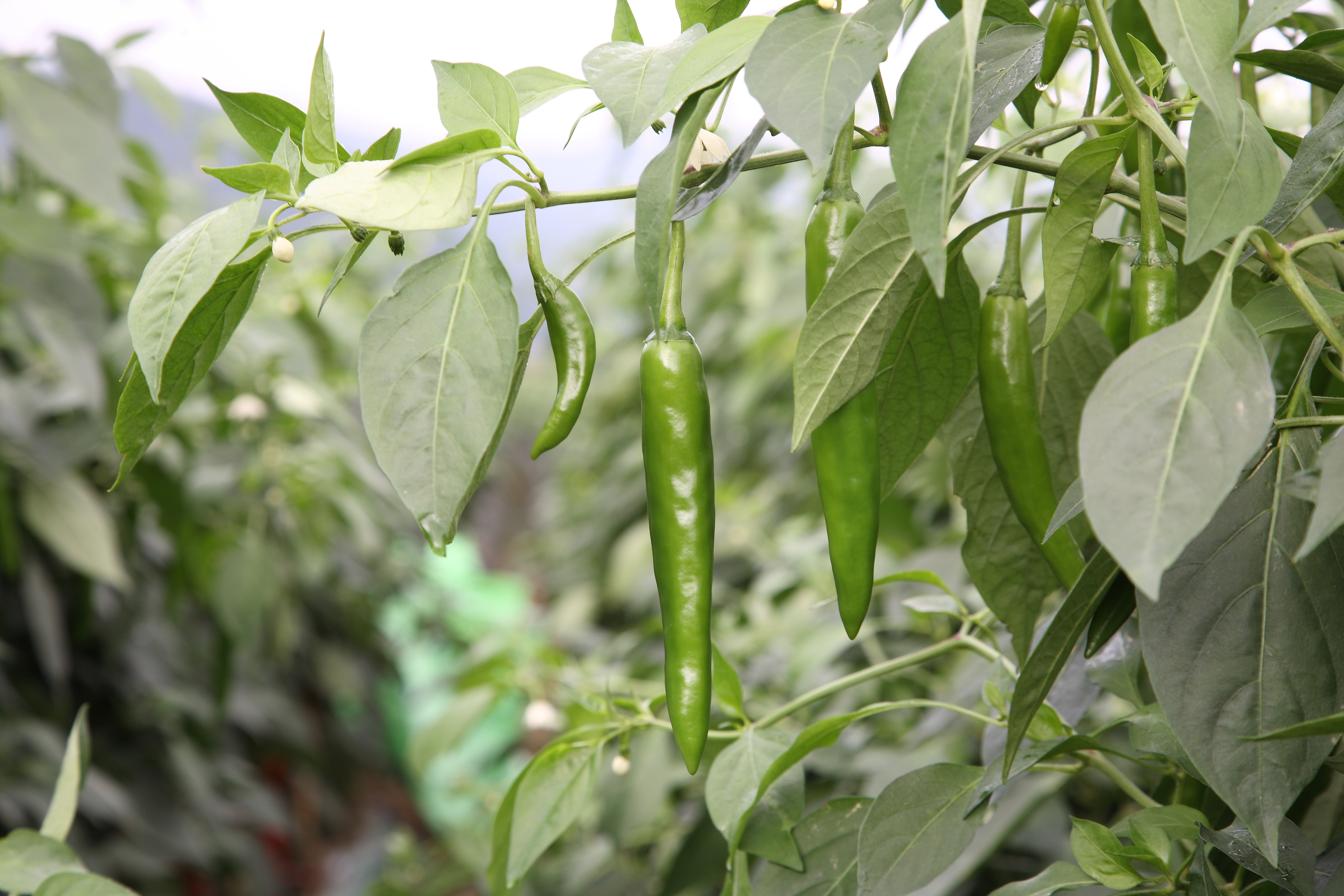
- Green chili peppers
- Species: Capsicum annuum
- Origin: Korea
- Heat: Low
- Scoville scale: 1,500 SHU

Korean chili peppers or Korean hot peppers, also known as Korean red, Korean dark green, or Korean long green peppers according to color (ripening stages), are medium-sized chili peppers of the species Capsicum annuum. The chili pepper is long, slender and mild in flavor and spice. Green (unripe) chili peppers measure around 1,500 Scoville heat units.

Gochugaru or Korean chili powder, is chili powder or flakes made from these peppers.

== Names ==
In Korean, the chili peppers are most often called gochu (고추), which means "chili pepper". Green ones are called putgochu (풋고추), and red ones are called honggochu (홍고추).

== Introduction to Korea ==
Chili peppers, which originated in the Americas, were introduced by Portuguese traders to Korea, via Japan, in the late 16th century. There is mention of chili pepper or mustard in Korea traced to Japan found in Collected Essays of Jibong, an encyclopedia published in 1614. Farm Management, a book from around 1700, discussed the cultivation methods of chili peppers.

== Culinary use ==
- Korean chili pepper
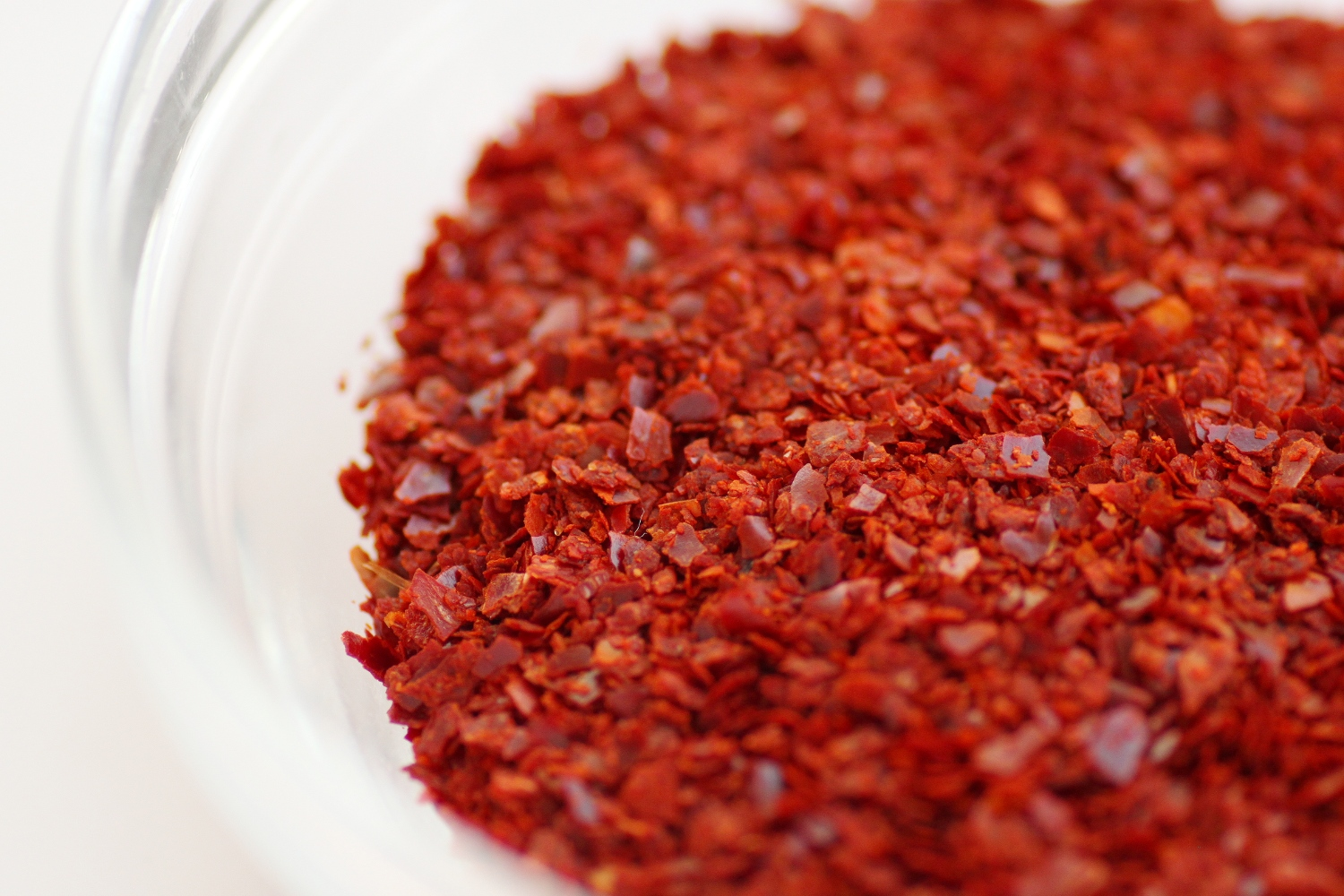
- Gochugaru (chili powder)

Korean name
- Hangul: 고춧가루
- RR: gochutgaru
- MR: koch'ukkaru

Gochugaru, also known as Korean chili powder, is dried chili powder or flakes used in Korean cuisine. The name gochugaru is derived from Korean gochutgaru 고춧가루, from gochu (고추) 'chili pepper' and garu (가루) 'powder'. In English, gochugaru usually refers to the seedless, Korean variety of chili powder. It has a vibrant red color, the texture may vary from fine powder to flakes, and the heat level from mildly hot to very hot. Traditionally made from sun-dried Korean red chili peppers (태양초; taeyangcho), gochugaru has a complex flavor profile with spicy, sweet, and slightly smoky tastes. Gochugaru made from Cheongyang chili pepper is finer and hotter.

== In Korean folk culture ==
The use of red gochu pepper to ward off misfortune has been a shamanistic folk practice used in many aspects of Korean life.

From the National Folk Museum of Korea:

Gochu, or red pepper, is used to cleanse impurities and to chase away evil spirits in the event of an illness or the birth of a son.

The pepper's red color was believed to symbolize the sun and its spicy flavor to be effective for chasing away bad forces, while its shape was associated with the birth of a male infant.

The practice of attaching red peppers to the taboo rope (geumjul) hung over the gate to announce the birth of a son is observed around the country.

Upon the outbreak of a contagious disease, three red peppers are hung over the gate of a home along with the fastening ribbons from a shirt that belongs to a patient, while in some other regions, ten peppers are strung together with thread and hung near the gate.

In some regions, if no smell was produced after burning peppers, it was believed that the disease had been caused by a spirit angered by the breaking of a taboo, and a shamanic ritual or a village ritual was held.

In fishing villages, boat rituals (baegosa) and cleansing rituals include the sprinkling of red pepper powder, or soaking of red peppers or wood charcoal (sut) in jeonghwasu (fresh water fetched from well).

A taboo rope with red peppers was also hung over the gate when new sauce or paste was being made inside the home.

== Gallery ==
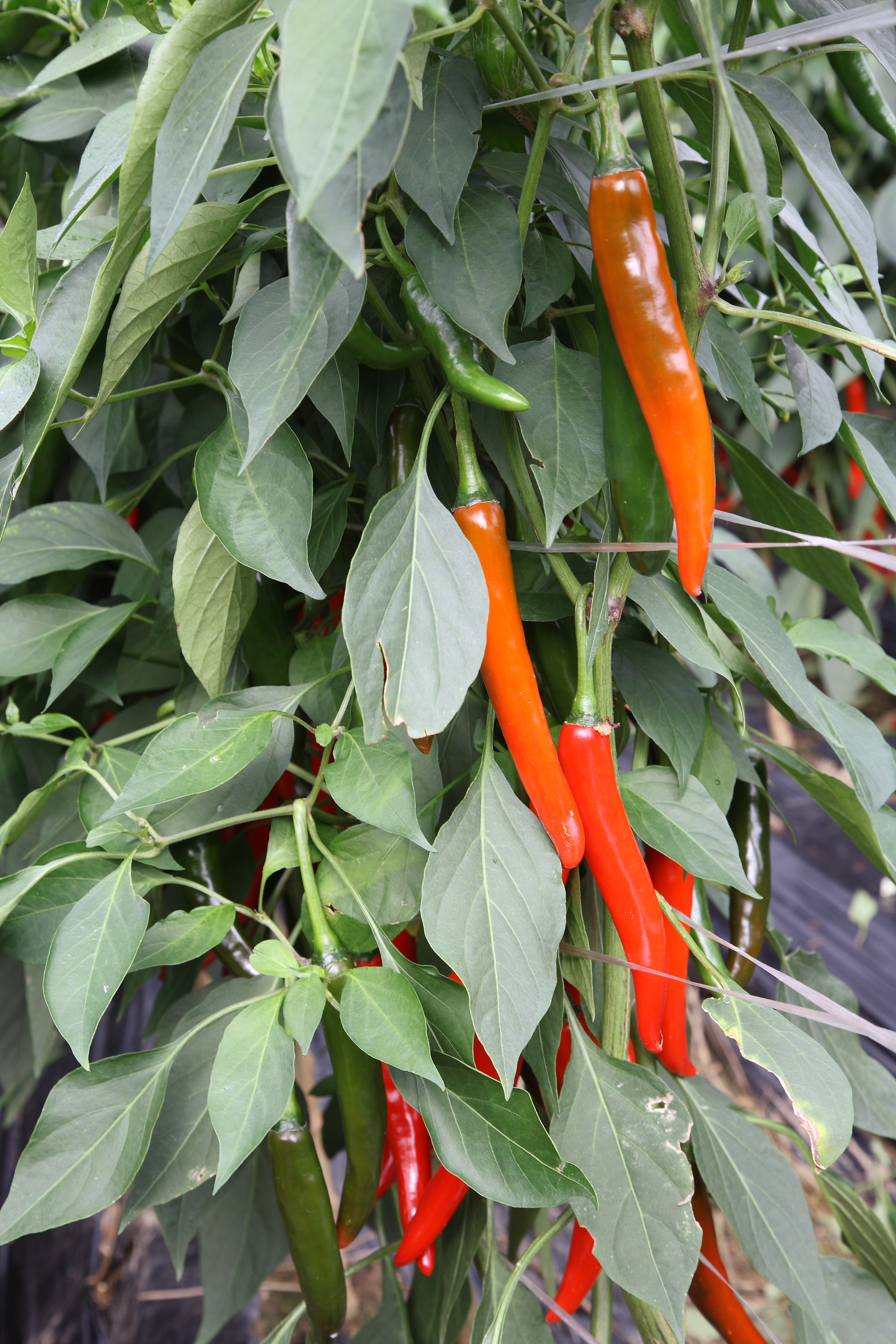
Red (ripe) chili peppers

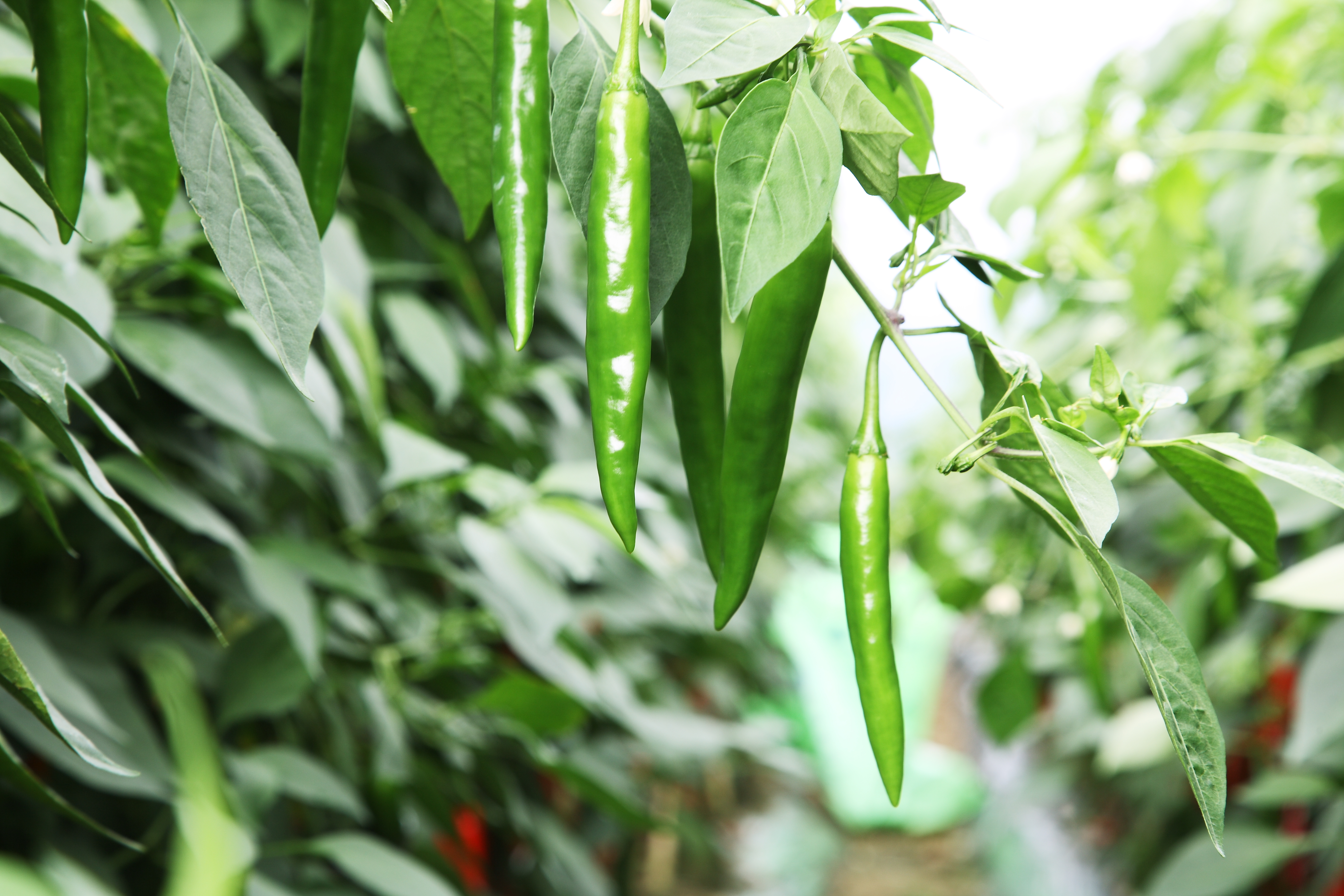
Green (unripe) chili peppers

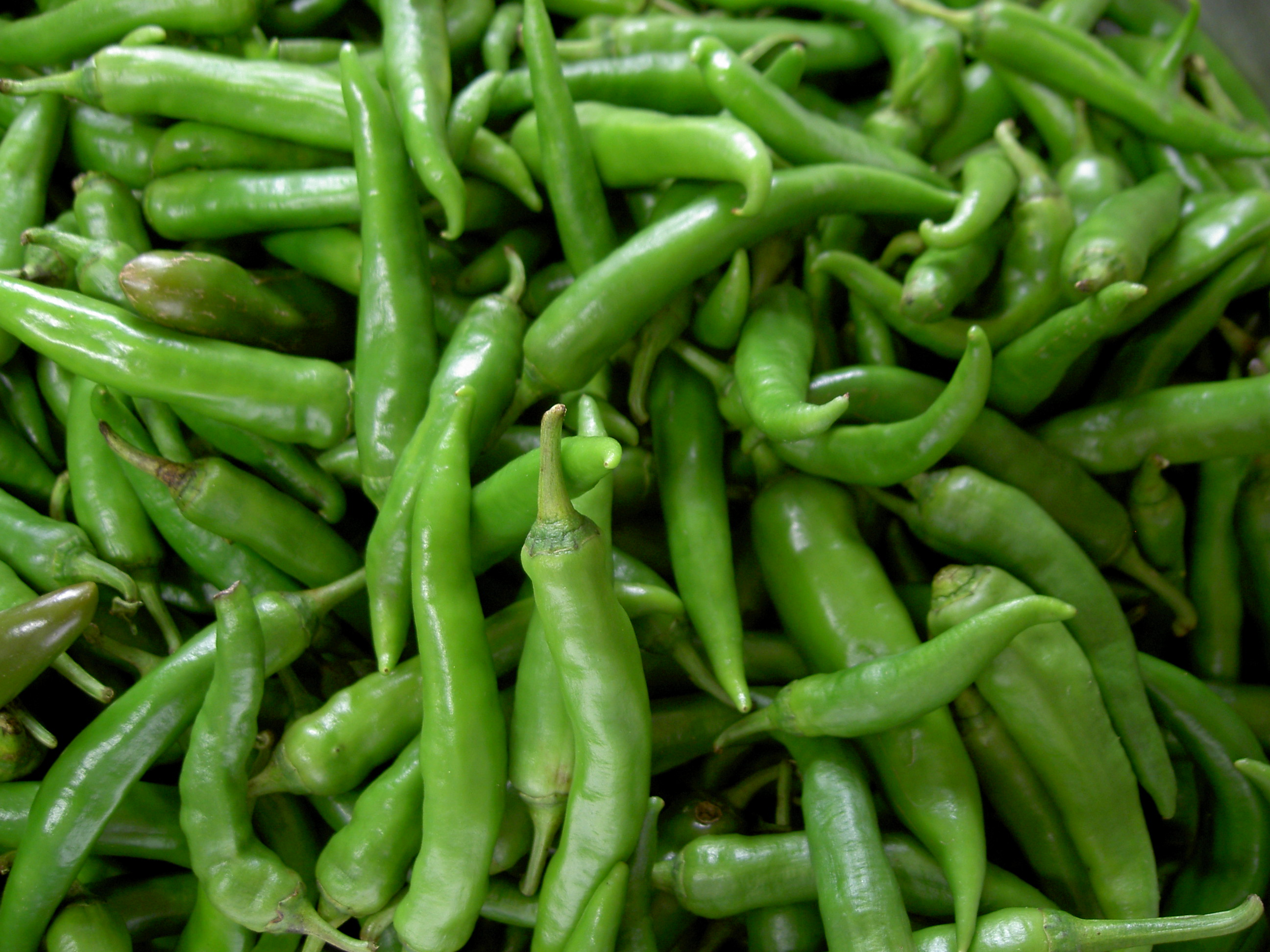
Harvested green chili peppers

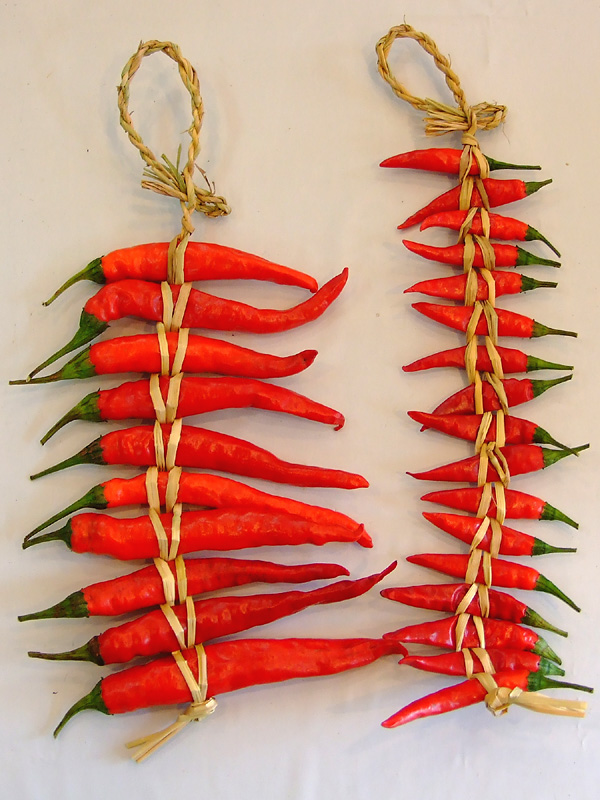
Red chili peppers tied with saekki (straw ropes)

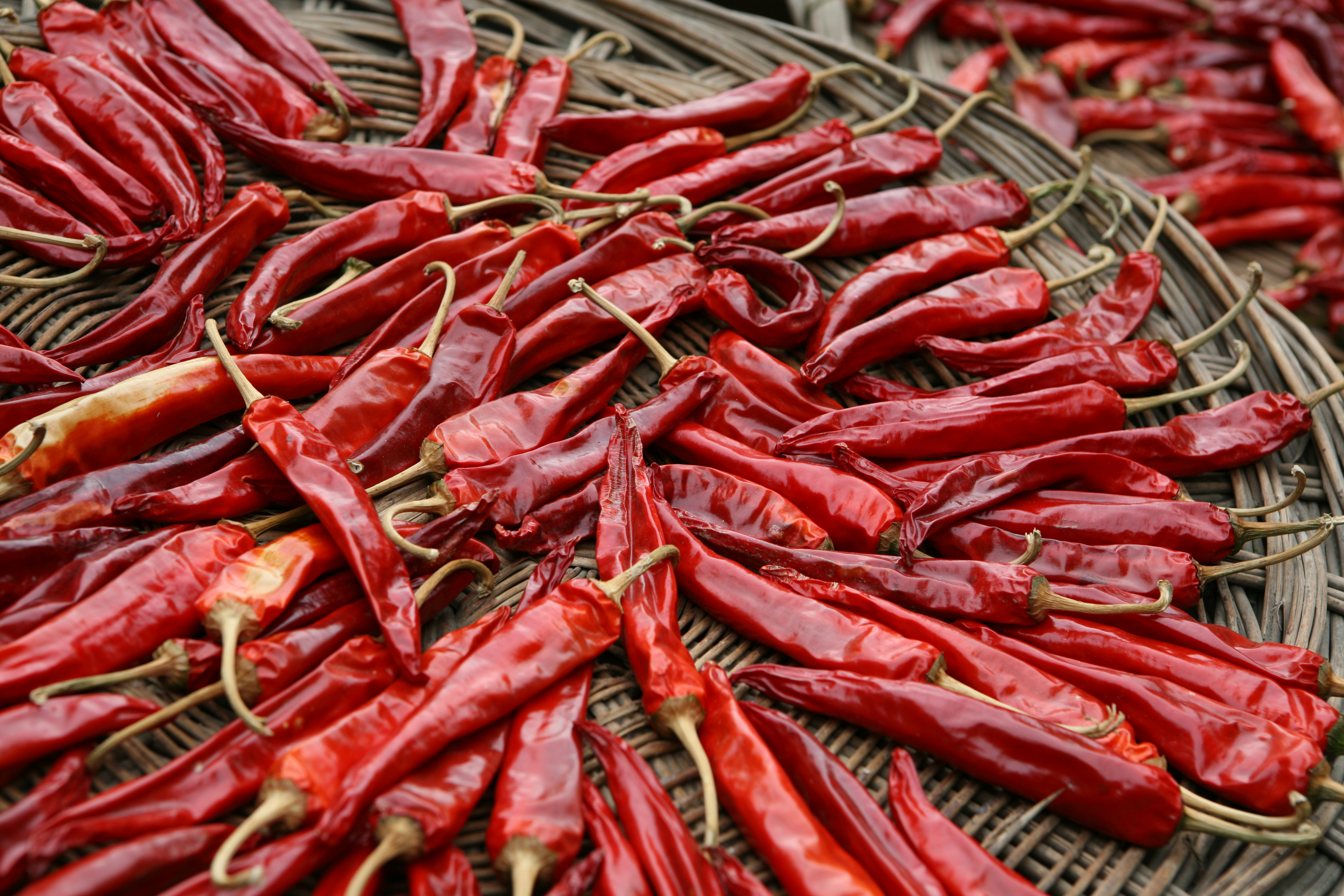
Dried red chili peppers

== See also ==
- Cheongyang chili pepper
- Paprika
