= Diāng-biĕng-gù =

Flat rice noodle dish in Fuzhou cuisine

Diāng-biĕng-gù (simplified Chinese: 鼎边糊; traditional Chinese: 鼎邊糊; lit. 'pot side paste', Foochow Romanized: diāng-biĕng-gù), also known as guo bian hu (simplified Chinese: 锅边糊; traditional Chinese: 鍋邊糊; pinyin: guō biān hú; lit. 'wok side paste') and ding bian cuo (simplified Chinese: 鼎边锉; traditional Chinese: 鼎邊銼; pinyin: dǐng biān cuò; lit. 'pot side scraping'), is a characteristic dish of Fuzhou cuisine, a branch of Fujian cuisine, consisting of a rice flour batter poured around the side of cooking wok to form a thin noodle, then scraped into a stock to simmer and served in broth. Other ingredients to flavour the stock are often served in the broth; commonly included is a form of seafood, some meat (such as meatballs, usually pork) and various vegetables.

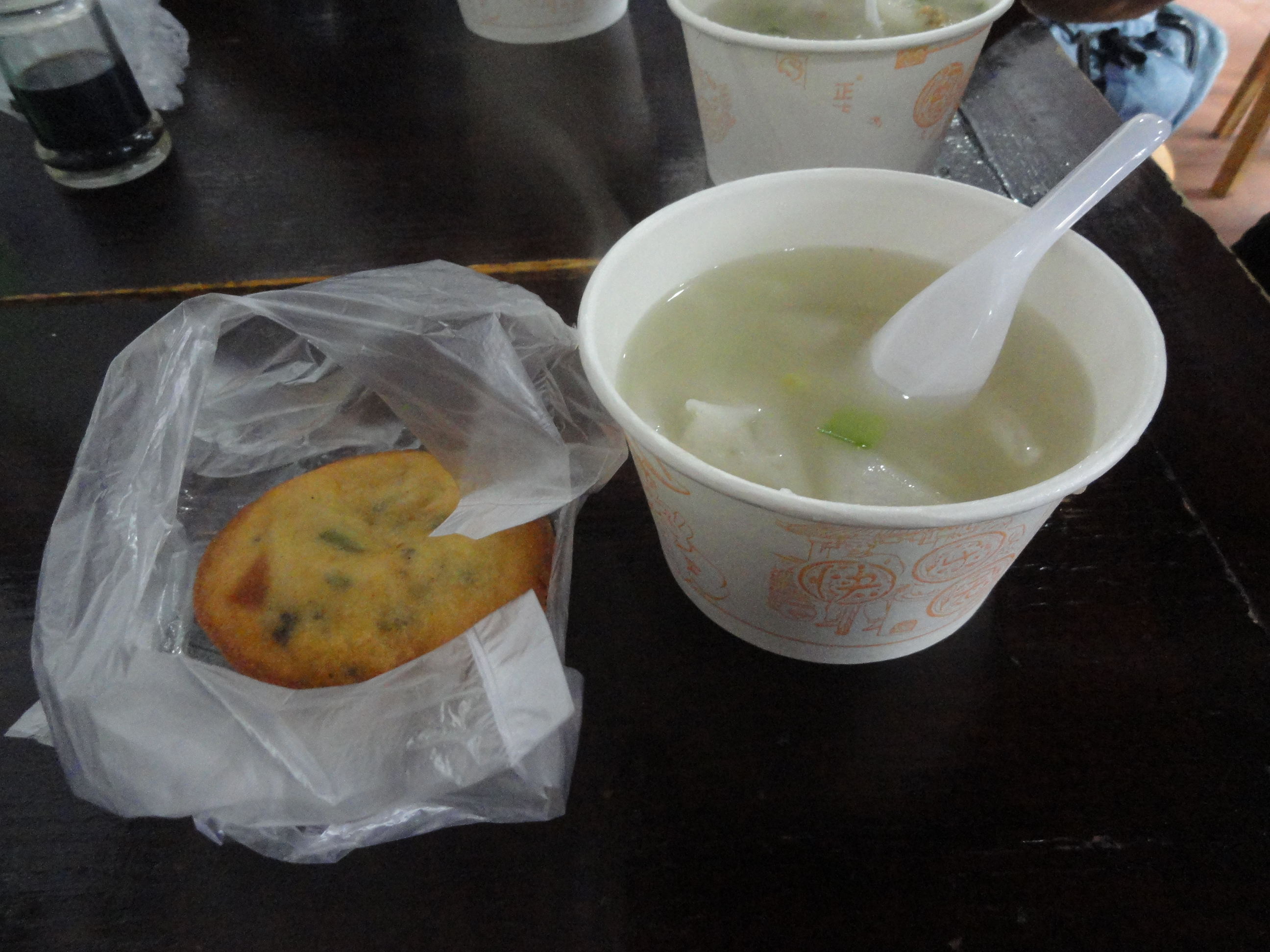
Diāng-biĕng-gù or guō biān hú (right) alongside Shaxian youbing (left) in Sanfang Qixiang, central Fuzhou.

Besides Fujian, it is also popular in Taiwan. In Taiwanese Hokkien, it is known as tiánn-pinn-sô (in the Taiwanese Romanization System; Chinese: 鐤邊趖), and has been served to foreign dignitaries at state banquets. During the Ming and Qing dynasties, diāng-biĕng-gù was introduced to Longyou and Jinhua in central Zhejiang by traders, called hu (Chinese: 糊) in Longyou and Fujian geng (Chinese: 福建羹) in Jinhua. However, the ingredients were changed due to the lack of access to seafood.
