= Fuzhou cuisine =

Regional cuisine of China

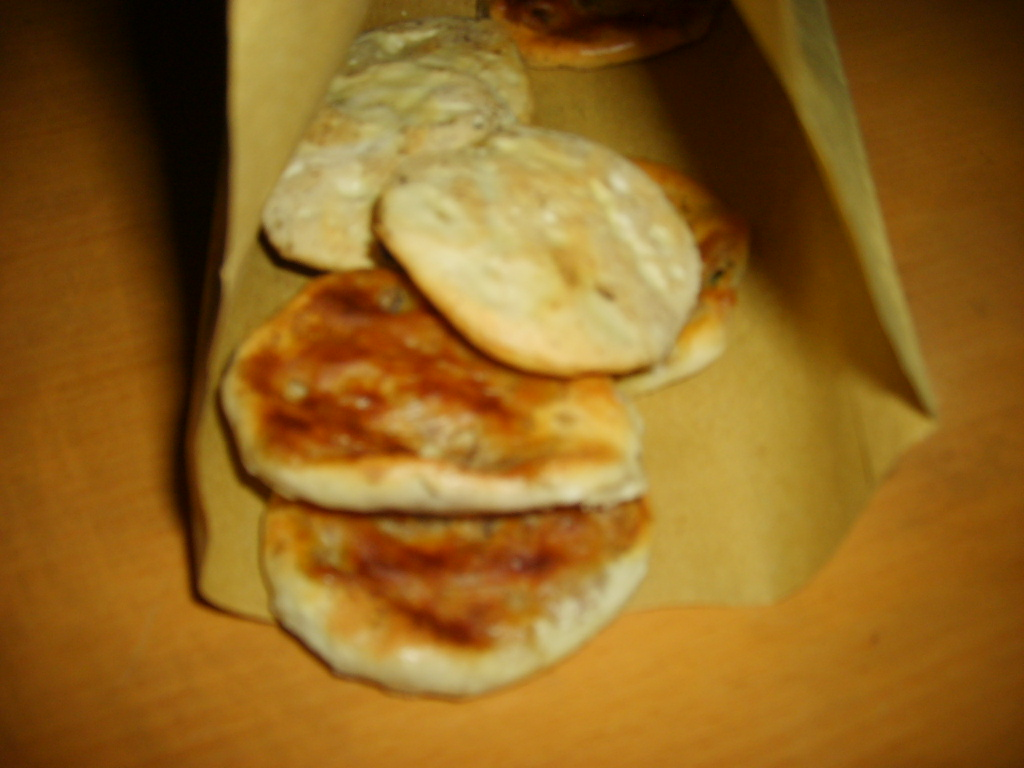
Kompyang

Fuzhou cuisine is one of the four subsets of Fujian cuisine, which is one of the Eight Great Traditions of Chinese cuisine. Fuzhou cuisine's taste is light compared to other styles, often with a mixed sweet and sour taste. Fuzhou cuisine displays an influence from the neighboring Zhejiang province's cuisine and as the capital of Fujian, Fuzhou has been more influenced by cuisines from Northern China but also have influences native to Fujian. It is traditionally considered the most prestigious subset of Fujian cuisine and was a strong influence on Ryukyuan cuisine in Japan.

== Notable dishes ==
- Ding bian hu (simplified Chinese: 鼎边糊; traditional Chinese: 鼎邊糊; pinyin: dǐngbiānhú; Foochow Romanized: diāng-biĕng-gù, also called in simplified Chinese: 锅边糊; traditional Chinese: 鍋邊糊; pinyin: guōbiānhú)
- Buddha jumps over the wall (simplified Chinese: 佛跳墙; traditional Chinese: 佛跳牆; pinyin: fótiàoqiáng)
- Fuzhou fish ball (simplified Chinese: 福州鱼丸; traditional Chinese: 福州魚丸; pinyin: Fúzhōu yúwán)
- Gua bao (Chinese: 刈包; pinyin: guàbāo, yìbāo)
- Kompyang (simplified Chinese: 光饼; traditional Chinese: 光餅; pinyin: guāngbǐng)
- Hujiao bing (simplified Chinese: 胡椒饼; traditional Chinese: 胡椒餅; pinyin: hújiāobǐng), a black pepper bun
- Lychee pork (Chinese: 荔枝肉; pinyin: lìzhī ròu)
- Rouyan (Chinese: 肉燕; pinyin: ròuyàn), a type of wonton made with yanpi
- Taro purée (Chinese: 芋泥; pinyin: yùní)
- Beef ball (Chinese: 牛滑; pinyin: ròuhuá)
