= Zhangcha duck =

Duck dish from Sichuan cuisine

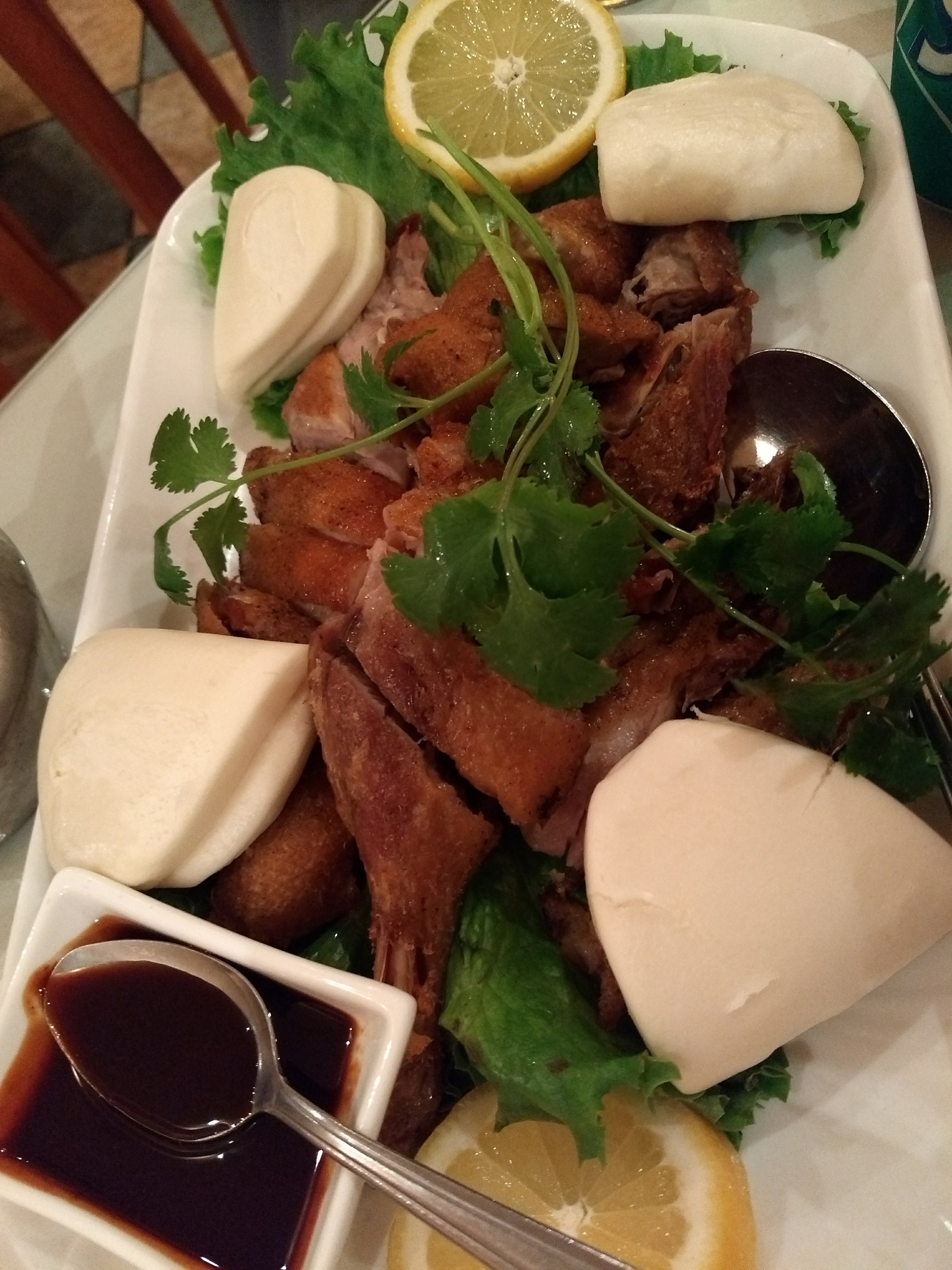
- Zhangcha tea smoked duck as prepared in the Dalian Restaurant in Berkeley
- Traditional Chinese: 樟茶鴨
- Simplified Chinese: 樟茶鸭
- Literal meaning: camphor tea duck
Transcriptions
Standard Mandarin
- Hanyu Pinyin: zhāngchá yā

Zhangcha duck, tea-smoked duck, or simply smoked duck (Chinese: 樟茶鸭; pinyin: zhāngchá yā; lit. 'camphor-tea duck') is a quintessential dish of Sichuan cuisine. It is prepared by hot smoking a marinated duck over tea leaves and camphor leaves. Due to its complicated preparation, Zhangcha duck was eaten more often at banquets or festive events than as a daily household dish.

== Preparation ==
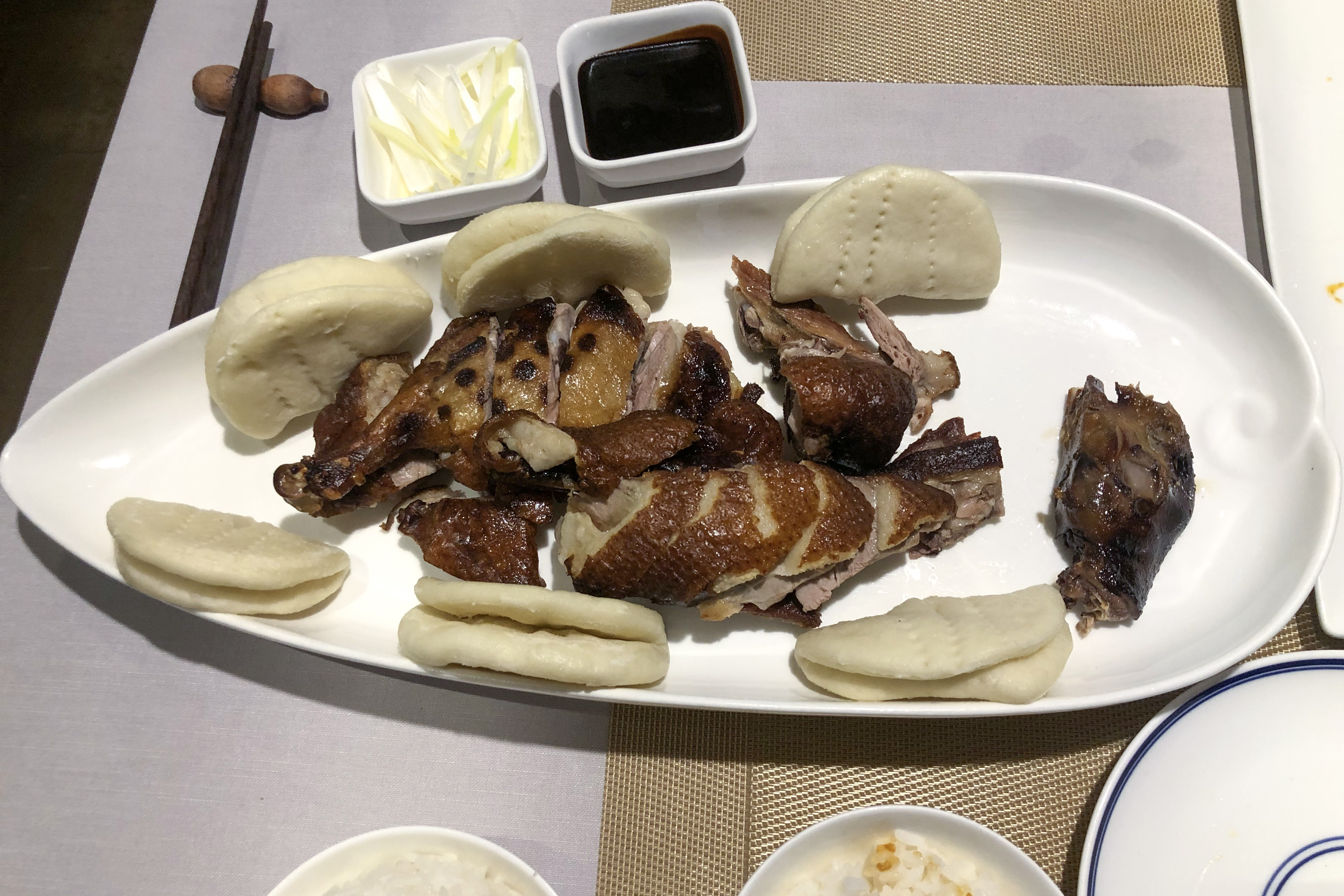
Zhangcha duck with lotus leaf bread

The duck is first marinated for several hours with a rub containing a typical combination of whole or crushed Sichuan pepper, huangjiu or baijiu (fermented or distilled Chinese wine), ginger, garlic, and salt, with much of it rubbed inside the cavity of the duck. For intensity of taste, sometimes the marinade rub is augmented with choujiu, black pepper, tea leaves, and camphor leaves. Following the marination, the duck is quickly blanched in hot water to tighten the skin, and then towel and air dried. This step ensures that the skin of the duck will not turn bitter during smoking. A wok is then prepared for smoking the duck with black tea leaves. Following a smoke treatment of approximately 10–15 minutes, the duck is then steamed for another 10 minutes before being deep fried in vegetable oil until its skin is crisp.

The duck is consumed wrapped in clam-shaped buns called gua bao.

== See also ==
- List of duck dishes
- List of smoked foods
