= Bianrouyan =

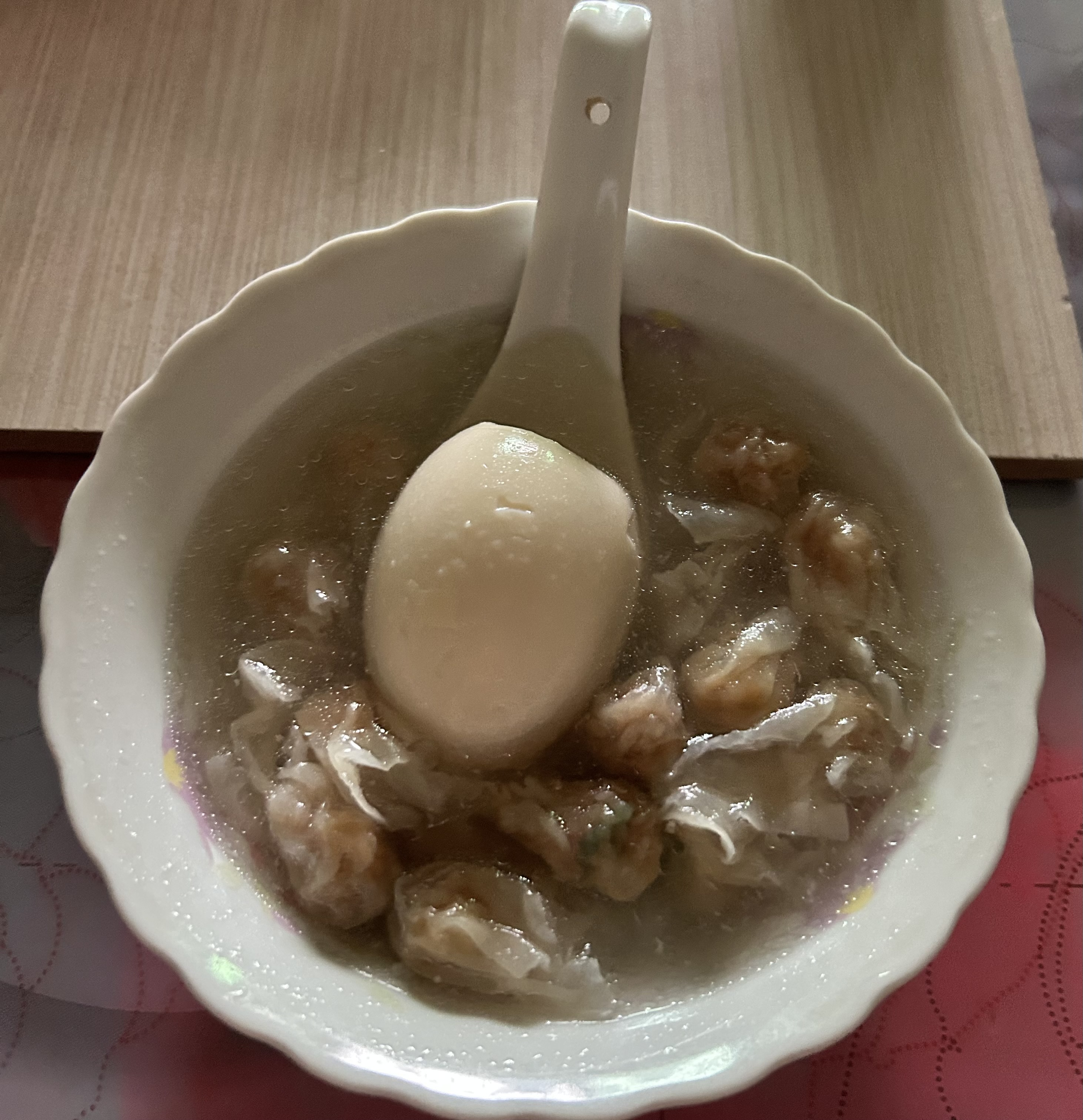
- Danyang rouyan in soup with duck egg
- Alternative names: Rouyan, Meat Swallow
- Place of origin: City of Fuzhou
- Invented: 1234

Bianrouyan (Min Dong Chinese: Biēng-nṳ̆k-iéng) or just Rouyan, is a local delicacy from Fuzhou, the name was inspired by the Swallow-like shape of the Rouyan. Compared to dumplings, wontons, it is quite small.

== RouYanPi (肉燕皮) ==
Rouyan wrappers (abbreviated as Yanpi) commonly known as wonton wrappers, are crafted from carefully selected lean meat from the fore and hind legs of pigs. Combined with starch, salt, and other ingredients, the mixture is pounded by hand to create a wrapper as thin as a sheet of paper, distinguished by its pure white color.

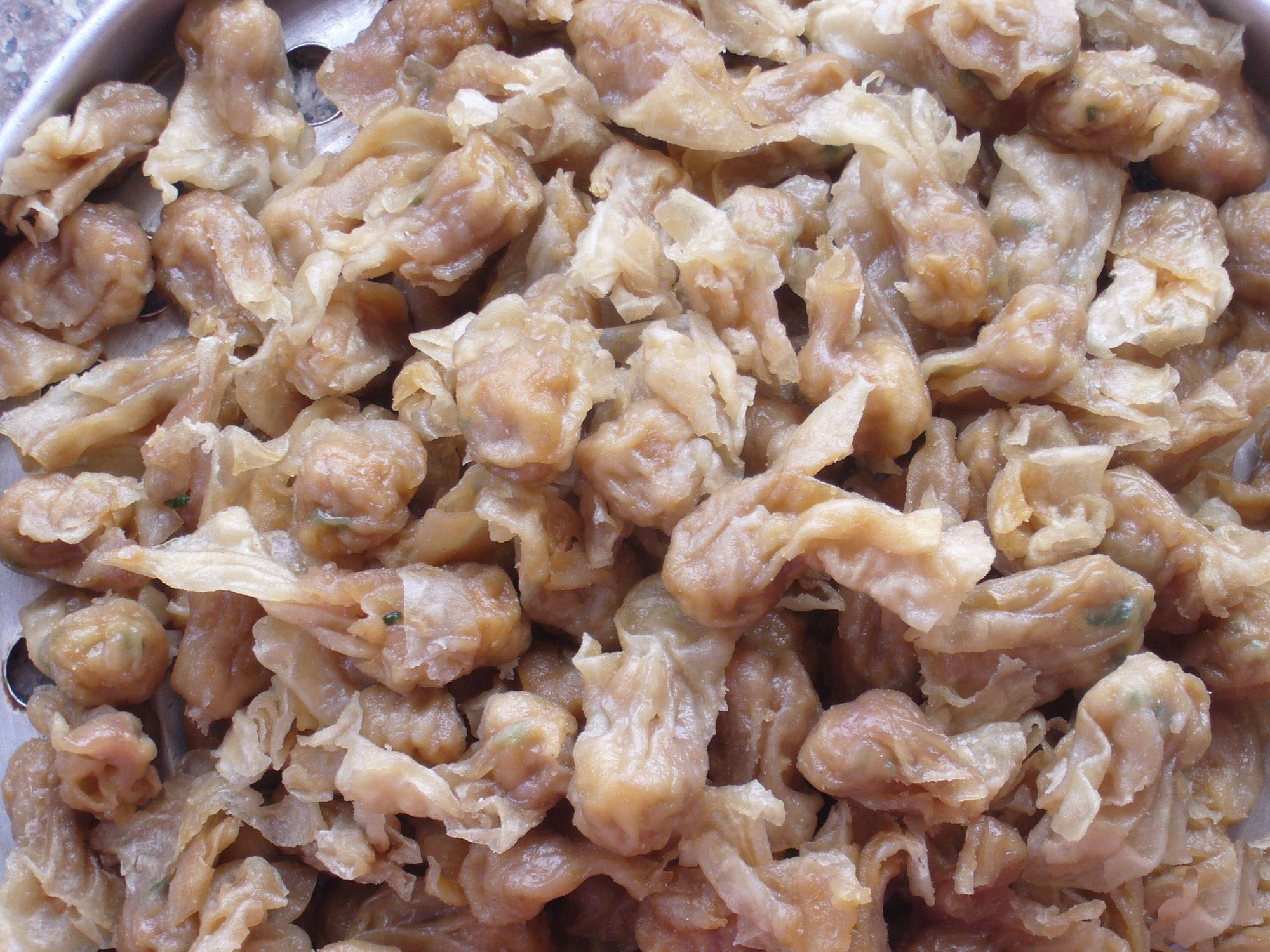
Rouyan from Danyang town, Lianjiang county, Fujian province, China

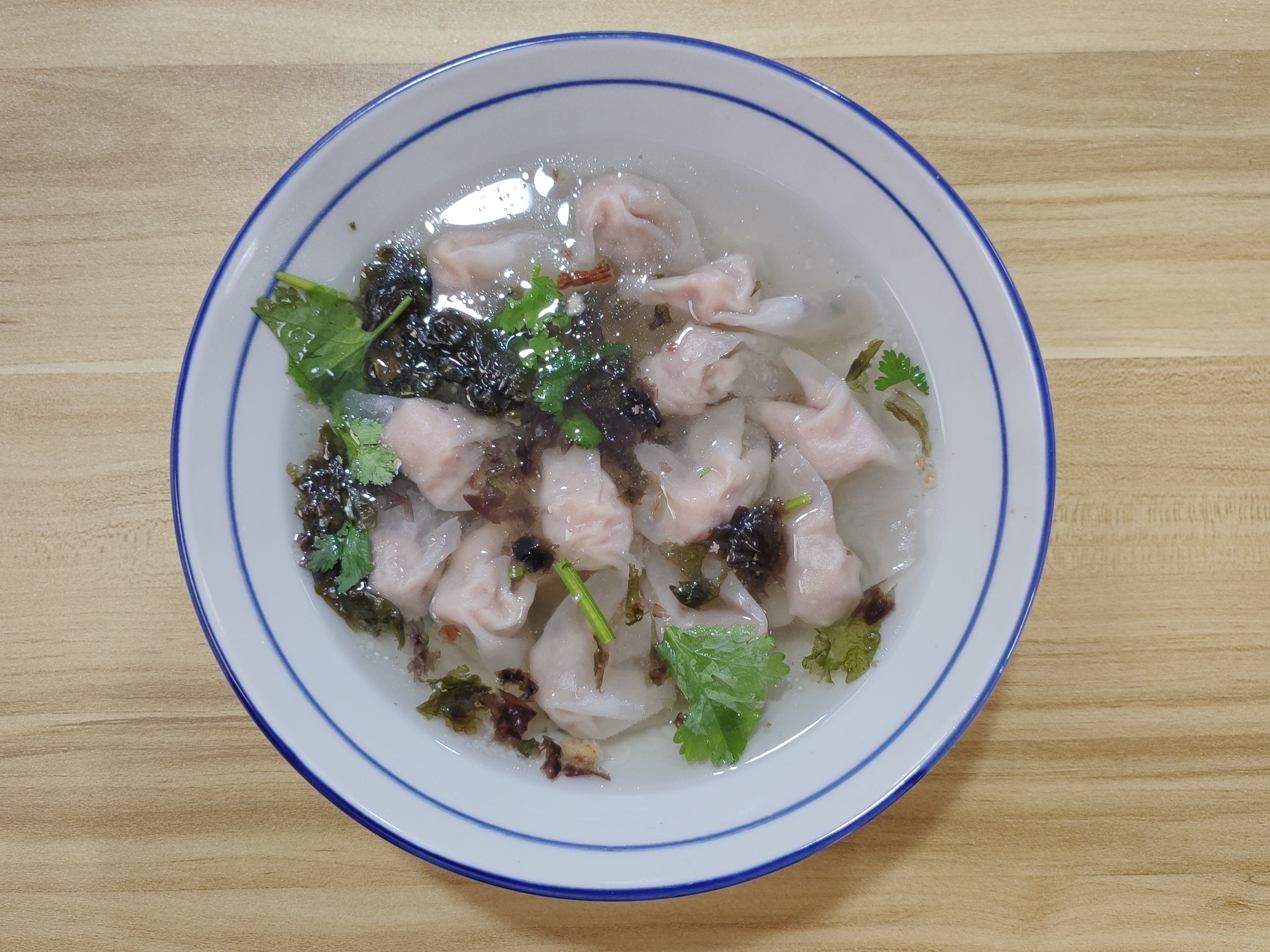
Rouyan in soup with dried seaweed and cilantro

Fuzhou yanpis were originally created by Wang Shitong (王世統). Wang Shitong—whose courtesy name was Qingshui (清水) and whose nickname was Quanju (全聚)—was a native of Fuzhou who began his career as a peddler trading in local specialty products. Later, while in Pucheng, he observed the immense popularity of yanpis; he learned the production techniques from local masters there before returning to Fuzhou during the Guangxu era of the Qing Dynasty.

== Origin ==
According to legend, as early as the Jiajing era of the Ming Dynasty, an Imperial Censor from Pucheng County, Fujian Province, retired from official service and returned to his hometown in the mountains. Living amidst the mountain ranges, he eventually grew weary of the local delicacies, finding them to have become rather monotonous.

Consequently, his family chef took lean pork from a pig's leg, pounded it into a fine paste with a wooden mallet, used an appropriate amount of sweet potato starch, rolled it to be paper-thin and cut into small, three-inch squares, then the wrappers were filled with minced meat to form bianshi (扁食/flat food/wonton), which were then boiled and served in a savory broth. After tasting them, the Imperial Censor found them to be very delicious; exclaiming "Simply marvelous!" then he asked the name of this delicacy. The chef—noting that the dumplings’ shape resembled a soaring swallow—spontaneously named them Bianrouyan ("Flat Meat Swallows").

Later, these dumplings were cooked with duck eggs; since the Fuzhou dialect pronunciation for "duck egg" (鸭卵/yaluan) is homophonous with the phrases yaluàn (压乱/suppressing chaos)—thereby symbolizing "peace and tranquility"—the dish subsequently acquired the alternative name Taipingyan (太平燕/Peace Swallows).
