= Yanpi =

Type of Chinese wonton skin

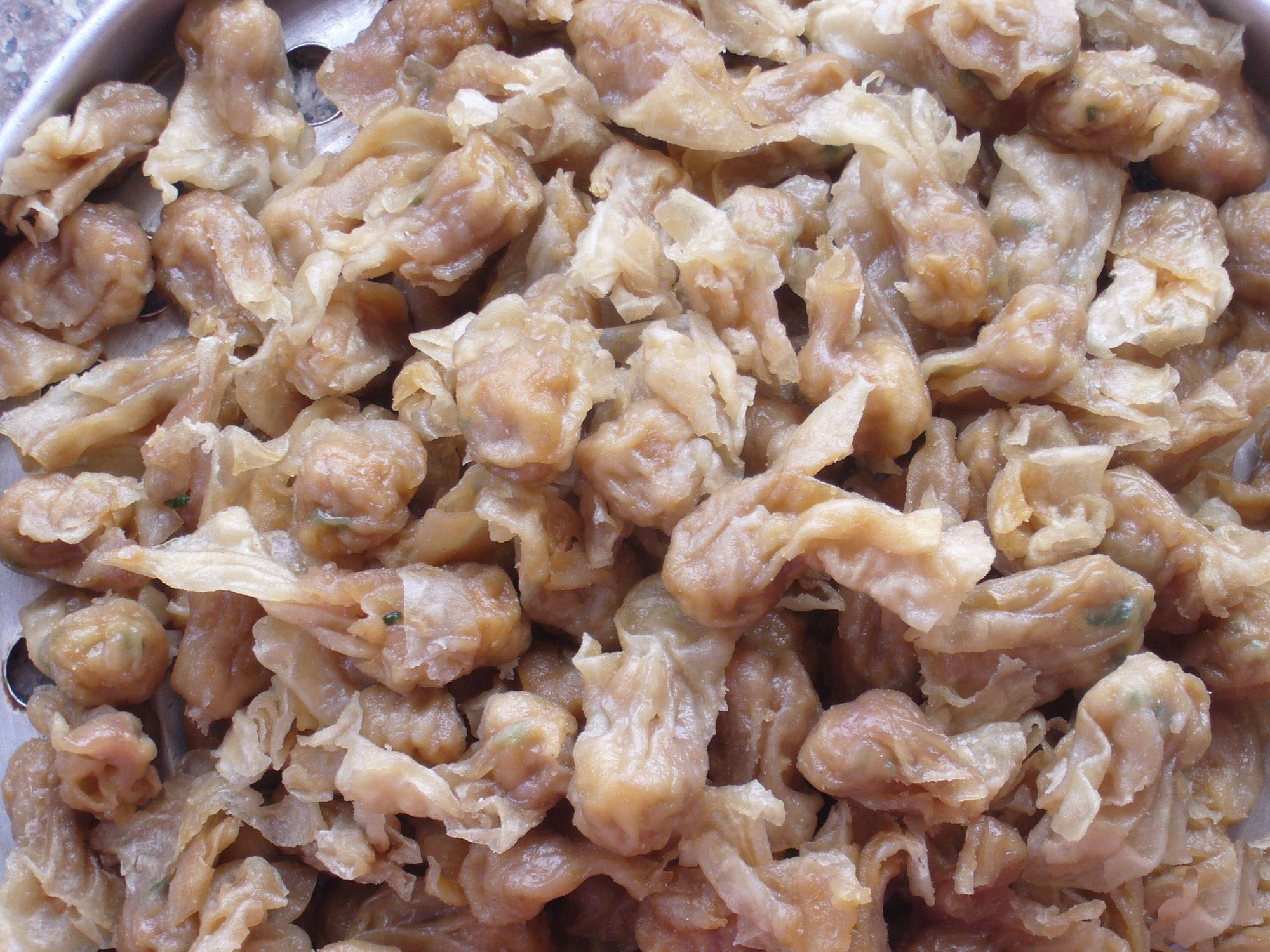
Rouyan made with yanpi wrappers

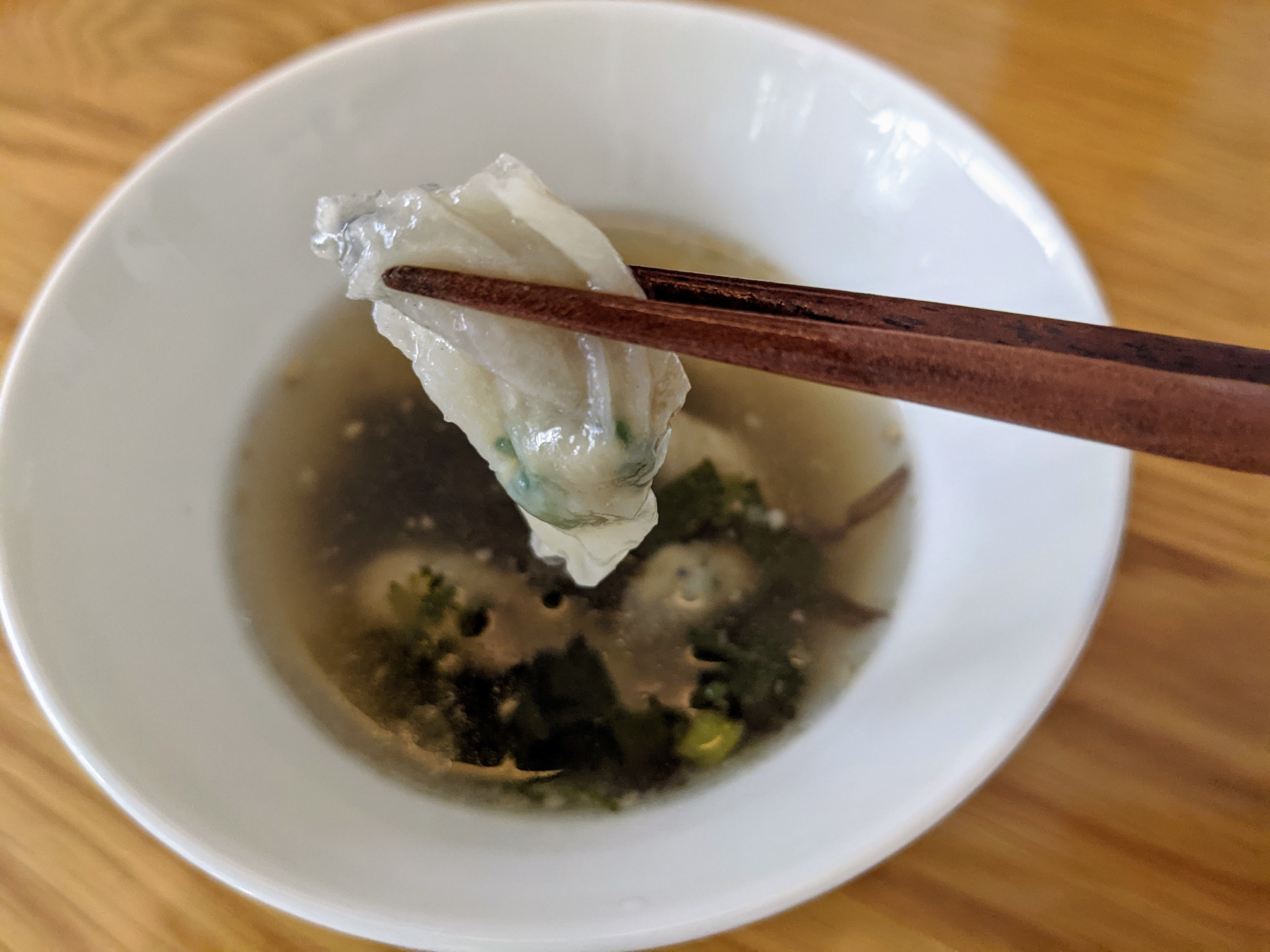
Putian-style bianrou soup

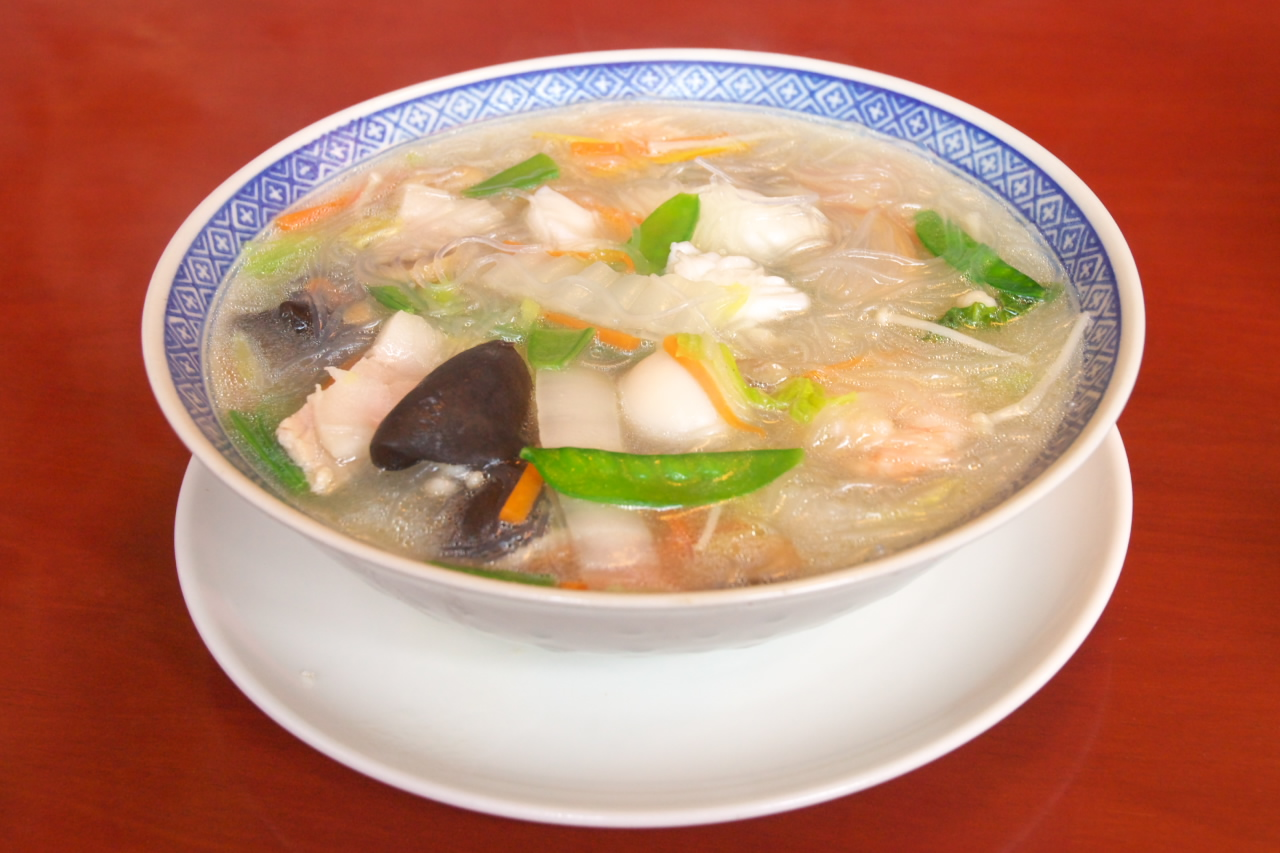
Taiping yan

Yanpi (Chinese: 燕皮; pinyin: yànpí; Pe̍h-ōe-jī: ian phî; lit. 'swallow skin') is a type of wonton skin used in Chinese cuisine. Lean pork meat taken from the shanks is mixed with glutinous rice, pounded to a paste, then sprinkled with starch. The meat gives yanpi a taste and texture similar to that of surimi.

The thin yanpi skins are used to wrap bianrouyan (Chinese: 扁肉燕; pinyin: biǎnròuyàn; Pe̍h-ōe-jī: píⁿ-bah-ian; lit. 'flat meat'; Hokchew Romanized: Biēng-nṳ̆k-iéng), a type of meat wonton which are often used in taiping yan, a soup eaten on special occasions in Fujian. Yanpi is a speciality of Northern Fujianese cuisine, particularly Fuzhou cuisine and Putian cuisine.

Wang Shitong (Chinese: 王世統) popularized yanpi in the first decades of the 20th century by drying it, allowing it to be stored for long periods rather than used on the day it was made.

== See also ==
- Fuzhou cuisine
