= Koah-pau =

Chinese-style pork sandwich originating from Fujian province

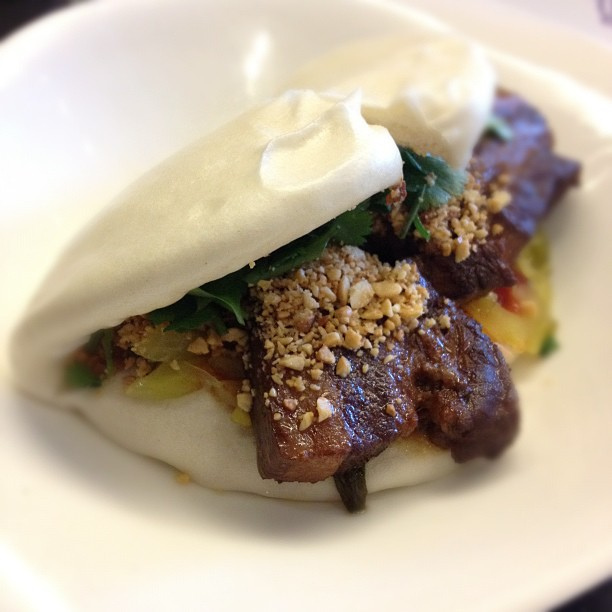
- A traditional gua bao
- Alternative names: cuapao
- Course: Snack, main dish, side dish
- Place of origin: China
- Region or state: Fujian
- Serving temperature: Hot
- Main ingredients: Lotus leaf bread, stewed meat, condiments
- Ingredients generally used: Red-cooked pork belly, pickled mustard, coriander, ground peanuts
- Variations: Fried chicken, fish, eggs, stewed beef, lettuce

Koah-pau

Chinese name
- Chinese: 割包 or 刈包
- Literal meaning: cut bun
Transcriptions
Standard Mandarin
- Hanyu Pinyin: guàbāo
Southern Min
- Hokkien POJ: koah-pau

Alternative Chinese name
- Traditional Chinese: 肉夾包
- Simplified Chinese: 肉夹包
- Literal meaning: meat between buns
Transcriptions
Standard Mandarin
- Hanyu Pinyin: ròujiābāo

Japanese name
- Kanji: 角煮饅頭
Transcriptions
- Romanization: kakuni manjū

Tagalog name
- Tagalog: kuwapaw

Koah-pau or gua bao or cuapao also known as a pork belly bun, ambiguously as bao, or erroneously as bao bun, is a type of lotus leaf bun originating from Fujianese cuisine in China. It is also a popular snack in Taiwan, Singapore, Malaysia, the Philippines, and Nagasaki Chinatown in Japan.

It consists of a slice of stewed meat and condiments sandwiched between flat steamed bread known as lotus leaf bread (荷葉餅; héyèbǐng). The lotus leaf bread is typically 6–8 centimetres (2.4–3.1 in) in size, semi-circular and flat in form, with a horizontal fold that, when opened, gives the appearance that it has been sliced. The traditional filling for gua bao is a slice of red-cooked pork belly, typically dressed with stir-fried suan cai (pickled mustard greens), coriander, and ground peanuts.

== Etymology ==
In Hokkien, the word gua or cua (Chinese: 割/刈; Pe̍h-ōe-jī: koah) means to cut by drawing the knife through an object. In the context of food, bao or pao (包; Pe̍h-ōe-jī: pau) means "bun", which makes the term "bao bun" redundant. In Mandarin, bao (包) is used to name various types of buns and breads (such as baozi). However, it is uncommon for bao (包) to be used in isolation when referring to these foods.

== History ==
=== In Asia ===
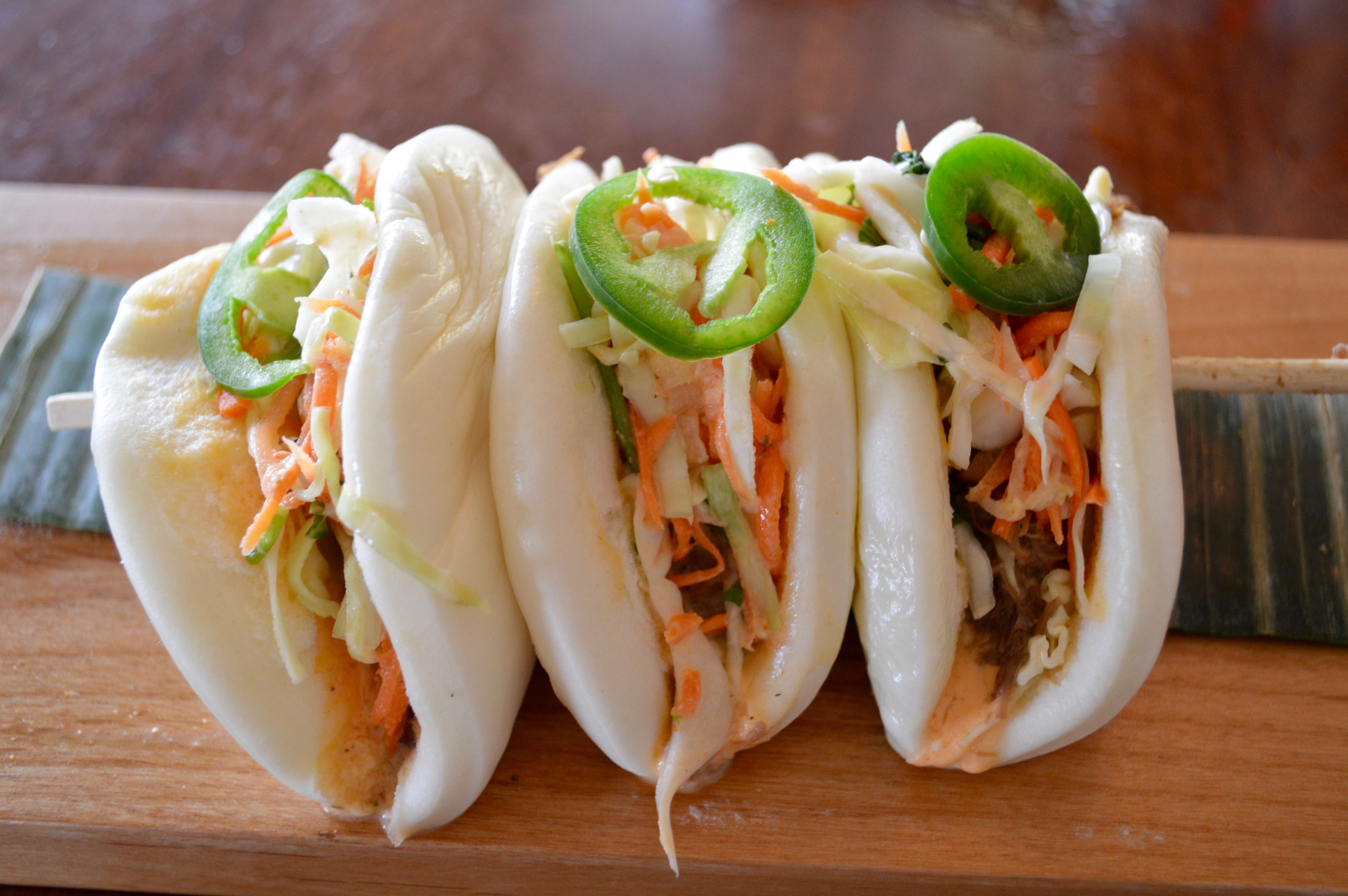
Gua bao with bell pepper and water chestnut

The gua bao originated from the coastal regions of Fujian province in China. It is said to have come from either the cities of Quanzhou or Fuzhou. In Quanzhou, gua bao is known as rou jia bao (肉夹包; 'meat between buns') or hu yao shi (虎咬狮; 'tiger bites lion'). The custom of Hui'an people in Quanzhou is to eat these pork belly buns to celebrate the marrying off of a daughter. In Jinjiang, a county of Quanzhou, there is a related vegetarian dish known as hu yao cao (虎咬草; 'tiger bites grass') that replaces the pork with a solidified peanut paste and the lotus leaf bread with a bread that is baked in a clay oven similar to a tandoor.

In Taiwan, gua bao are believed to have been introduced to the island by Fuzhounese immigrants. Fuzhou rice vinasse meat is wrapped in it, and ingredients are chopped and soaked in meat gravy to eat. The food is known colloquially in parts of Taiwan as hó͘-kā-ti (虎咬豬; 'tiger bites pig') in Taiwanese Hokkien due to the mouth-like form of the bun and the contents of the filling. Gua bao was a food that merchants consumed during ritual festivals when Taiwan was under Japanese rule. According to the research of Yu-Jen Chen, pork was expensive and not easy to acquire at that time, and flour was also scarce. As a result, the gua bao only became a popular street food among the public in Taiwan in the 1970s. Gua bao is now a popular Taiwanese street snack food and often offered with Sishen soup (四神湯; sù-sîn-thng) at night markets.

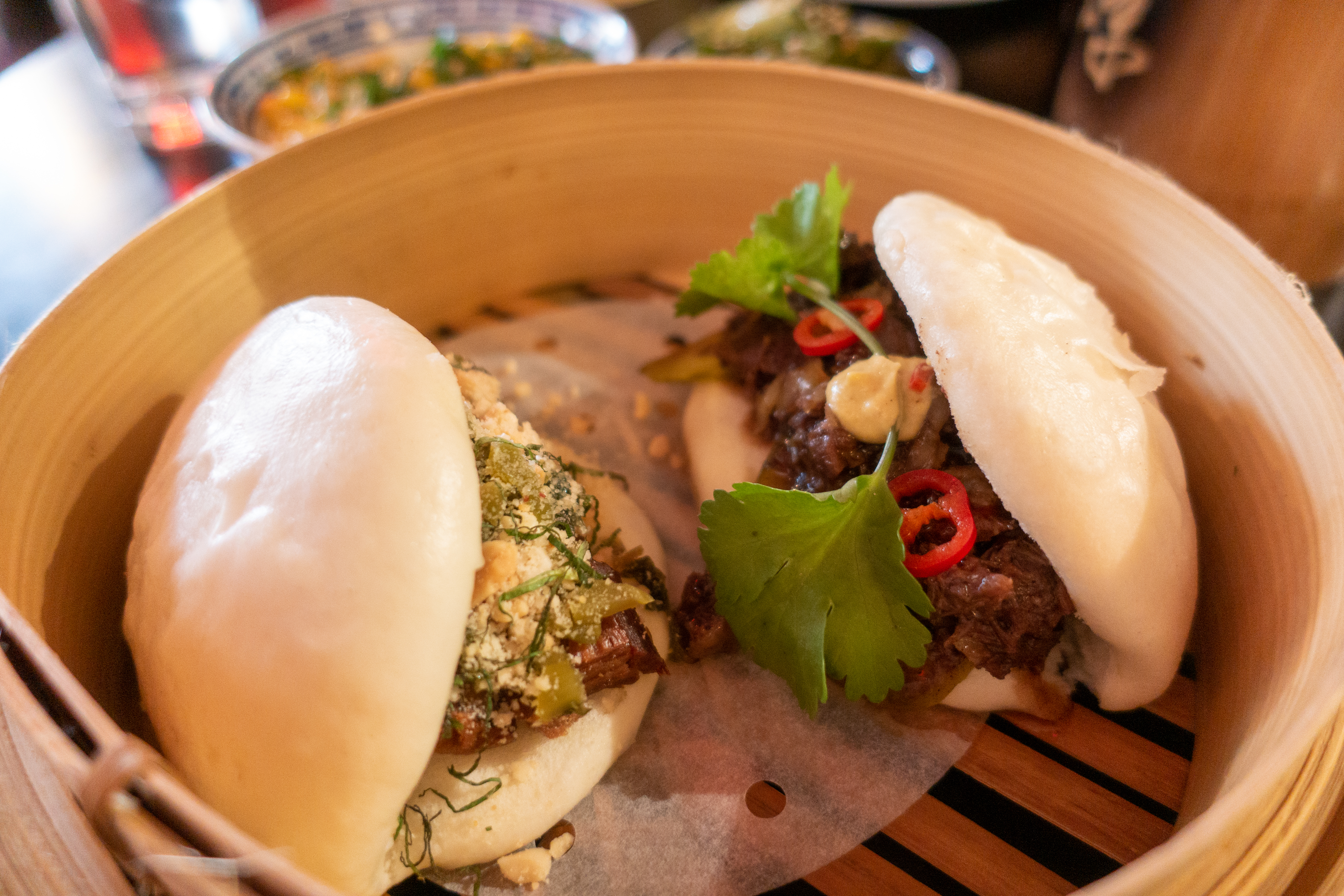
In a bamboo steamer

In Singapore and Malaysia, the dish is popular among the Hokkien community, where it is known as kong bak pau (扣肉包; khòng-bah-pau).

In the Philippines, it is served in Chinese Filipino restaurants throughout the country, where it is known as cuapao (割包; koah-pau).

In Hong Kong, they are known as cha bao (叉包) which means "fork buns" as the sandwiches are usually pierced by a toothpick or bamboo skewer to keep the fillings in place.

In Japan they are called kakuni manju and are sold as a Chinese snack food. They are a specialty of Nagasaki Chinatown, having been sold in Japan for centuries due to the large number of Fuzhounese immigrants and historic relations between Fuzhou and Nagasaki represented by the construction of Sofukuji Temple. Recognizing the Fuzhounese community and historical connection, Nagasaki and Fuzhou established ties as sister cities in 1980.

=== In the West ===
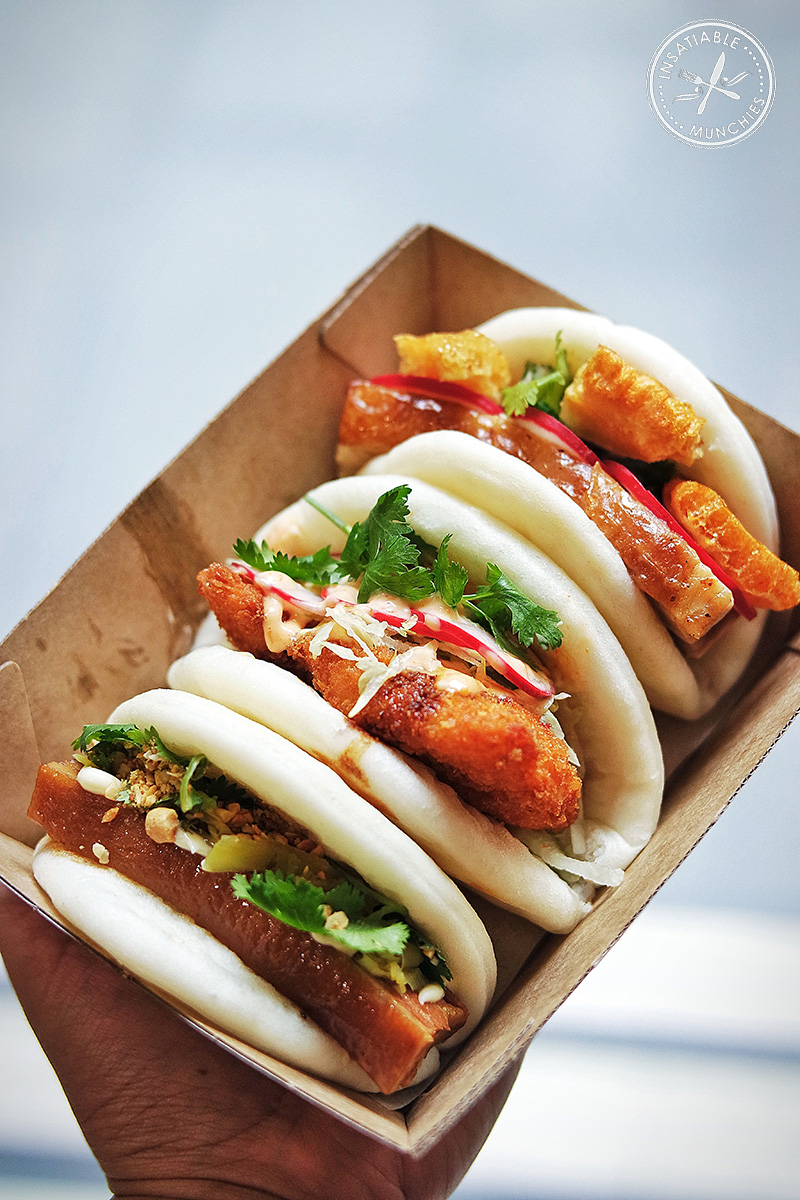
Gua bao from Sydney

Gua bao became popular in the early 2000s in the West through chef David Chang's Momofuku restaurants (c. 2004) although he says that he was unaware that the gua bao dish already existed. His Momofuku recipe was born out of a desire to use leftover pork from his ramen, and he was inspired by his dining experiences in Beijing and Manhattan Chinatown's Oriental Garden where the Peking duck was served on lotus leaf bread rather than the traditional spring pancake. He called his creation pork belly buns. The name "gua bao" was used and popularised by chef Eddie Huang when he opened his BaoHaus restaurant (c. 2009). Many other restaurants serving gua bao have opened up since then, but they often refer to the dish by the ambiguous name "bao" or the erroneous name "bao bun".

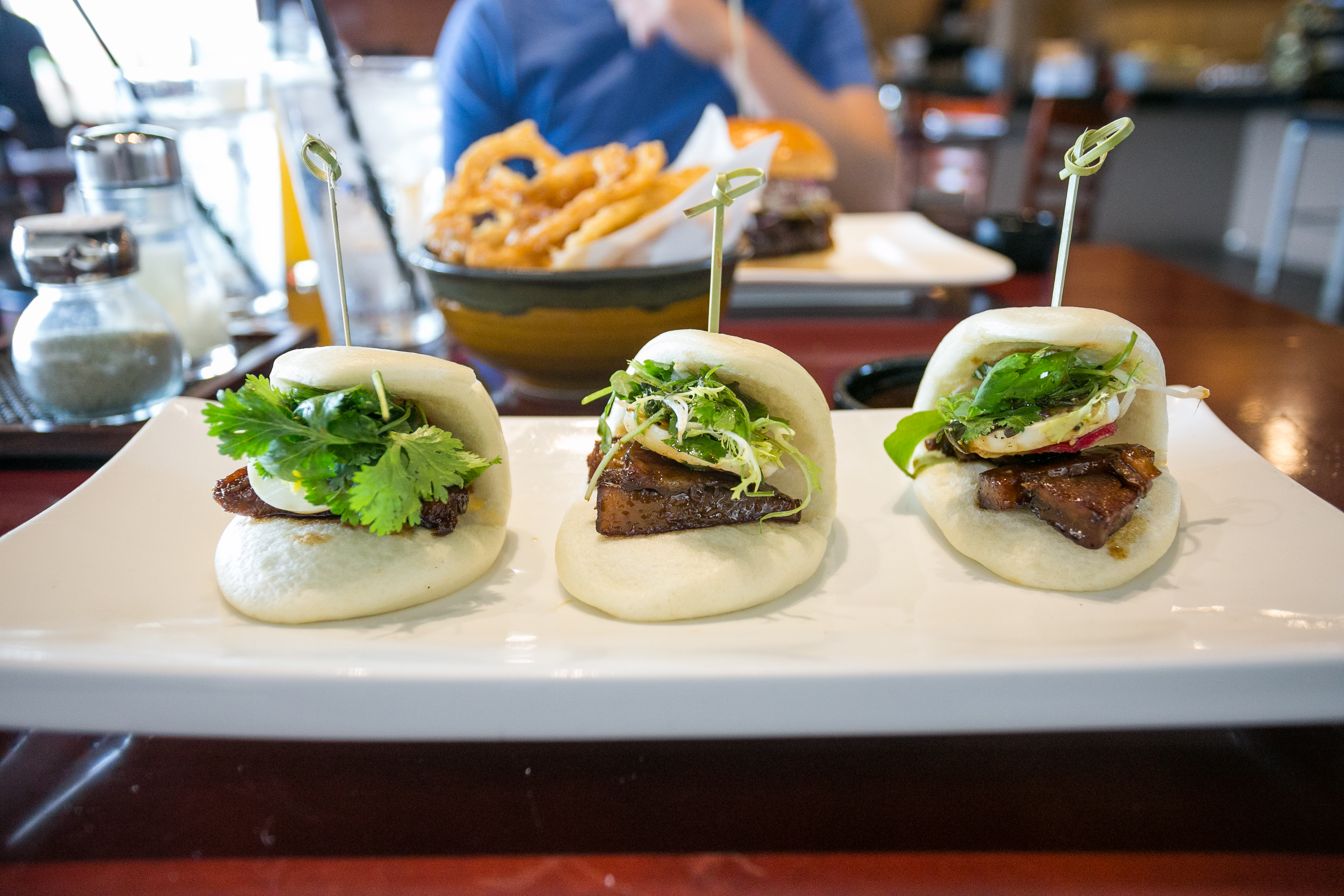
Gua bao from Las Vegas

In the United States, New York City has a significant population of Fuzhounese Americans and gua bao is a popular dish sold at restaurants along with other iconic Fuzhounese dishes such as Fuzhou fish balls and lychee pork.

In the United Kingdom, Erchen Chang, Wai Ting and Shing Tat Chung opened BAO in London, further popularizing the snack in the West. Gua bao are often called hirata buns in the United Kingdom, named after Masashi Hirata, the executive chef of Ippudo in New York as many ramen restaurants began to adopt the practise of selling gua bao alongside their ramen dishes due to the influence of Momofuku and to meet high demand from customers who mistakenly believed that the gua bao was a Japanese food item.

There have been many new trendy "gua bao" which incorporate pan-Asian fusion or non-Chinese fillings between the lotus leaf buns, such as kimchi or karaage. Although these are technically not gua bao at all as they do not include pork belly, and in China would only be considered different lotus leaf bun sandwiches (he ye bao).

== Gallery ==
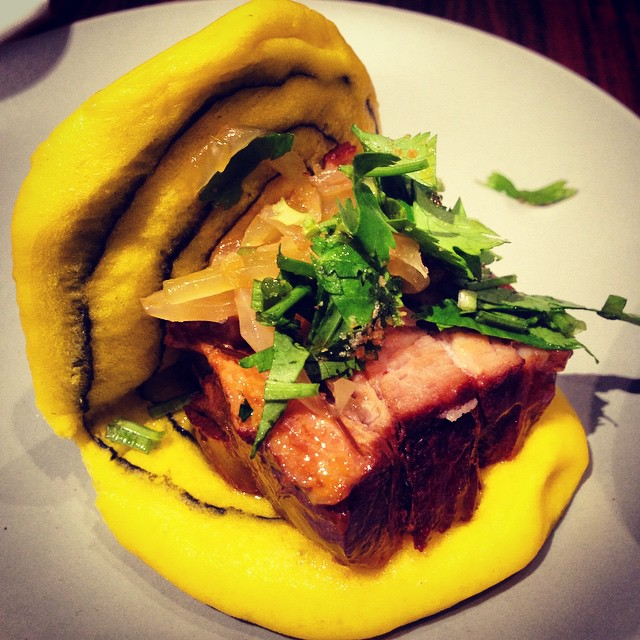
With Dongpo pork

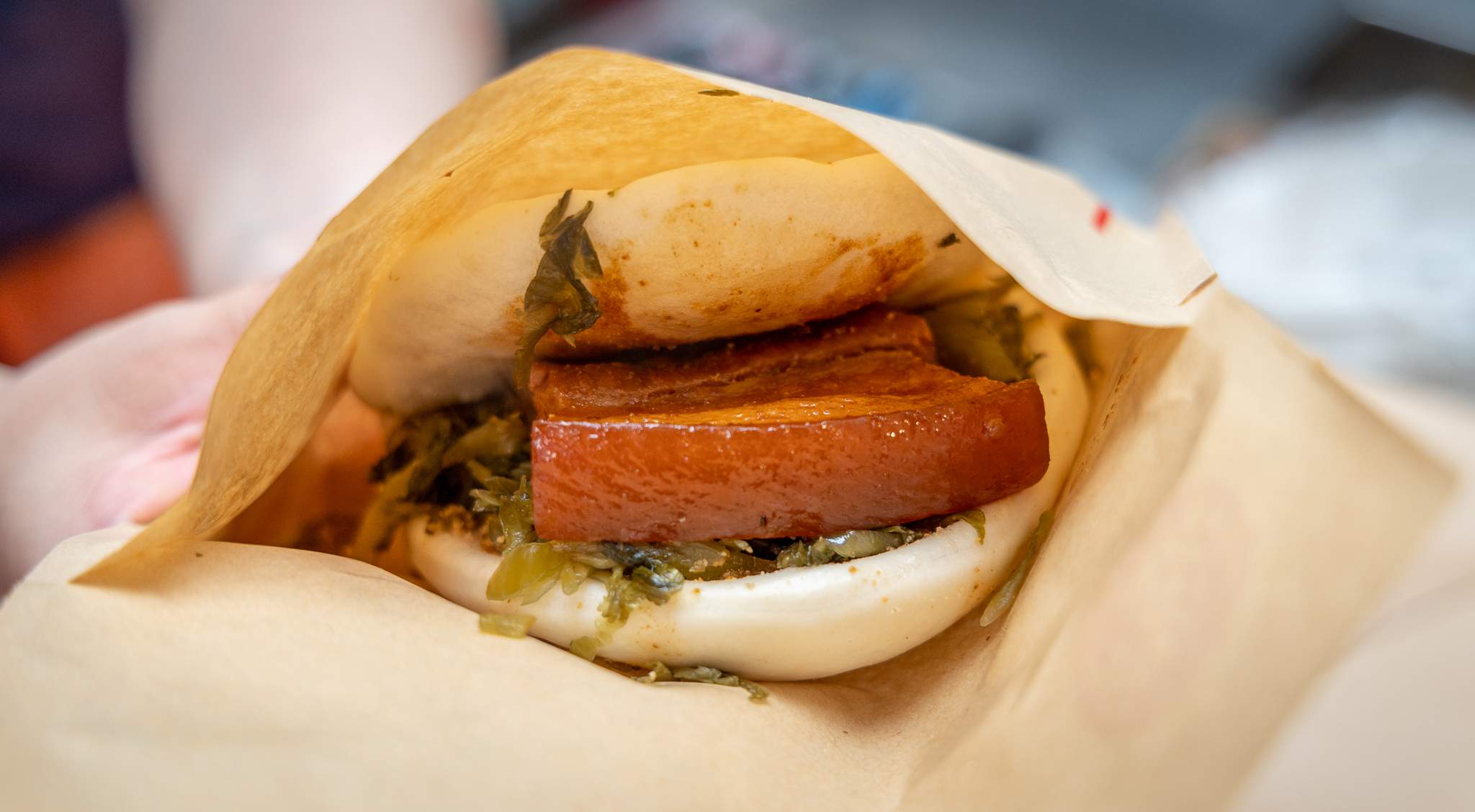
With Dongpo pork and suan cai

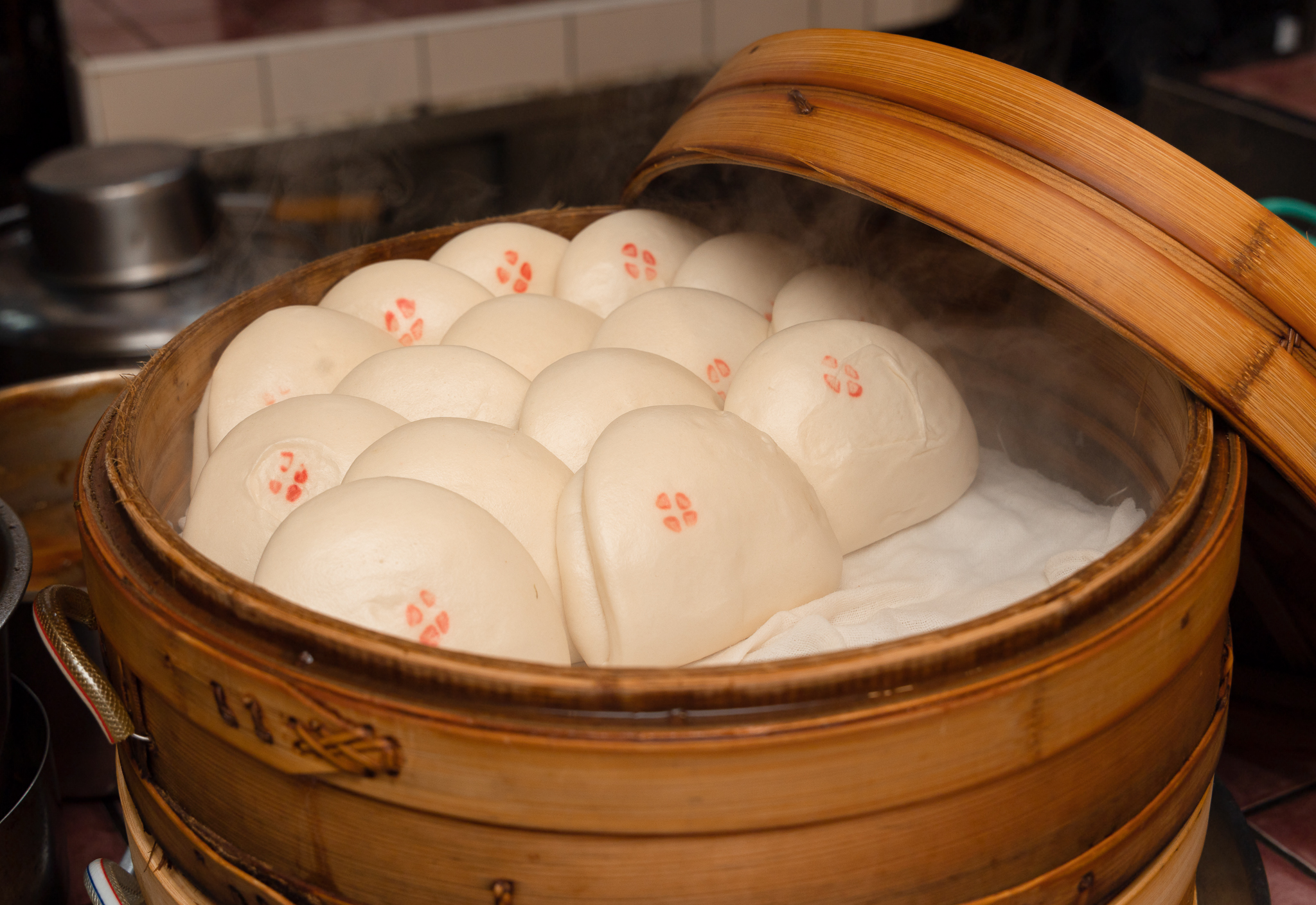
Steamed lotus leaf bread

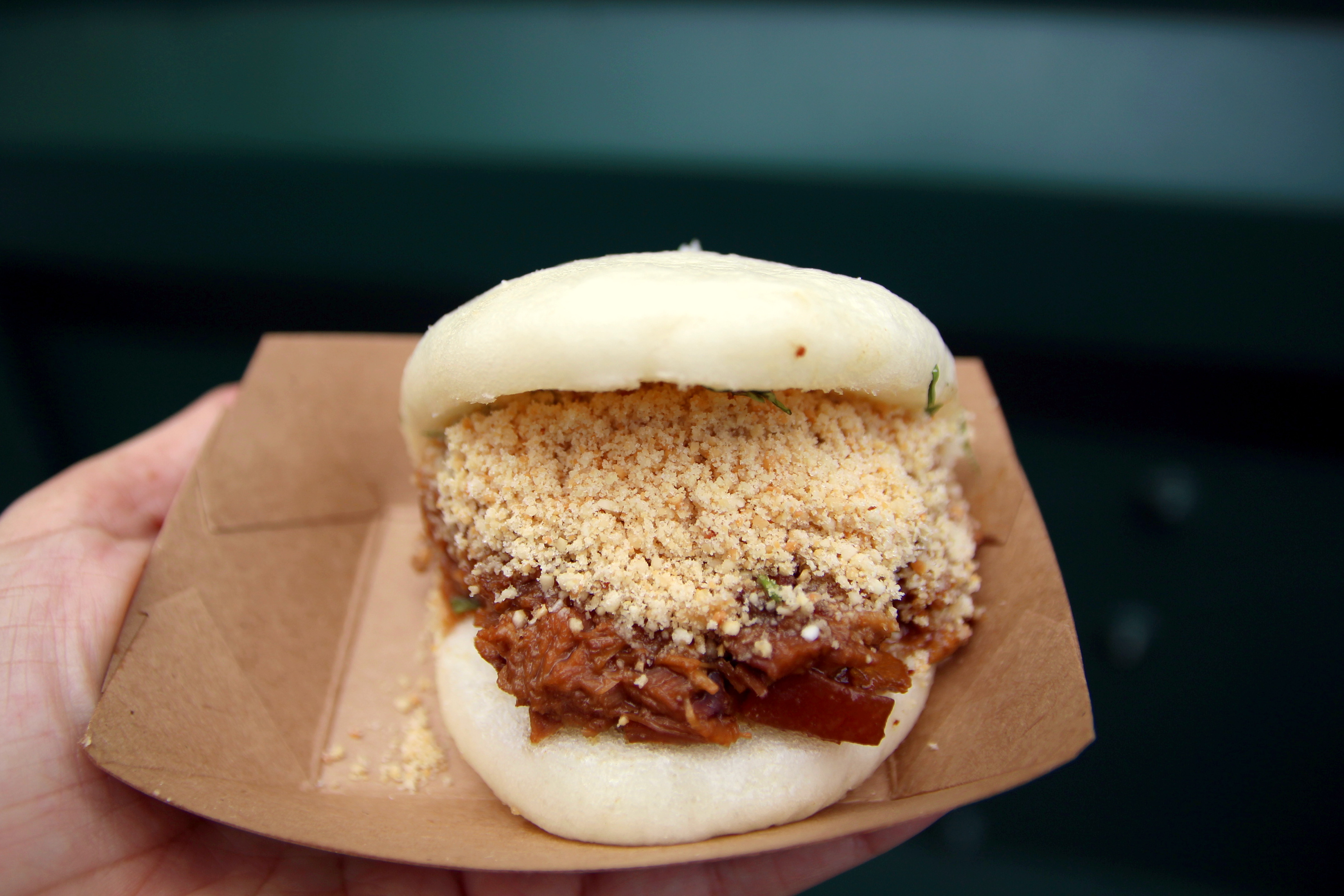
With peanut powder

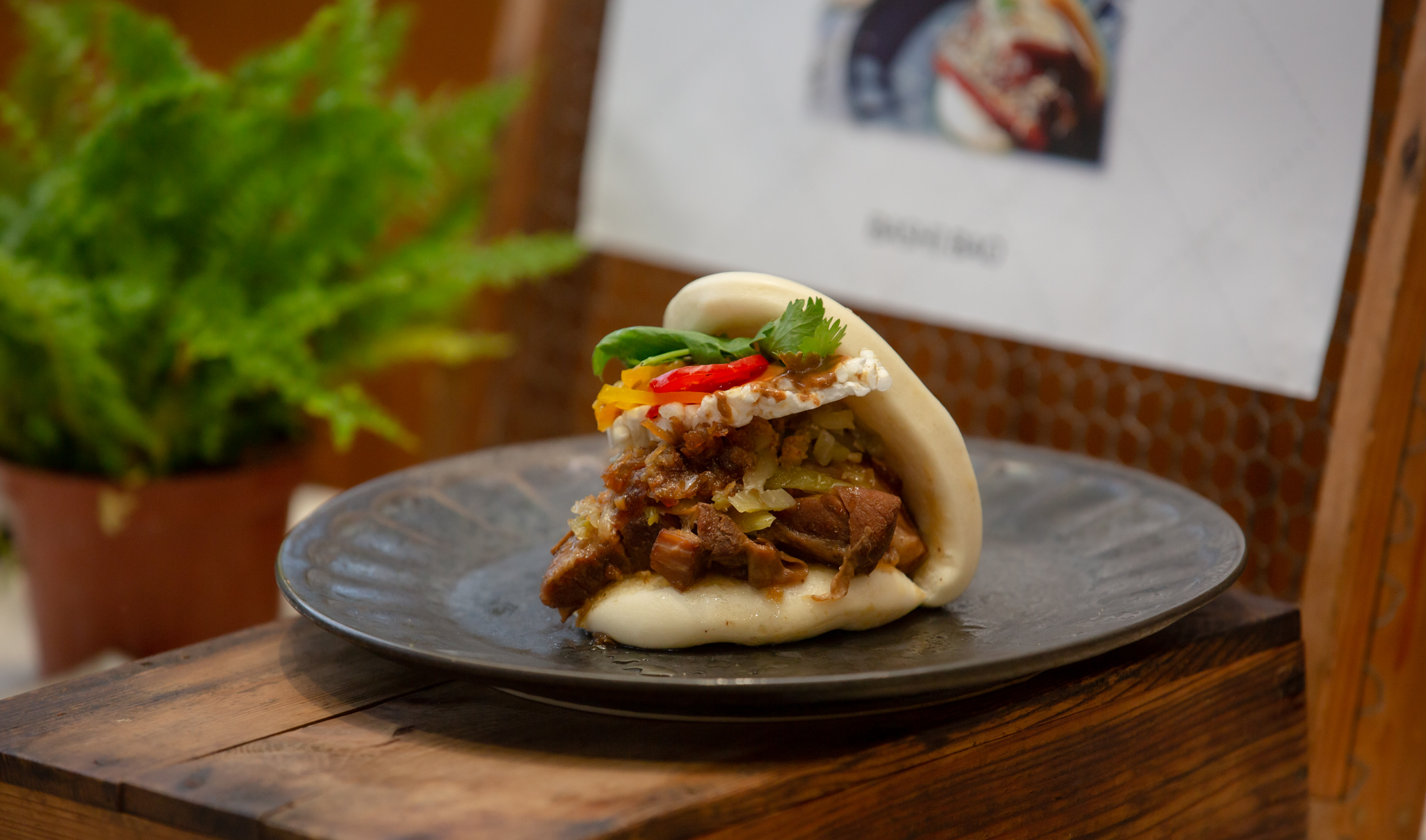

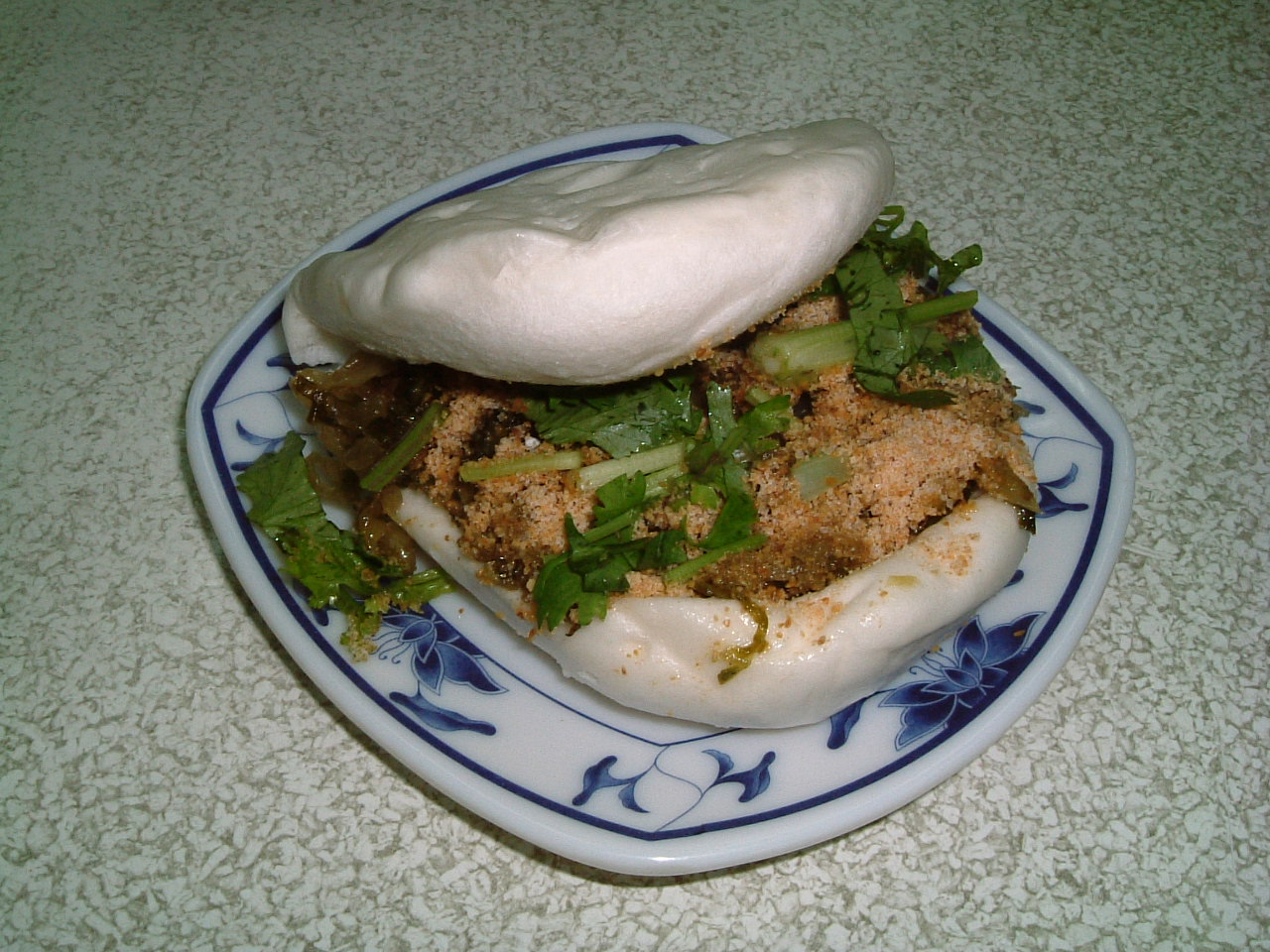

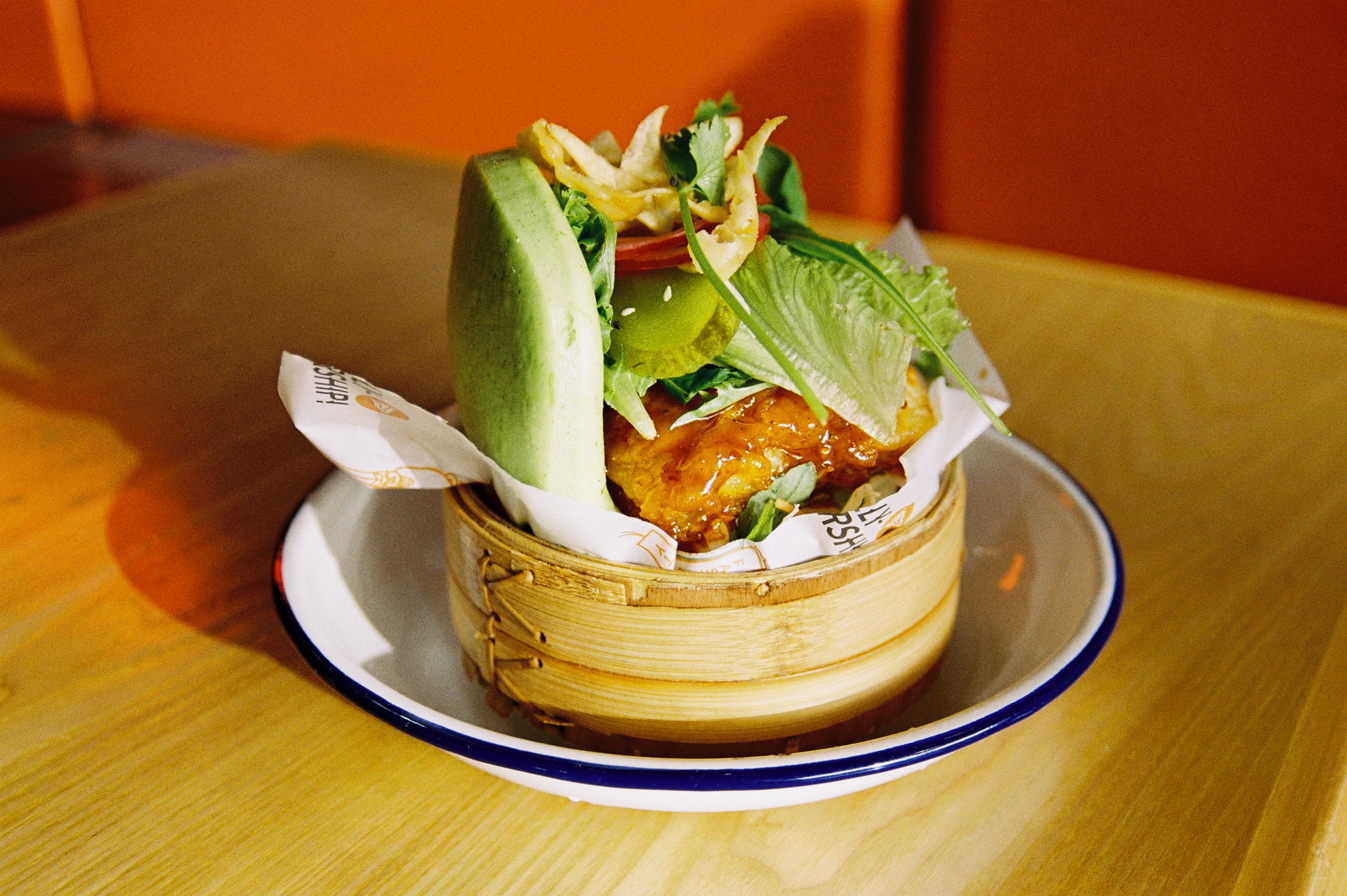
With fish

== See also ==
- List of sandwiches
- List of snack foods
- Fujian cuisine
- Taiwanese cuisine
- Zhangcha duck
- Hamburger
- Roujiamo, a similar food from Shaanxi Province
