= Lotus leaf bread =

Chinese steamed bread

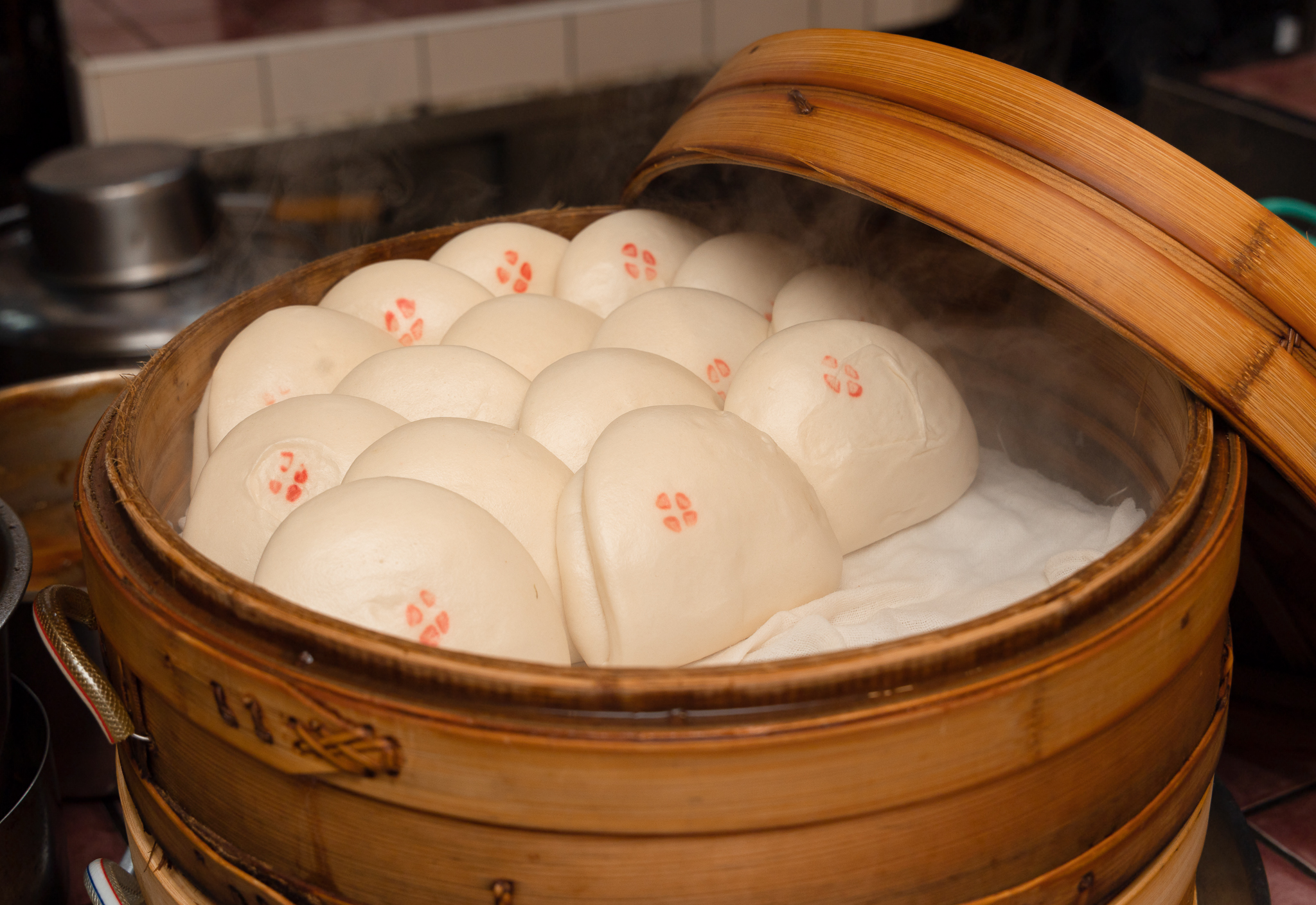
- In a bamboo steamer
- Place of origin: China
- Associated cuisine: Chinese cuisine
- Main ingredients: Wheat flour
- Similar dishes: Baozi

Lotus leaf bread (Chinese: 荷叶饼; pinyin: hé yè bǐng) is a Chinese steamed bread. Semi-circular and flat, the loaves are similar in design to a clamshell. They have a horizontal fold that, when opened, gives the appearance that it has been sliced. Lines or patterns may be added to increase the resemblance to a lotus leaf. If the lotus leaf bread is stuffed with fillings, it is referred to as a lotus leaf bun (Chinese: 荷叶包; pinyin: hé yè bāo). The bread is traditionally eaten with rich meat dishes such as roast duck or pork belly. The lotus leaf bread is best known outside China as the bread used in the Fujianese dish gua bao.

== Gallery ==
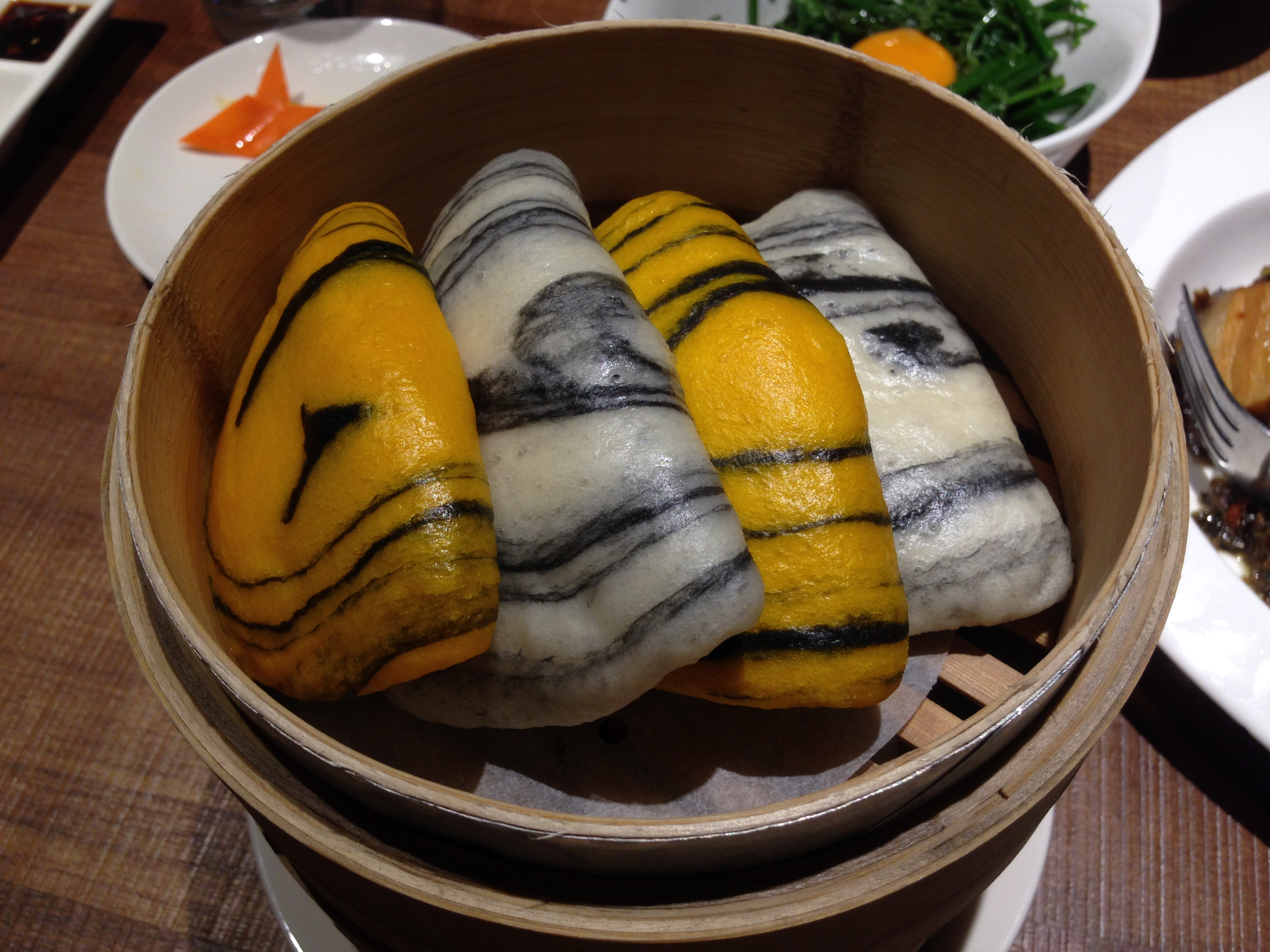
"Tiger" and "zebra" style

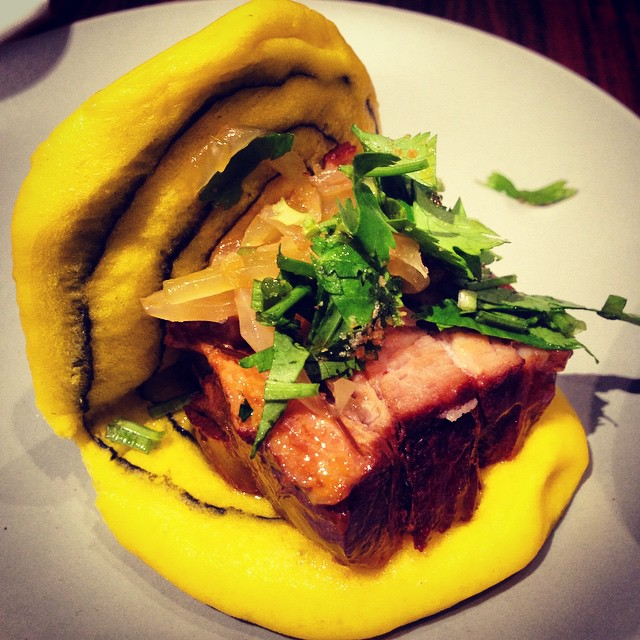
Used to wrap gua bao

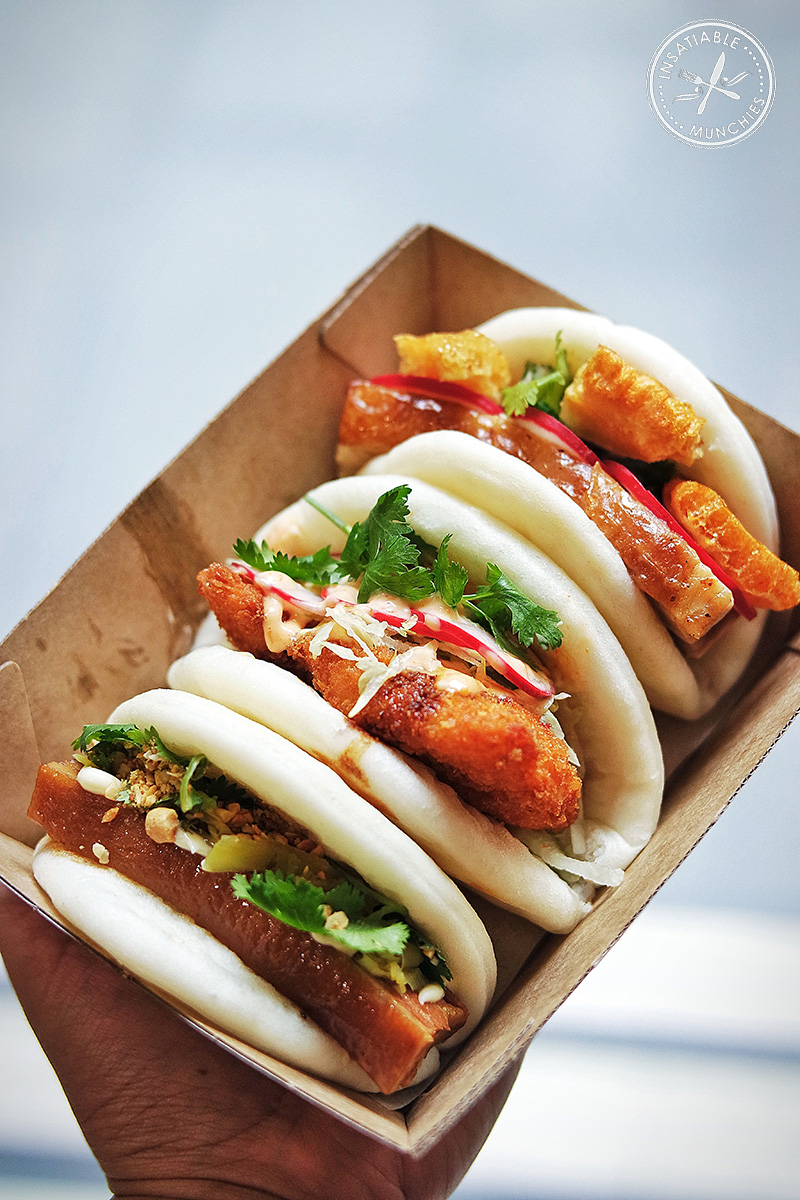

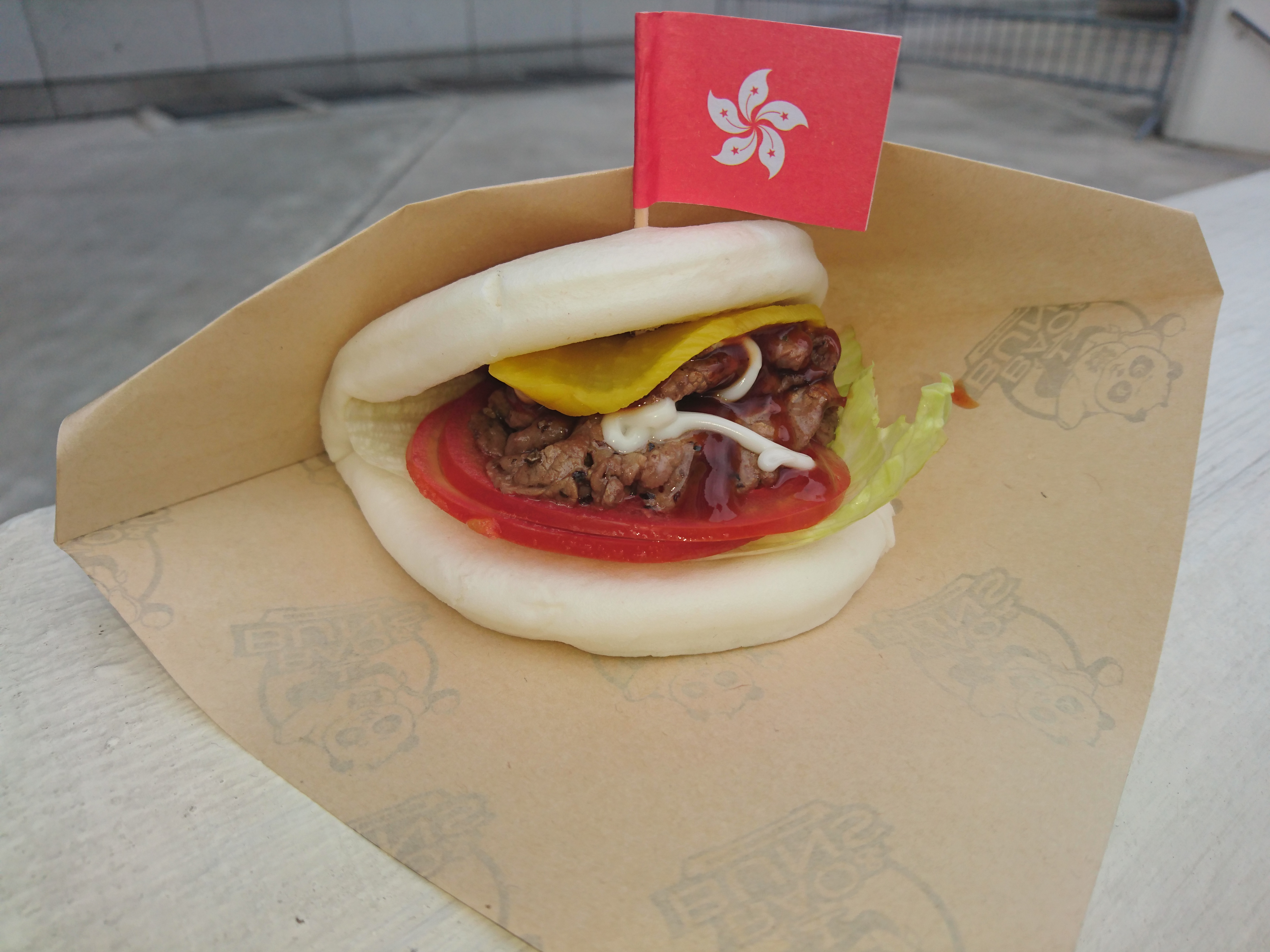
