= Erchen Chang =

Taiwanese chef

- Born: Taiwan
- Education: Slade School of Fine Art, University College London
- Spouse: Shing Tat Chung
- Culinary career
- Cooking style: Taiwanese cuisine
- Current restaurant(s): Bao; Bao Fitzrovia; Xu

Erchen Chang (Chinese: 張爾宬; pinyin: Zhāng ěr chéng) is a Taiwanese chef, who is a creative director and co-founder at the restaurants Bao, Bao Fitzrovia and Xu in London, England.

== Career ==
Erchen Chang lived in Taiwan until she was 14, and was schooled some distance away from where her family lived. As a result, she became very familiar with eating at the night markets in Taiwan. At her home, her grandmother would take charge of cooking for the family, usually for at least ten people at a time. While Chang would try to help her, she found it difficult to keep up and would often only do minor tasks like adding garnishes. She was then sent to London to attend boarding school.

While studying art at the Slade School of Fine Art within University College London, she met Shing Tat Chung. The pair would take trips back to Taiwan together; Tat Chung's parents had run a Cantonese restaurant in Nottingham. Together with Tat Chung's sister, Wai Ting Chung, the trio opened the street food stand Bao in 2012. This was under KERB, a London based street food collective. Following some success, they opened a semi-permanent fixture at Netil Market in Hackney. A permanent location in Soho then followed, with Chang and her now husband Shing Tat Chung working in the kitchen and Wai Ting Chung running the front of house.

As well as opening a second permanent Bao location in Fitzrovia, she developed the concept for a more formal dining experience at the restaurant Xu. Chang chose to name the new restaurant after her grandfather. At those restaurants, she has worked to develop certain Taiwanese dishes such as century egg and pig's blood cake for a western audience.
