= Putian cuisine =

Style of Chinese cuisine

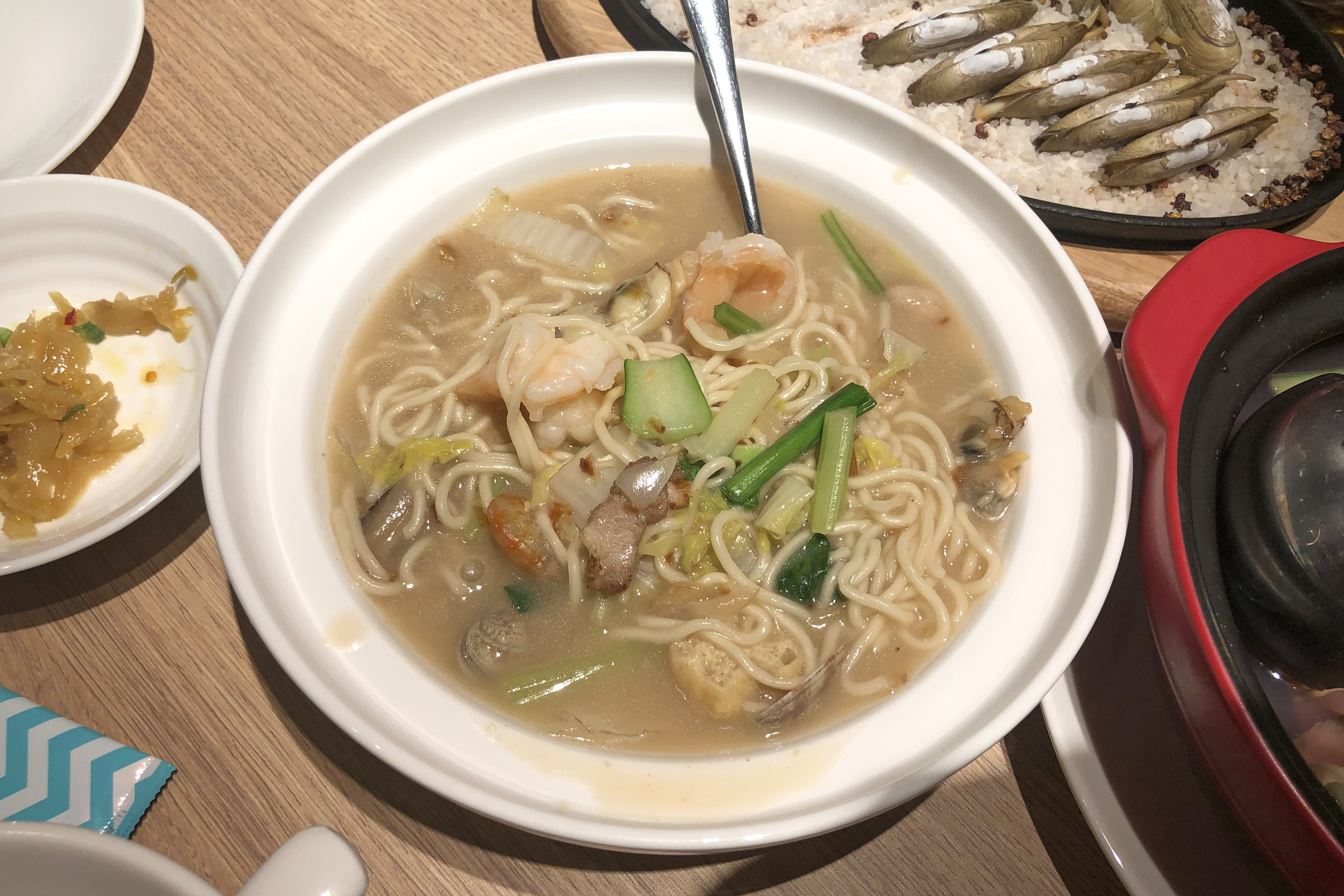
- Putian-style lor mee
- Chinese: 莆田菜
Transcriptions
Standard Mandarin
- Hanyu Pinyin: Pútián cài
Southern Min
- Hokkien POJ: Pó-chéng chhài

Henghwa cuisine
- Traditional Chinese: 興化菜
- Simplified Chinese: 兴化菜
Transcriptions
Standard Mandarin
- Hanyu Pinyin: Xīnghuà cài
Southern Min
- Hokkien POJ: Hing-hua̍-chhài

Putian cuisine, also known as Henghwa cuisine or Henghua cuisine, is a style of Chinese cuisine originating from the Putian people of Putian, Fujian Province. It is a style of Fujian cuisine.

Since Putian is a coastal area, ingredients such as seaweed, oysters, clams and other seafood are commonly used in Putian cuisine.

Putian cuisine is also eaten by the Chinese diaspora in South-East Asia. The eponymous "Putien" restaurant in Singapore, originally a simple kopitiam, won a Michelin star in 2016 and has since franchised itself into an international chain.

== Notable dishes ==
English	Traditional Chinese	Simplified Chinese	Pinyin	Pe̍h-ōe-jī	Description
Bian rou soup		扁肉汤	biǎn ròu tāng		Fine pork dumplings in broth. The dumpling wrapper itself is also made from pork meat.
Duotou clams		哆头蛏	duō tóu chēng		Chinese razor clams (Sinonovacula constricta) from the village of Duotou are a seasonal delicacy available from April to August.
Henghwa fried bee hoon		兴化炒米粉			
Lor mee	滷麵	卤面	lǔ miàn	ló͘-mī	
Lychee pork					
Stir-fried yam					

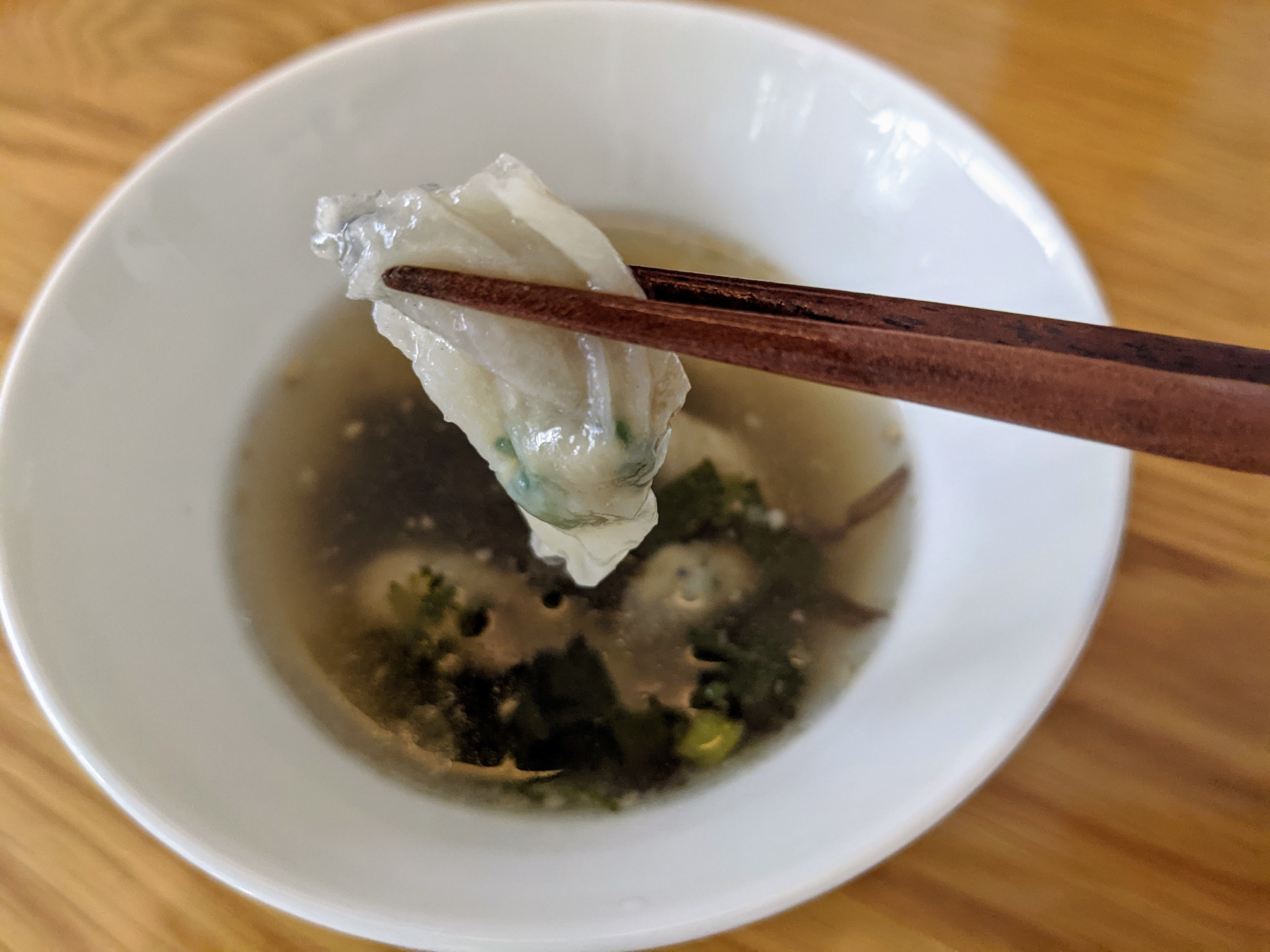
Bian rou dumpling soup

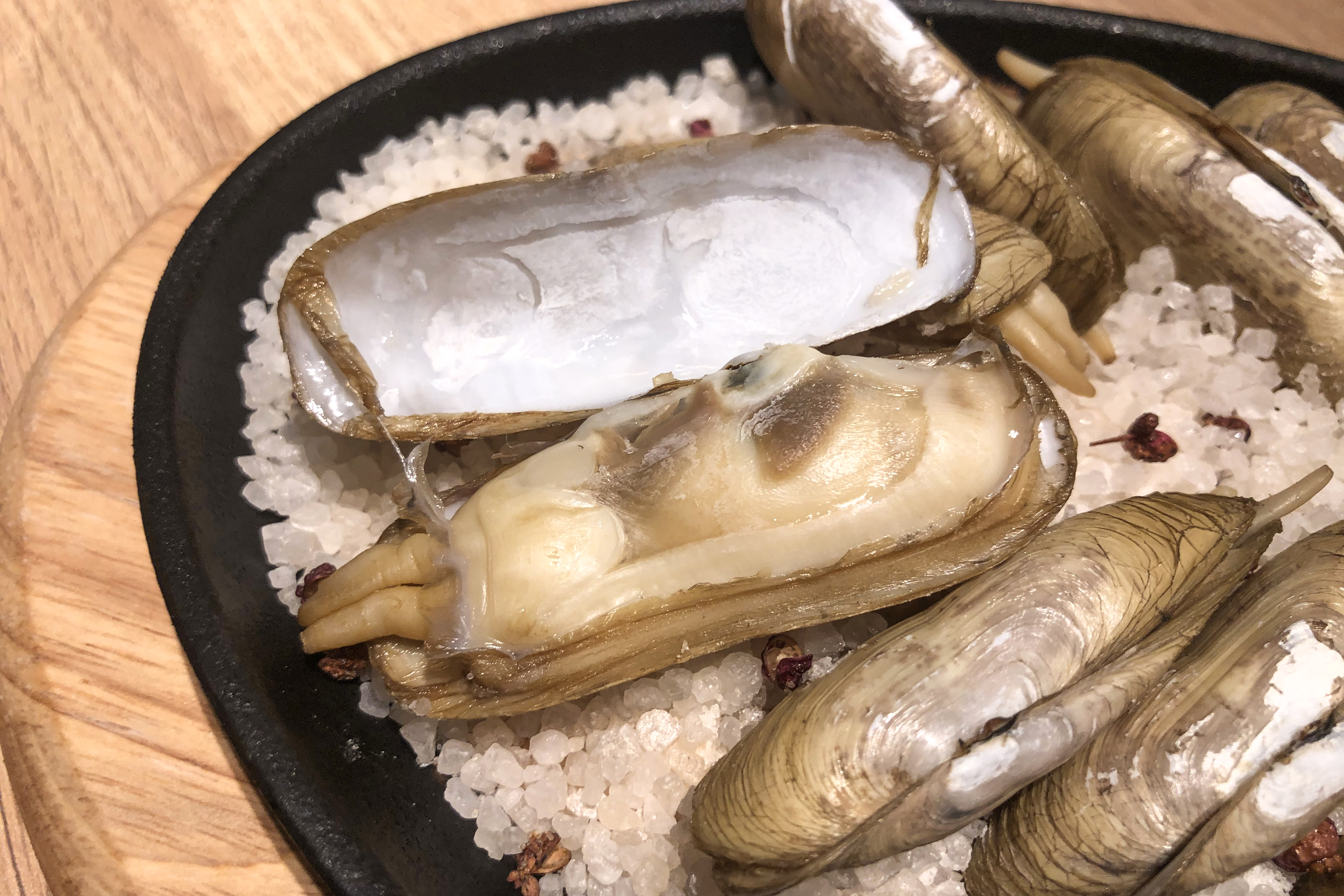
Salt-baked duotou clams
