= Fujian cuisine =

Chinese regional cuisine from Fujian province

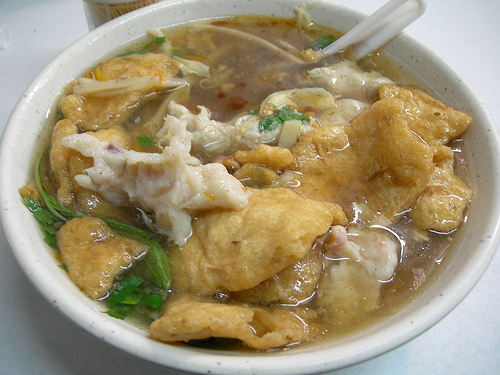
- A bowl of Fujian broth soup, or geng (羹). Fujian-style cuisine contains soups, soupy dishes, and stews.
- Chinese: 福建菜
Transcriptions
Standard Mandarin
- Hanyu Pinyin: Fújiàn cài
Southern Min
- Hokkien POJ: Hok-kiàn chhài

Min cuisine
- Traditional Chinese: 閩菜
- Simplified Chinese: 闽菜
Transcriptions
Standard Mandarin
- Hanyu Pinyin: Mǐn cài
Southern Min
- Hokkien POJ: Bân-chhài

Fujian cuisine or Fujianese cuisine, also known as Min cuisine, is one of the native Chinese cuisines derived from the cooking style of China's Fujian Province, most notably from the provincial capital, Fuzhou. "Fujian cuisine" in this article refers to the cuisines of Min Chinese-speaking people within Fujian. Other cuisines in Fujian include Putian cuisine, Hokkien cuisine, Hakka cuisine, and the ethnic minority cuisines of the She and Tanka people. Fujian cuisine is known to be light but flavourful, soft, and tender, with particular emphasis on umami taste, known in Chinese cooking as xianwei (鲜味; 鮮味; xiān wèi; sian bī), as well as retaining the original flavour of the main ingredients instead of masking them.

Many diverse seafood and woodland ingredients are used, including a variety of local fish, shellfish and turtles, or indigenous edible mushrooms and bamboo shoots, provided by the coastal and mountainous regions of Fujian. The most commonly employed cooking techniques in the region's cuisine include braising, stewing, steaming and boiling.

As the people of Fujian often travel to and from the sea, their food customs have gradually formed a unique cuisine with creative characteristics. Fujian cuisine is famous for preparing mountain and seafood based on good color, aroma, and shape, especially "fragrance" and "taste." Its fresh, mellow, meaty, non-greasy style characteristics and the features of a wide range of soups take a unique place in the field of Chinese cuisine.

Particular attention is paid on the finesse of knife skills and cooking technique of the chefs, which is used to enhance the flavour, aroma and texture of seafood and other foods. Strong emphasis is put on the making and utilising of broth and soups. There are sayings in the region's cuisine: "One broth can be changed into numerous (ten) forms" (一汤十变; 一湯十變; yī tāng shí biàn; chit thong sip piàn) and "It is unacceptable for a meal to not have soup" (不汤不行; 不湯不行; bù tāng bù xíng; put thong put hêng).

Fermented fish sauce, known locally as "shrimp oil" (虾油; 蝦油; xiā yóu; hâ iû), is also commonly used in the cuisine, along with oyster, crab and shrimp. Peanuts (utilised for both savoury dishes and desserts) are also prevalent, and can be boiled, fried, roasted, crushed, ground or turned into a paste. Peanuts can be used as a garnish, feature in soups and be added to braised or stir-fried dishes.

Fujian cuisine has had a profound impact on Taiwanese cuisine and on the overseas Chinese cuisines found in Japan, North America, and Southeast Asia (particularly the Malay Archipelago), as the majority of Taiwanese and Southeast Asian Chinese people have ancestral roots in Minnan region of Fujian province.

== Styles ==
Fujian cuisine consists of several styles:

- Fuzhou: The taste is lighter compared to other styles, often with an equally mixed taste of sweet and sour. Fuzhou is famous for its soups, and its use of fermented fish sauce and red yeast rice.
- Putian or Henghwa: From the coastal town of Putian, best known for seafood dishes including lor mee and Duotuo clams.
- Southern Fujian: The taste is stronger than other Fujianese cuisines, showing obvious influence from Southeast Asian dishes. Use of sugar and spices (like shacha sauce and five-spice powder) is more common. Various kinds of slow-cooked soup (not quite similar to the Cantonese tradition) are found. Many dishes come with dipping sauces.
- Western Fujian: There are often slight spicy tastes from mustard and pepper and the cooking methods are often steaming, frying and stir-frying. The food is saltier and oilier compared to other parts of Fujian, usually focusing on meat rather than seafood.
- Penang and Singapore: This type of Fujian cuisine is thick and spicy, due to the influence from Indian and Malaysian cuisine in Singapore and parts of Malaysia. Curry powder and chilies are often used in this style. The most common method of cooking is stir-frying. Notable dishes include char kway teow, bah kut teh, and tau hu goreng. Noodles are more common in this form of Fujian cuisine.

== Seasonings ==
Unique seasonings from Fujian include fish sauce, shrimp paste, sugar, shacha sauce and preserved apricot. Wine lees from the production of rice wine is also commonly used in all aspects of the region's cuisine. Red yeast rice (红麴/红糟酱; 紅麴/紅糟醬; hóngqū/hóngzāojiàng; ângkhak/ângchauchiòng) is also commonly used in Fujian cuisine, imparting a rosy-red hue to the foods, pleasant aroma, and slightly sweet taste.

Fujian is also well known for its "drunken" (wine marinated) dishes and is famous for the quality of the soup stocks and bases used to flavour their dishes, soups and stews.

== Notable dishes ==
One of the most famous dishes in Fujian cuisine is "Buddha Jumps Over the Wall", a complex dish making use of many ingredients, including shark's fin, sea cucumber, abalone and Shaoxing wine.

Fujian is also notable for yanpi (燕皮; yàn pí; ian phî), literally "swallow skin," a thin wrapper made with large proportions of lean minced pork. This wrapper has a unique texture due to the incorporation of meat and has a "bite" similar to things made with surimi. Yanpi is used to make rouyan (肉燕; ròu yàn; he̍k ian), a type of wonton.

English	Traditional Chinese	Simplified Chinese	Pinyin	Pe̍h-ōe-jī	Description
Bak kut teh	肉骨茶	肉骨茶	ròu gŭ chá	bah-kut-tê	Literally means "meat bone tea". A soup of pork ribs simmered in a broth of herbs and spices including star anise, cinnamon, cloves and garlic. It is usually eaten with rice or noodles.
Banmian	板面	板面	bǎnmiàn	pán-mī	Flat-shaped egg noodle soup
Braised frog	黃燜田雞	黄焖田鸡	huáng mèn tiánjī	n̂g-būn chhân-koe	Frog braised in wine
Buddha Jumps Over the Wall	佛跳牆	佛跳墙	fó tiào qiáng	hu̍t-thiàu-chhiûⁿ	Contains over 30 ingredients, including shark's fin, abalone, sea slug, dried scallops, duck, chicken breast, pig's trotters, mushrooms, pigeon eggs and other ingredients. A legend is that after the dish is cooked, the aroma lingers, and upon detecting the smell, a Buddhist monk forgot his vow to be a vegetarian and leapt over a wall to taste the dish.
Clams in chicken soup	雞湯汆海蚌	鸡汤汆海蚌	jī tāng cuān hǎibàng	koe-thng thún-hái-pāng	Clams cooked in chicken stock
Crispy skin fish rolls	脆皮魚卷	脆皮鱼卷	cuìpí yú juǎn	chhè-phôe hî-kǹg	Fried bean curd skin with fish fillings
Dried scallop with radish	干貝蘿蔔	干贝萝卜	gānbèi luóbò	干貝菜頭kan-pòe chhài-thâu	White radish steamed with conpoy (dried scallop) and Chinese ham
Drunken ribs	醉排骨	醉排骨	zuì páigǔ	chùi pâi-kut	Pork ribs marinated in wine
Eastern Wall Dragon Pearls	東壁龍珠	东壁龙珠	dōng bì lóngzhū	tong-pek liông-chu	Longan fruit with meat fillings
Five Colours Pearls	五彩珍珠扣	五彩珍珠扣	wǔ cǎi zhēnzhū kòu	gō͘-chhái tin-tsu-khàu	Squid braised with vegetables
Five Colours Shrimp	五彩蝦松	五彩虾松	wǔ cǎi xiā sōng	gō͘-chhái hê-siông	Stir-fried diced shrimp and vegetables
Fragrant snails in wine	淡糟香螺片	淡糟香螺片	dàn zāo xiāng luó piàn	tām-chau hiong-lô͘-phìⁿ	Snails cooked with wine lees
Gua bao	割包	刈包	guà bāo	koah-pau	Pork belly buns
Meat strips with green pepper	青椒肉絲	青椒肉丝	qīng jiāo ròu sī	chheⁿ-tsio bah-si	Pork strips with green pepper. It has been adapted to become "pepper steak" in American Chinese cuisine.
Min sheng guo	閩生果	闽生果	mǐn shēng guǒ		Stir-fried raw peanuts
Misua / mee sua	麵線	面线	miàn xiàn	mī-sòaⁿ	A thin variety of Chinese noodles made from wheat flour
Ngo hiang	五香	五香	wǔ xiāng	ngó͘-hiong	Fried roll in five-spice powder filled with minced pork and vegetables. Also known as quekiam or kikiam (a localised pronunciation in the Philippines) and lor bak in places such as Indonesia and Malaysia.
Oyster omelette	蚵仔煎	蚵仔煎	hé zi jiān	ô-á-chian	Omelette with oyster filling
Popiah / Lunpiah	薄餅/潤餅	薄饼/润饼	báobǐng/rùnbǐng	pȯh-piáⁿ	Crepe with bean sauce or soy sauce filling
Red wine chicken	紅糟雞	红糟鸡	hóng zāo jī	âng-chau-koe	Chicken cooked in red yeast rice
Stuffed fish balls	包心魚丸	包心鱼丸	bāo xīn yúwán	pau-sim hî-oân	Fish balls filled with meat
Yanpi	燕皮	燕皮	yàn pí	ian phî	A thin wrapper made with large proportions of lean pork

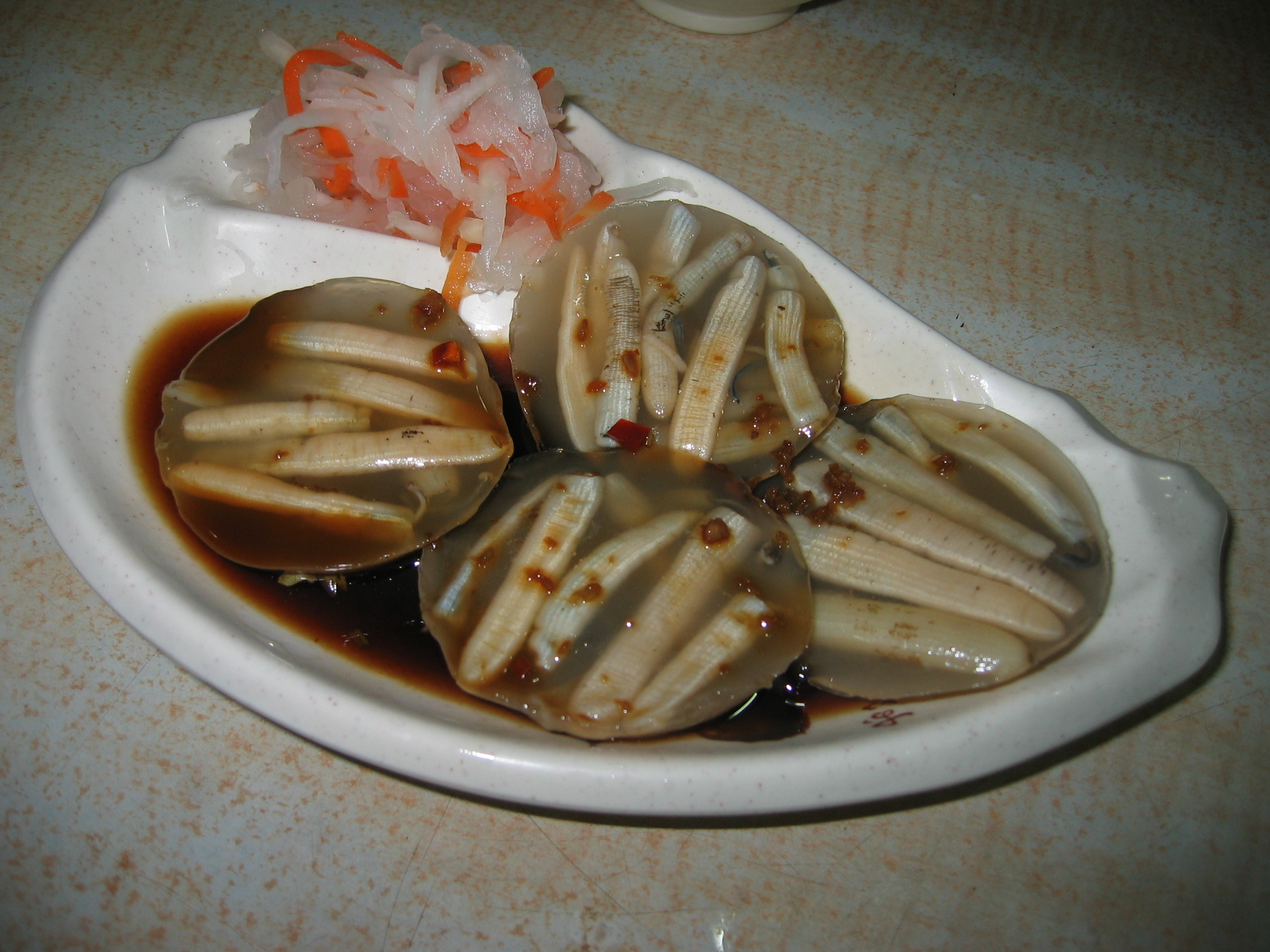
A plate of worm jelly.

There are many eating places around the province that sell these specialties for two yuan, and which are thus known as "two-yuan eateries". In Xiamen, a local specialty is worm jelly (土笋冻; 土笋凍; tǔ sǔn dòng), an aspic made from a species of marine peanut worm.

== See also ==
- Fuzhou cuisine
- Shaxian delicacies
- Ryukyuan cuisine
- Putian cuisine
- Taiwanese cuisine
- List of Chinese dishes
- Chinatown, Flushing
- Brooklyn's Fuzhou Town (福州埠)
- Manhattan's Little Fuzhou (小福州)
