= Mao xue wang =

Chongqing blood and tripe hotpot-style dish

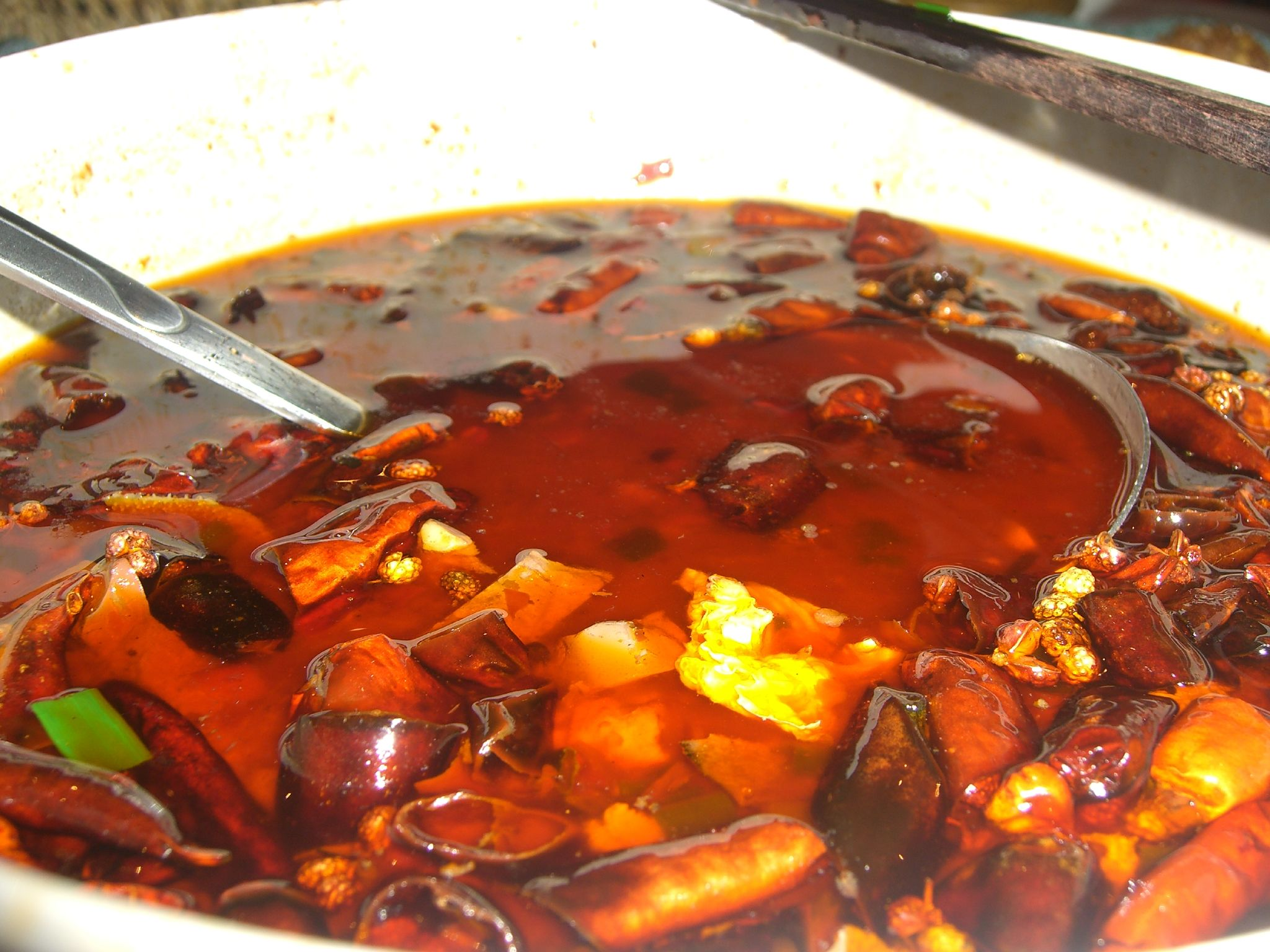
- Type: Shuizhu/hot pot
- Place of origin: Ciqikou, Chongqing
- Region or state: Chongqing, China
- Associated cuisine: Chongqing cuisine
- Invented: 1940s
- Main ingredients: blood curd, mala spice broth & chili oil
- Ingredients generally used: duck blood, tripe, mung bean sprouts, lunch meat, tofu. offal
- Similar dishes: Chongqing hotpot

Mao xue wang (Chinese: 毛血旺, romanized: máoxuèwàng, transl. 'raw blood soup'; Chengdu-Chongqing dialect: 冒血旺, lit. 'rough blood soup') is a Chongqing cuisine dish from Chongqing, China. The dish consists of blood curds and tripe along with mung bean sprouts, served in a mala seasoned oily broth. While similar to Chongqing hot pot in that the broth is not intended to be eaten, mao xue wang is served fully cooked in a communal bowl and is not simmered at the table, comparable to shuizhu.

== Preparation ==
Mao xue wang is typified by blood curds cooked in a mala-spice broth, featuring chili oil with dried chilies and Sichuan peppercorns floating on the surface. Typical additional ingredients include tripe, mung bean sprouts, lunch meat, tofu and other assorted offal.

== Etymology ==
The name mao xue wang is derived from the characters 毛, 'raw'; 血, 'blood'; and 旺, an archaic symbol for 'blood'. In the Chengdu-Chongqing dialect, the first character may be substituted for 冒, 'rough'.

== History ==
The legendary origin of mao xue wang is that the dish was invented by accident in the 1940s in Ciqikou, Chongqing, when a woman at a food booth selling malatang dropped blood curds into the broth; the resulting proto-mao xue wang was immediately popular.

Mao xue wang was identified as one of twelve quintessential Chongqing cuisine dishes by the Chongqing Municipal People's Government in 2012; the dish was defined as a core part of Chongqing cuisine later that year by the National Standardization Administration.

== Gallery ==
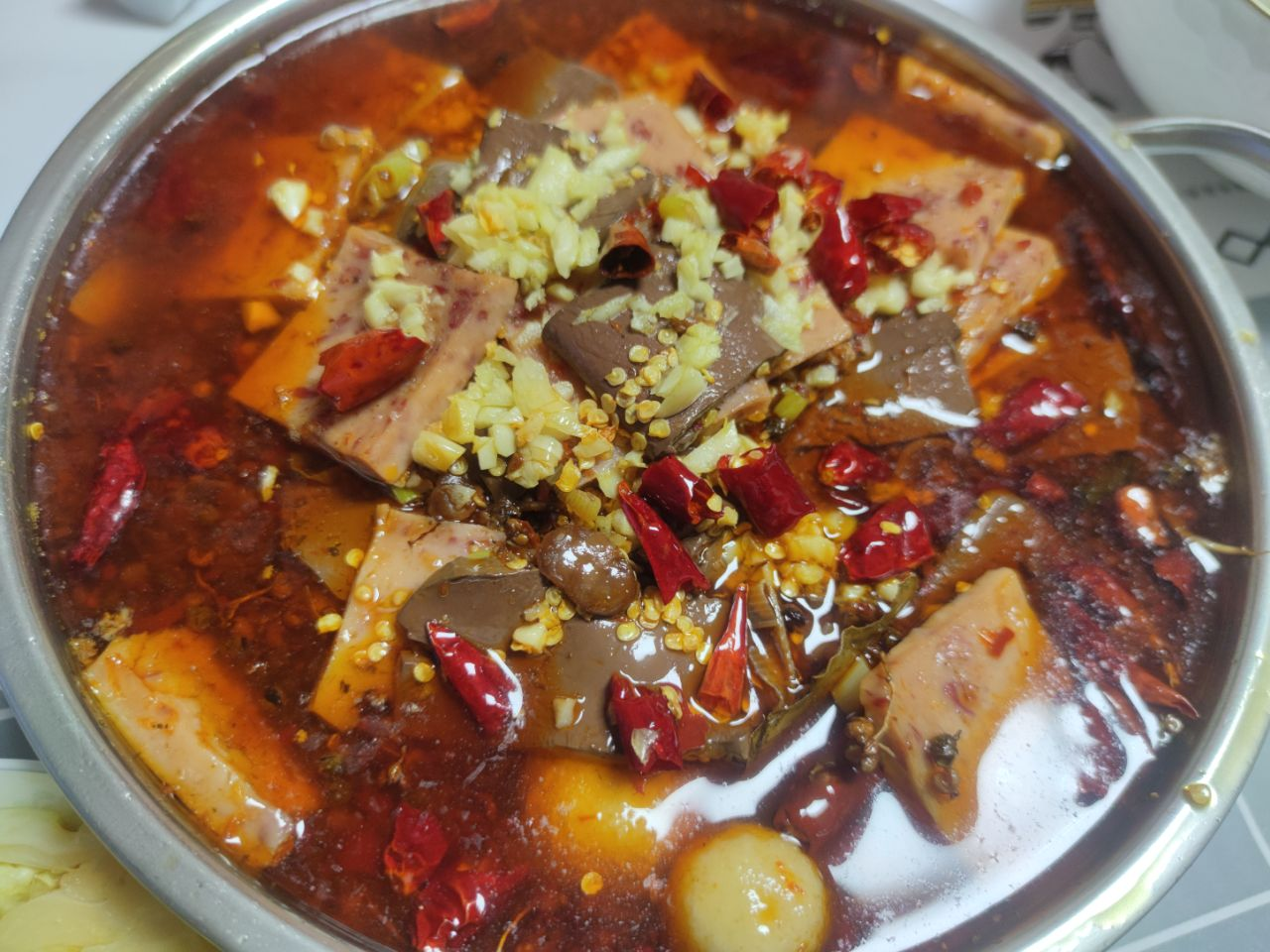
Homemade dish with lunch meat

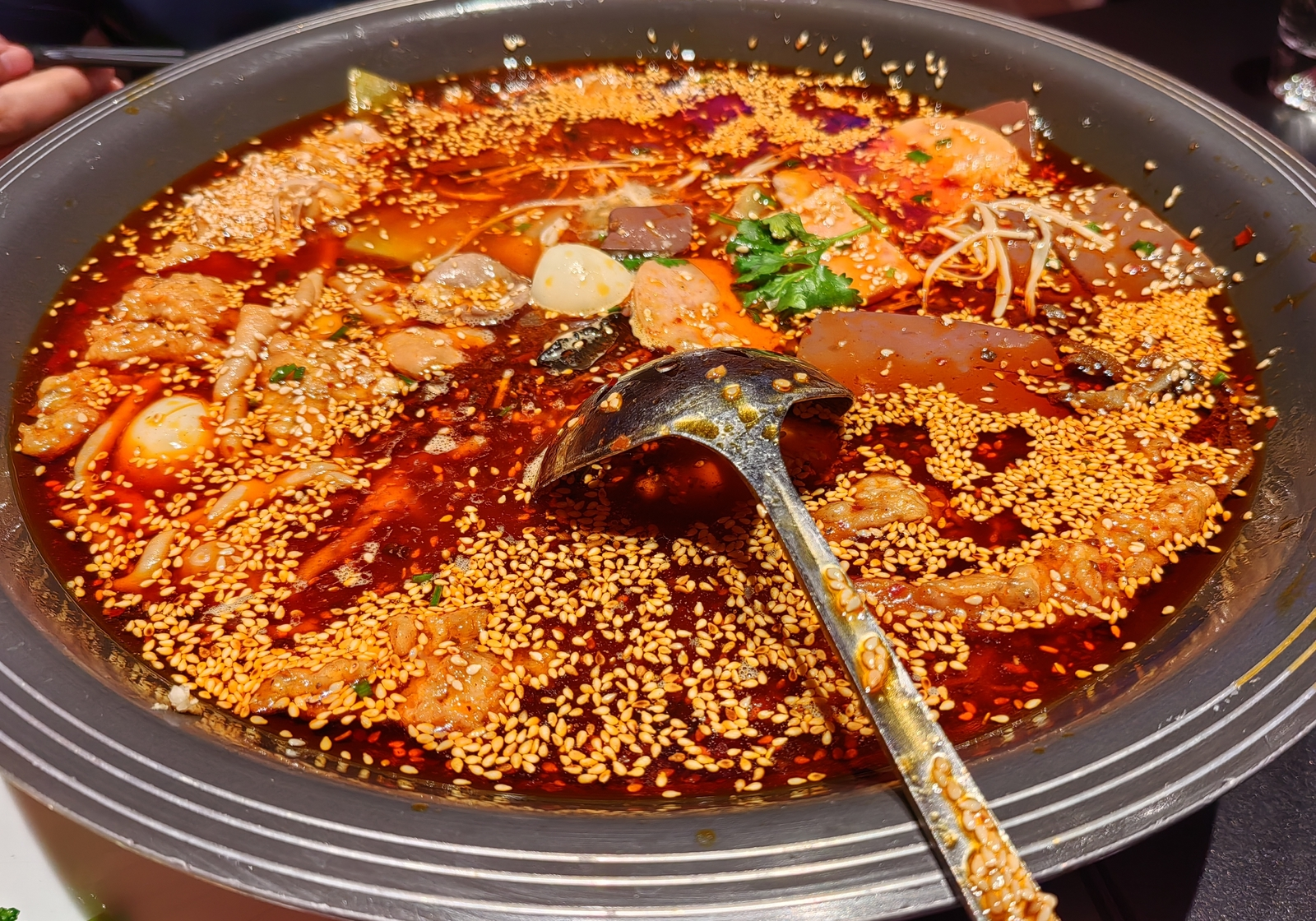
Mao xue wang with sesame seeds

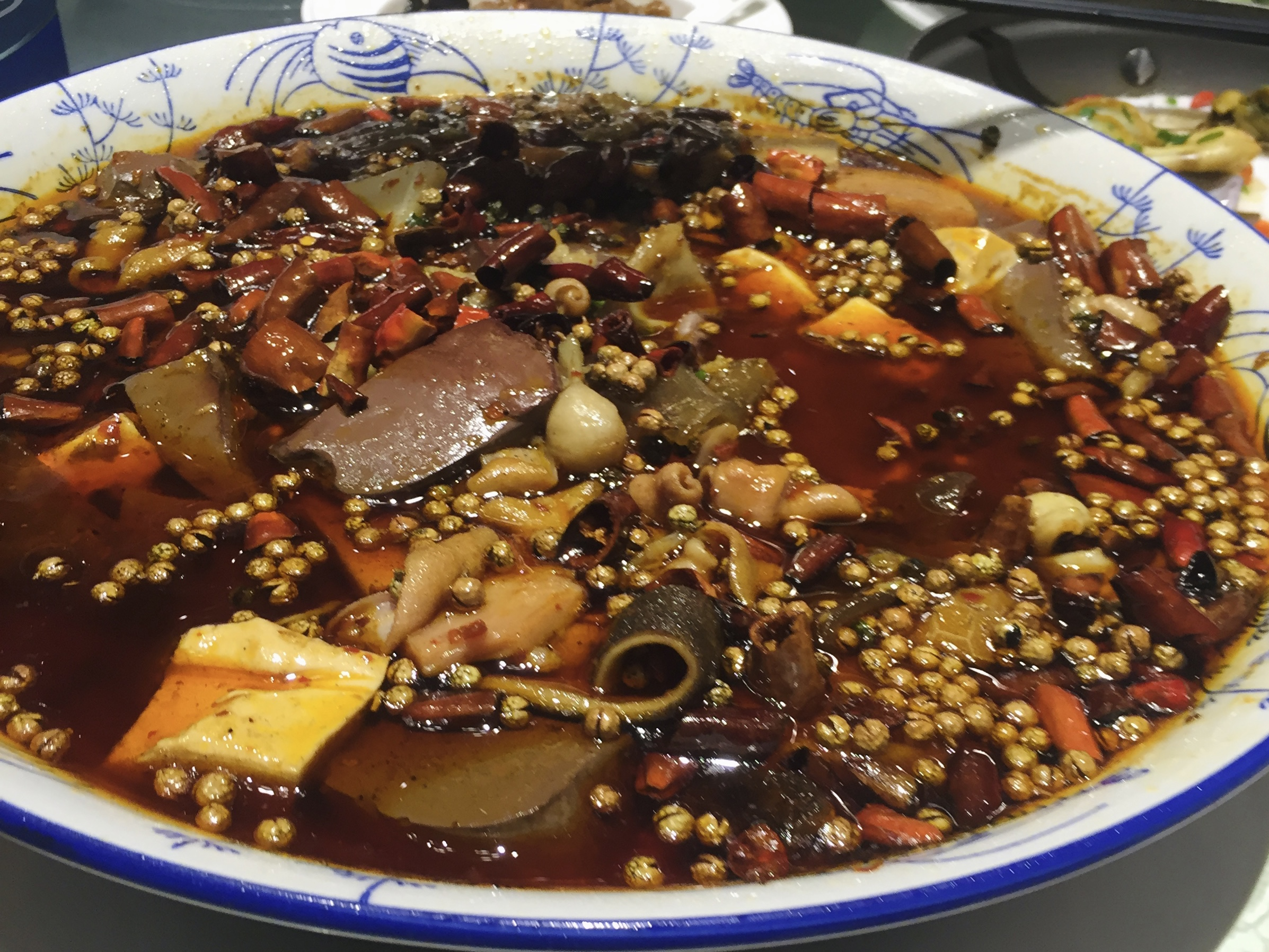

== See also ==
- Blood soup
- Chongqing hotpot
- Malatang
- Shuizhu
