= Mala hotpot =

Mala hotpot may refer to:

- Chongqing hot pot, a boiled Chinese dish
- Mala xiang guo, a stir-fried Chinese dish
