= Mala xiang guo =

Chinese dish

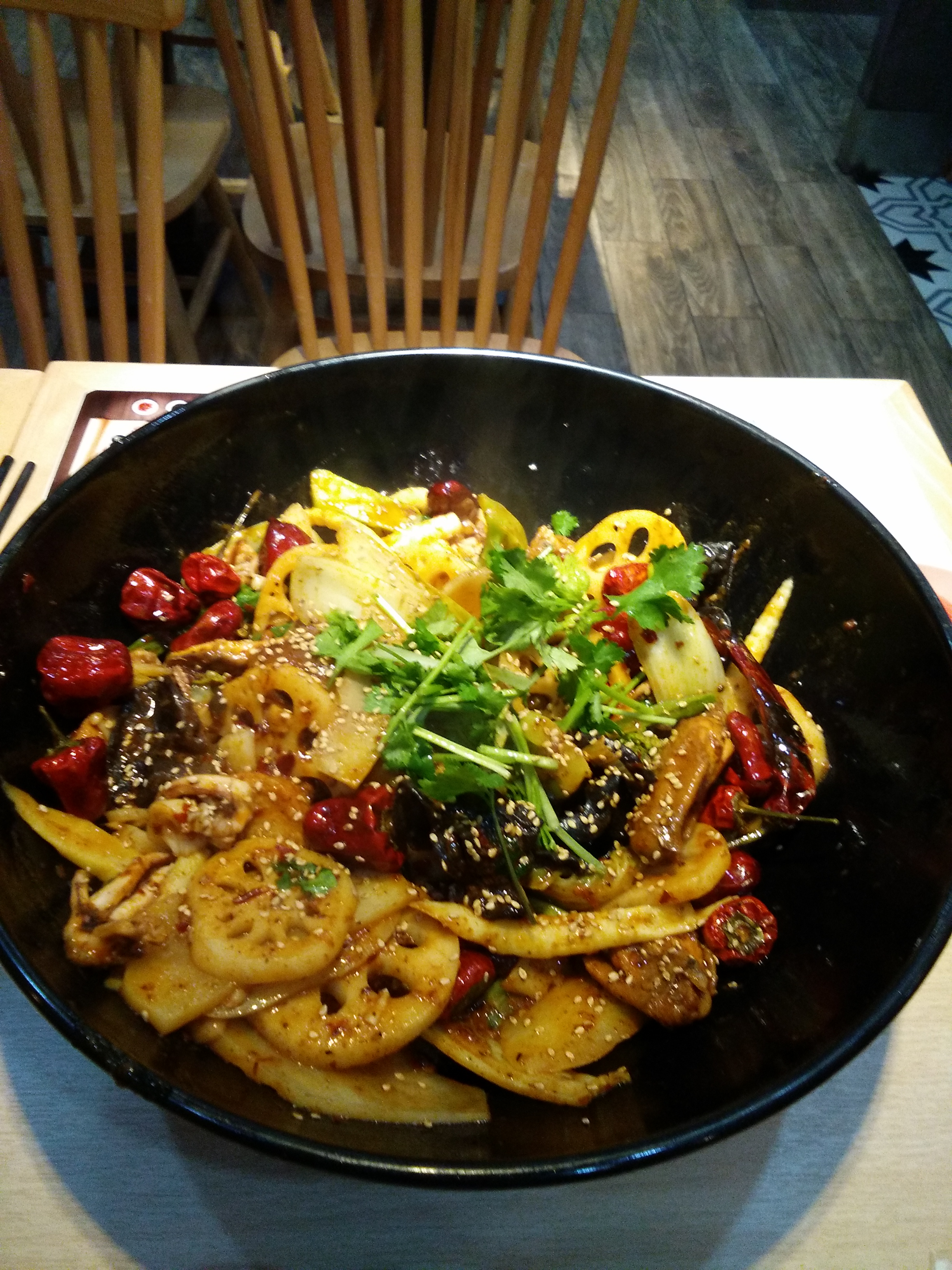
- Type: Stir-fry
- Place of origin: China
- Region or state: East Asia
- Main ingredients: Meat, seafood, vegetables, tofu, fuzhu, glass noodles

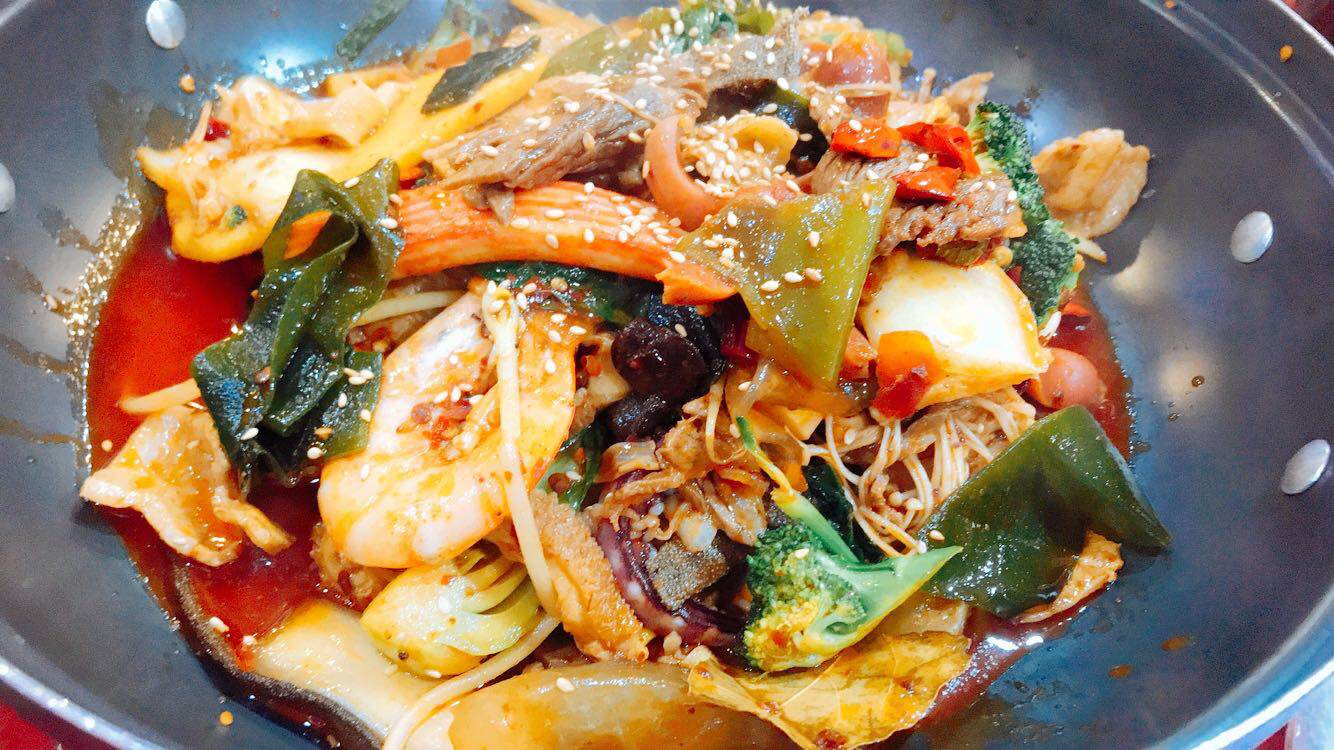
Mala xiang guo in China

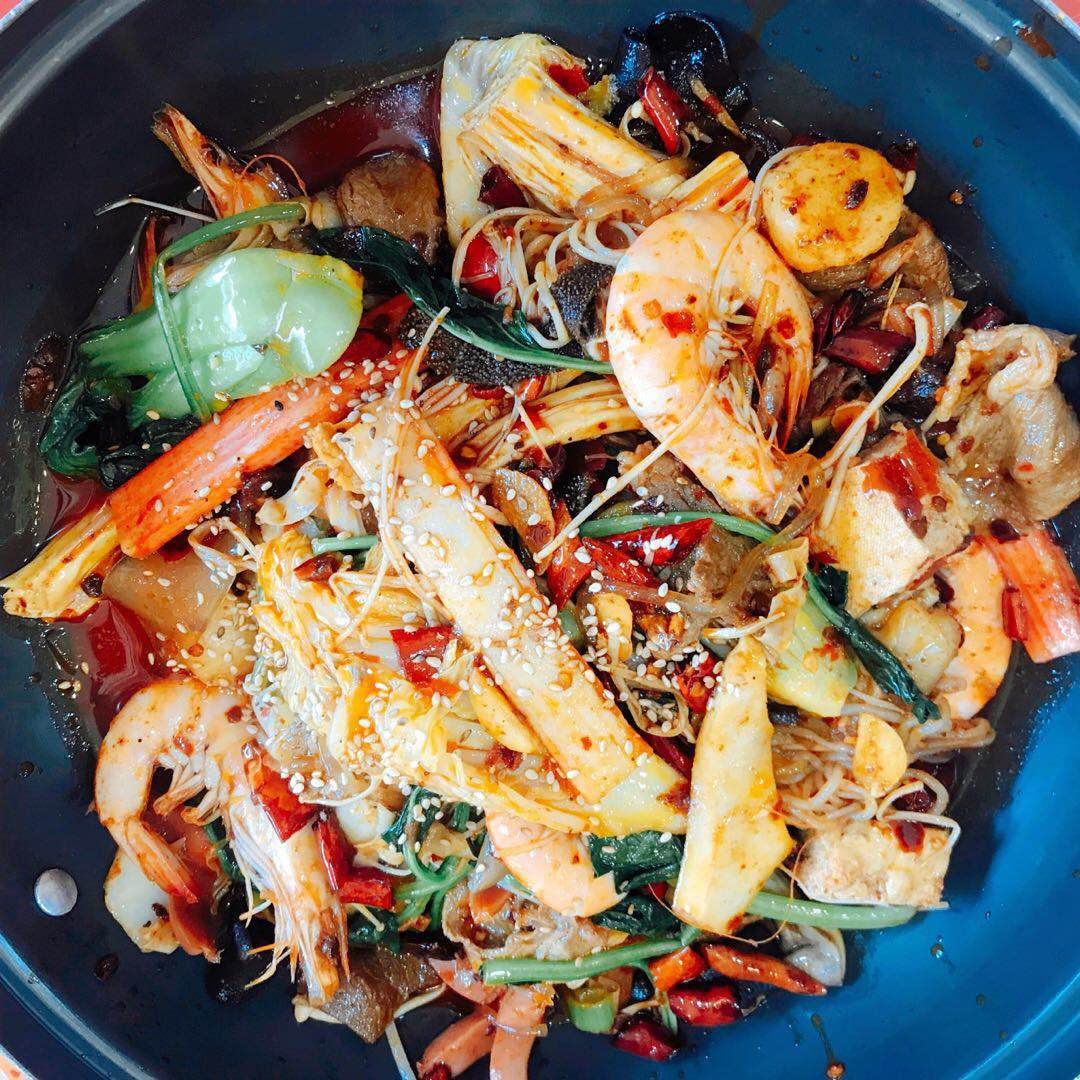
Mala xiang guo containing various seafood, meat, vegetables, fuzhu and glass noodles

Mala xiang guo (traditional Chinese: 麻辣香鍋; simplified Chinese: 麻辣香锅; pinyin: málà xiāngguō), roughly translated into English as "spicy stir fry hot pot", is a Chinese dish prepared by stir-frying. Strongly flavored with mala, it often contains meat and vegetables, and has a salty and spicy taste. The preparation process involves placing the required ingredients in the pot, stir-frying and adding seasoning. In restaurants, customers usually choose the ingredients (meat and vegetables) by themselves before the chef prepares the dish.

The fiery dish originated from the Tujia people of Jinyun Mountain in Chongqing, China in the early 2000s. The name of the dish is self-descriptive, with "ma" meaning tongue-numbing and "la" meaning spiciness. The "spicy and tingling" sensation is a distinctive flavor feature of Sichuan cuisine, which is known for its bold use of spicy ingredients. Although it is a spicy dish, it is popular all over China for its complex flavor profile and affordability.

Mala xiang guo is served as a side dish or a main course, and paired with rice or noodles or eaten on its own. Individuals can customize it to their taste preferences, adjusting the level of spiciness and adding different vegetables and meats to make it more filling or to create unique flavor combinations.

== Description and ingredients ==
The dish features a variety of vegetables, meat and seafood stir-fried together in a rich spicy sauce. Typically, it is served in a large bowl and shared family-style with steamed rice. Mala xiang guo ingredients may include potatoes, lotus root, cauliflower, mushrooms, tofu, and other vegetables, and meats including chicken, beef, pork, and meatballs.

Szechuan peppercorn is essential in mala, providing both tingling sensation and citrusy, floral taste. The dry chili pepper imparts smoky, spicy flavors and fragrance to mala xiang guo.

== History and origins ==
Mala xiang guo originated from the Tujia people in Jinyun Mountain, Chongqing, and it is a home-style dish that is commonly available locally. The dish is typically made with various seasonings in a large pot. When served to guests, variations often include the addition of meat, seafood, bamboo, and tofu skin. Recently, with its increase in popularity in China and Myanmar, mala xiang guo has expanded to include hundreds of different ingredients.

Mala’s origins can be identified in the Sichuan province of southwestern China, known for its distinctive and spicy culinary traditions. Locals like to make a simple stir-fry of vegetables with seasoning condiments. When they have visitors, they enhance the dish with meats, seafood, crunchy sausages, and fragrant, tender bamboo shoots to make mala xiang guo.

Based on both spicy and dry pot dishes, Sichuan chefs have refined mala xiang guo, making it more adaptable for restaurant operations. Sichuan cuisine comes from its strong use of spices and chili, contributing to its distinct profile. Mala tang is a popular Sichuan hot soup dish made with a variety of ingredients, including meat, seafood, vegetables, and tofu, distinguished by its pre-made broth heavily seasoned with Szechuan peppercorn and chili. Mala tang and mala xiang guo are both popular Sichuan dishes, but the main difference between them is the cooking method. Mala tang is poached in hot broth, while mala xiang guo is stir-fried. This means that mala tang is generally healthier, as it contains less oil. However, mala xiang guo is often more fragrant, as the ingredients are cooked in a wok with a variety of spices.

Mala xiang guo can be made with a variety of ingredients to suit different tastes, making it a good choice for people with different nutritional limitations and preferences. It became well-known in the 1980s and globally known in the 2000s, and is now a staple of Sichuan cuisine. Mala xiang guo restaurants are increasingly common in Southeast Asia, where mala restaurants first appeared in Singapore.

Mala xiang guo has been popularized by Sino-Myanma throughout Myanmar, where it is called mala shan gaw (Burmese: မာလာရှမ်းကော).

== Types ==
Mala xiang guo, a popular Chinese dish, typically consists of various ingredients stir-fried in a spicy, numbing sauce known as mala sauce. While it is traditionally a stir-fry dish, some variations incorporate different bases such as soup or salad.

=== Soup base ===
Mala hot pot soup originated in the Sichuan province in China. The region is well-known for its spicy cuisine, with mala hot pot soup being one of its most popular meals. According to the story, the soup was made by fishermen looking for a warm meal on a cold day. They boiled water, added herbs and spices, and created a tasty and warming soup that became a popular dish among the locals.

As time passed, the mala hot pot soup recipe became more elaborate. Nowadays, the soup comes in numerous variations with different spices and ingredients. The soup can be made with pork, beef, chicken or even vegetable base. Ingredients such as meats, seafood, mushrooms, carrots, lotus roots, leafy greens can be added based on the diner's choice. Thinly sliced meats are recommended to ensure even and swift cooking.

Common meat options for mala hot pot consist of beef (sirloin, ribeye, or flank steak), pork (shoulder or belly), and lamb (shoulder or leg); spice options include soy sauce, rice wine and garlic. Popular vegetable choices include leafy greens (spinach, napa cabbage, baby bok choy), root vegetables (carrots, lotus root) and mushrooms (shiitake, enoki, oyster mushrooms). To make the taste and texture more complete, toppings such as tofu, eggs and noodles can be used.

=== Salad base ===
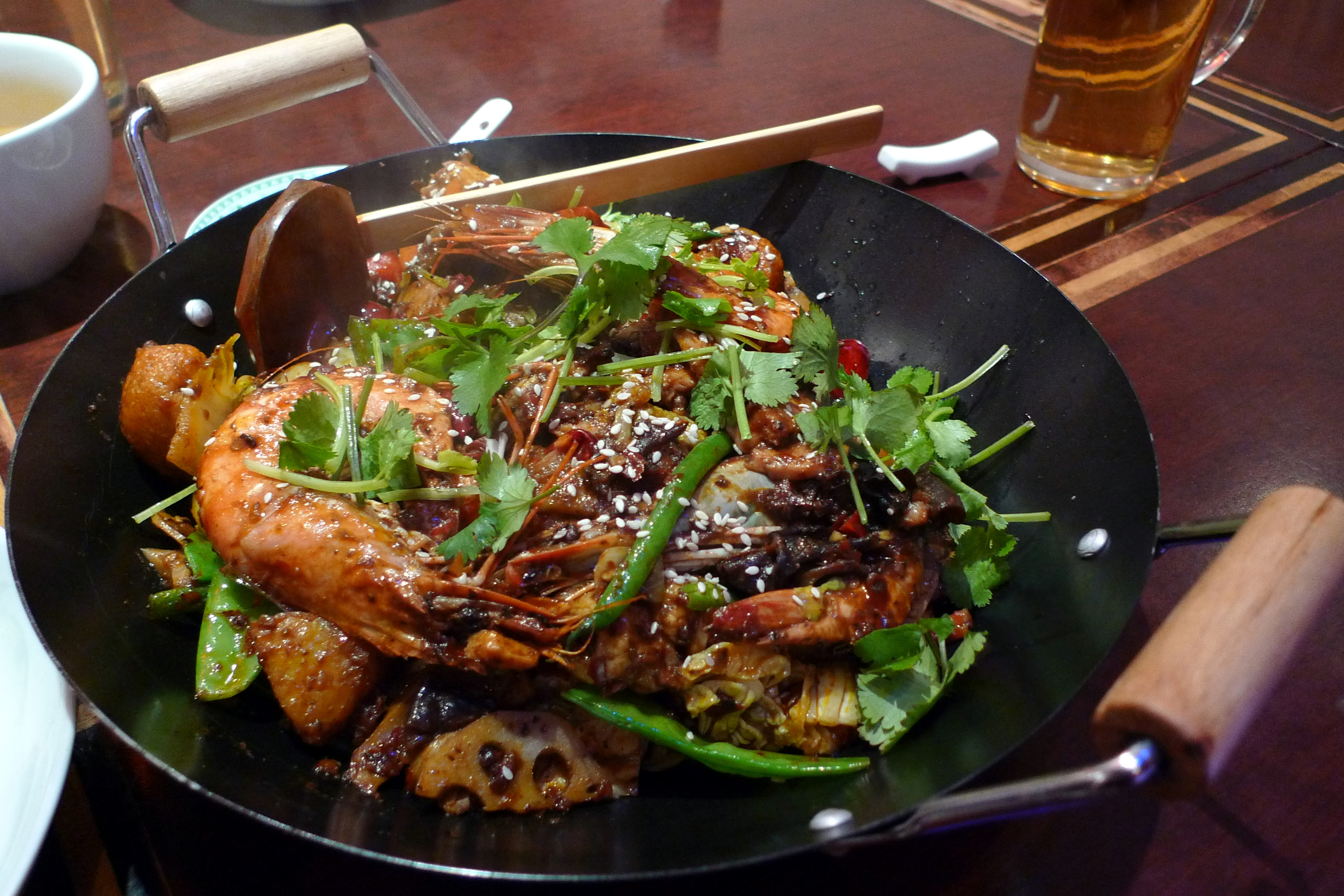
Mala xiang guo (salad base)

In recent years, there has been a widespread belief that traditional hot pot's popularity has decreased significantly, while dry hot pot has emerged as the dominant food trend. It developed the name "dry hot pot" due to the absence of a soup base, which distinguishes it from conventional Chinese mala hot pot. Mala xiang guo salad is a variation on the main dish, served as a chilled salad dressing or sauce. The salad includes tofu, vegetables, and/or cold noodles in mala dressing. Mala salad is frequently served in a shallow bowl or on a plate that emphasizes the ingredients' vibrant colours and textures. The mala dressing is poured over them to create a fiery taste.

== Regional varieties ==
In different regions, the taste of mala xiang guo varies slightly depending on local culinary preferences and ingredient choice. For instance, in Sichuan, the dish features a large use of Szechuan peppercorn and a high level of spiciness. In some locations, a milder version is available. Ingredients can also vary based on local vegetables, meats and seafoods, and traditions.

Mala xiang guo is served in a large wok. A variety of selected ingredients is stir-fried together in oil seasoned with dried red chili and Szechuan peppercorn, usually combined with onions and ginger. It is a variation on Chongqing mala hot pot. Hot pot or steamboat is widespread throughout China, with the numbingly fiery Sichuan style being the most popular.

Mala hotpot involves boiling a variety of raw ingredients in a thick broth mixed with mala seasonings.

Mala tang is a Chinese dish consisting of a variety of food items such as vegetables, meats and seafood on skewers. These are dipped into a liquid hotpot of a spicy and numbing broth made with chili, Szechuan peppercorn and various spices. It is usually garnished with sesame seeds and cilantro and is known for its flavorful taste.

Mala maocai is also a dish originating from China that involves cooking various raw items such as vegetables, meats and tofu in a hot and numbing broth. It is comparable to hot pot but has intense taste due to a mix of additional spices. The dish is popular for its fiery taste.

Mala xiang guo gained popularity not only in China but also globally, resulting in various popular shops worldwide. Different places in various countries offer their own versions of mala xiang guo.

== See also ==
- Chongqing hot pot
