= Crisp pork =

Fried pork dish

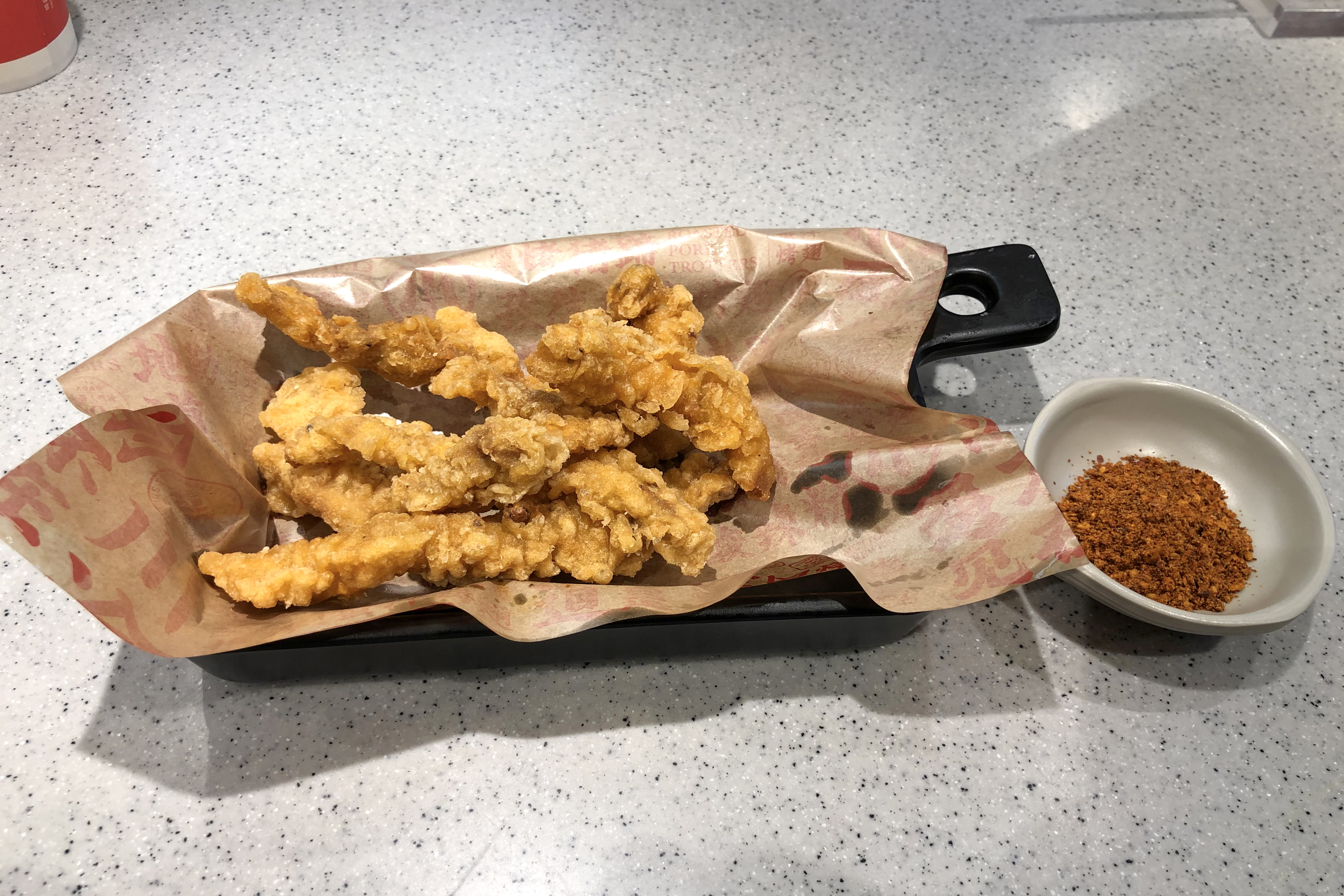
- Sichuan style crisp pork with chili powder
- Alternative names: Surou, xiaosurou
- Place of origin: China
- Main ingredients: Pork, batter

Crisp pork, surou (Chinese: 酥肉), or xiaosurou, is a common street food in China, typically consisting of fatty rib meat that is coated in an egg batter and deep-fried.

In Sichuan, it is very common to have crisp pork with hot pot. In Shanxi, crispy pork is one of the "three Shanxi-style steamed dishes". Fried purple crispy pork from Henan is a local specialty, one of the "Eight Big Bowls" in Xun County and Qi County, Hebi. Crispy pork is one of the "Nine Big Bowls" in Shaanxi. In Minnan and Taiwan, there is also pork tenderloin marinated in vinegar before frying, called "vinegar pork".

== See also ==
- Cracklings
