= Maocai =

Chinese stew-like dish

Maocai (Chinese: 冒菜; pinyin: màocài) is a stew-like dish originating from the Chinese city of Chengdu, in Sichuan. It is composed of a variety of vegetables as well as meat and/or fish in a stock made of mala sauce. Although it is similar to styles of hot pot common in this region, its chief difference lies in the fact that the ingredients are already cooked when served, and hence no simmering is done at the table.

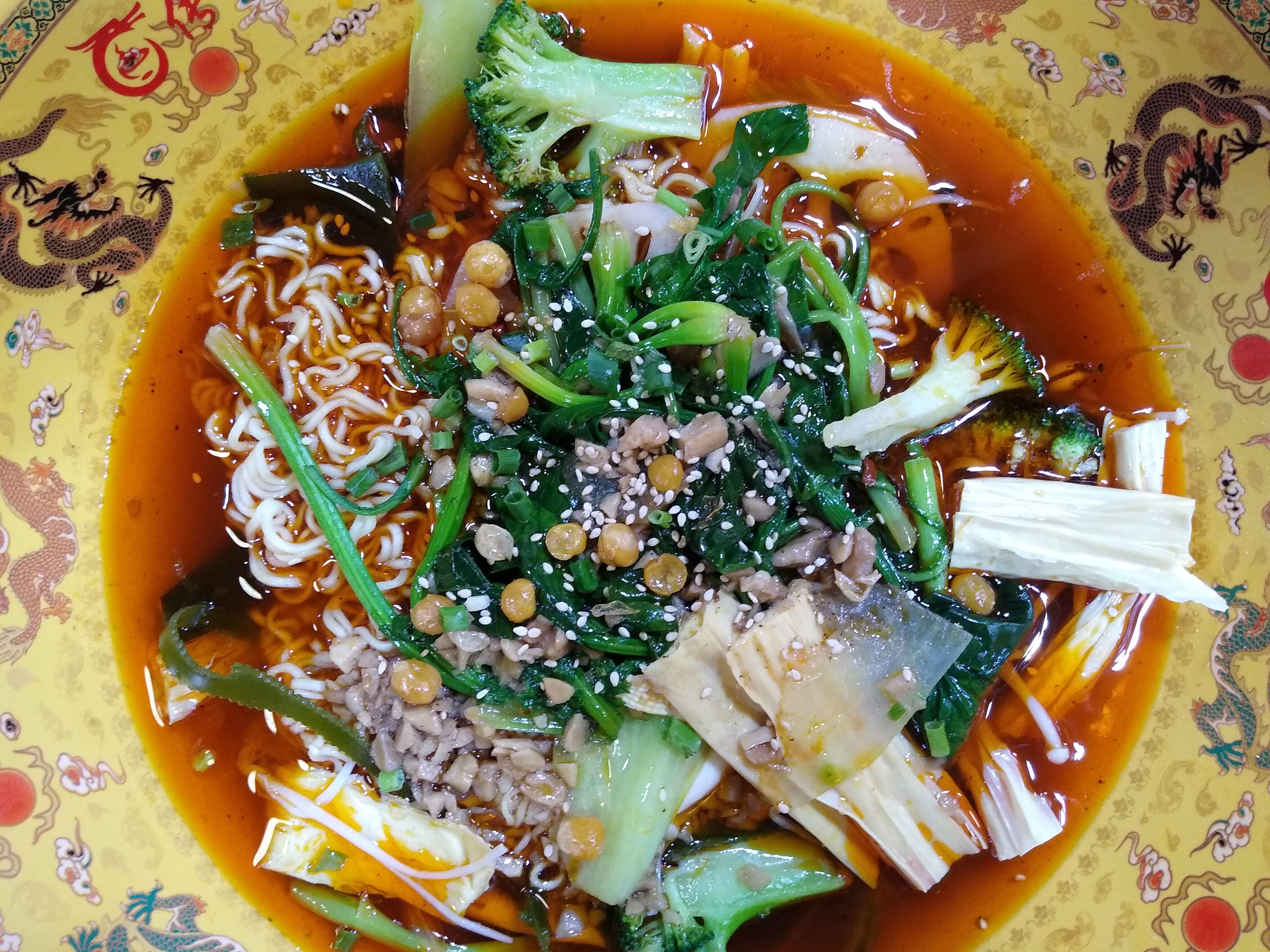
Maocai

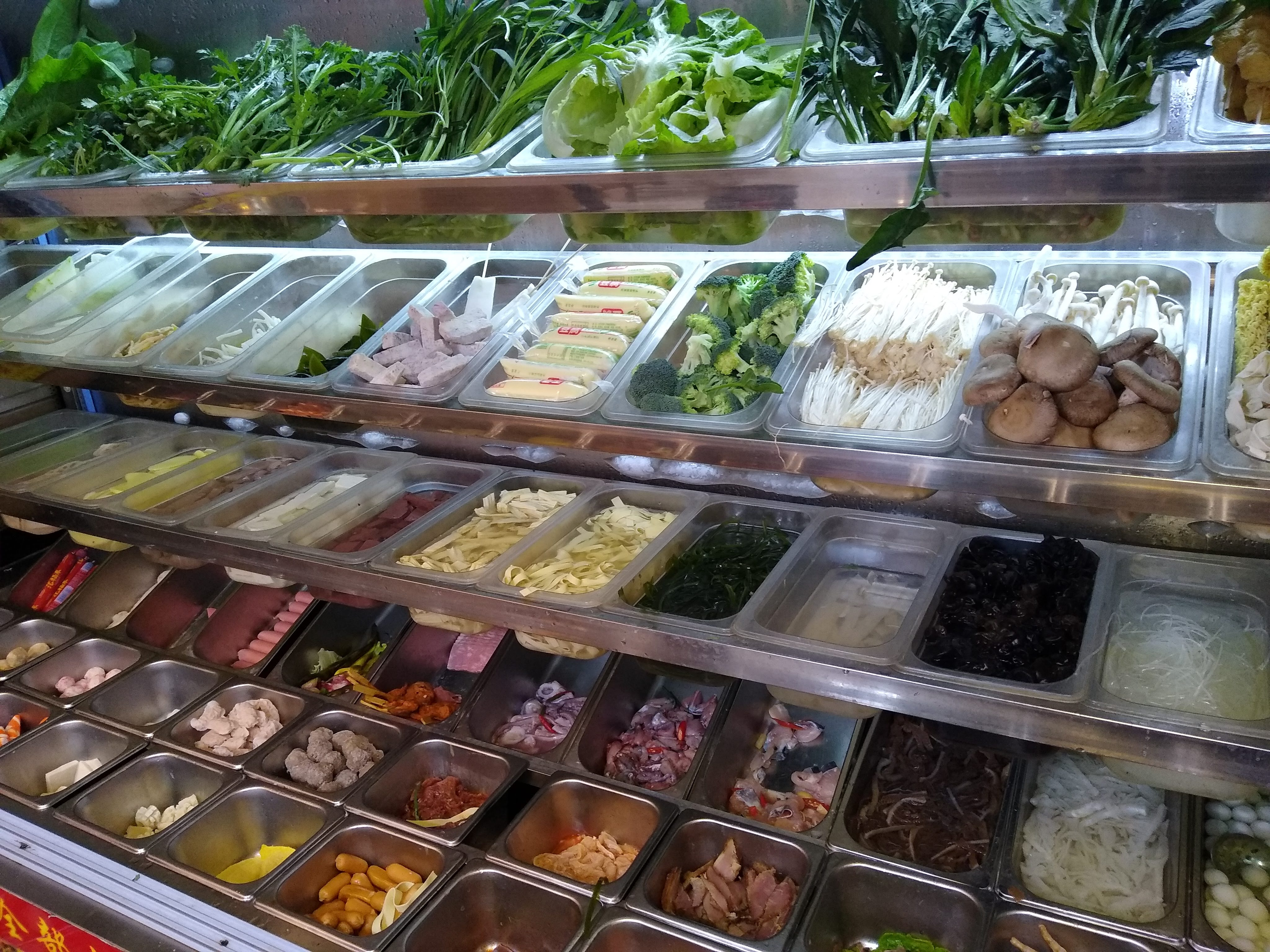
Raw vegetables and meat to be selected at a maocai restaurant

== Common ingredients ==
Although there is great variation in the ingredients used in maocai, typically any of the following vegetables are included: lotus root, potato slices, Chinese cabbage, cucumber, winter melon, cauliflower, wood ear, enoki, oyster mushrooms, seaweed, bamboo shoots, tofu, yuba, beansprouts, as well as rice vermicelli and cellophane noodles made of sweet potato starch.

The meats most frequently encountered are beef, pork and lamb, although other meats and more specific cuts may be used too.

== Preparation ==
The name maocai is derived from the verb mao (Chinese: 冒; pinyin: mào; Chengdu dialect: /mau˨˩˧/) which in Sichuanese Mandarin refers to the blanching of the ingredients in a colander in hot water by moving the colander up and down repeatedly. This pre-cooking of the ingredients before immersion in the stock sets it apart from most types of hot pot.
