= Ciqikou, Chongqing =

Town in Chongqing, China

Ciqikou 磁器口街道
- Subdistrict
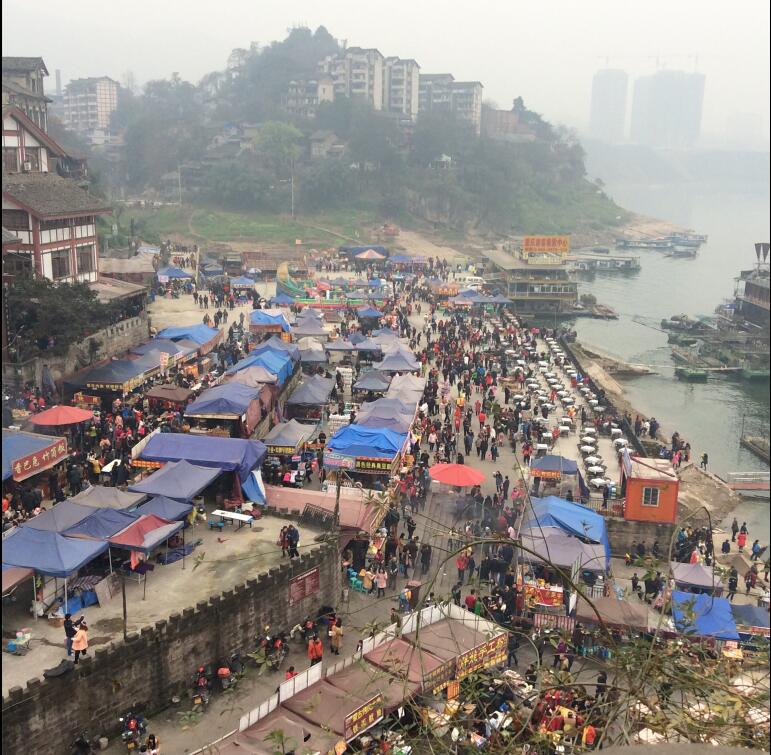
- Ciqikou crowded with people

- Location in Chongqing Ciqikou (China)
- Coordinates: 29°34′52″N 106°26′59″E
- Country: People's Republic of China
- Direct-Administered Municipality: Chongqing
- District: Shapingba District
- Time zone: UTC+8 (China Standard)

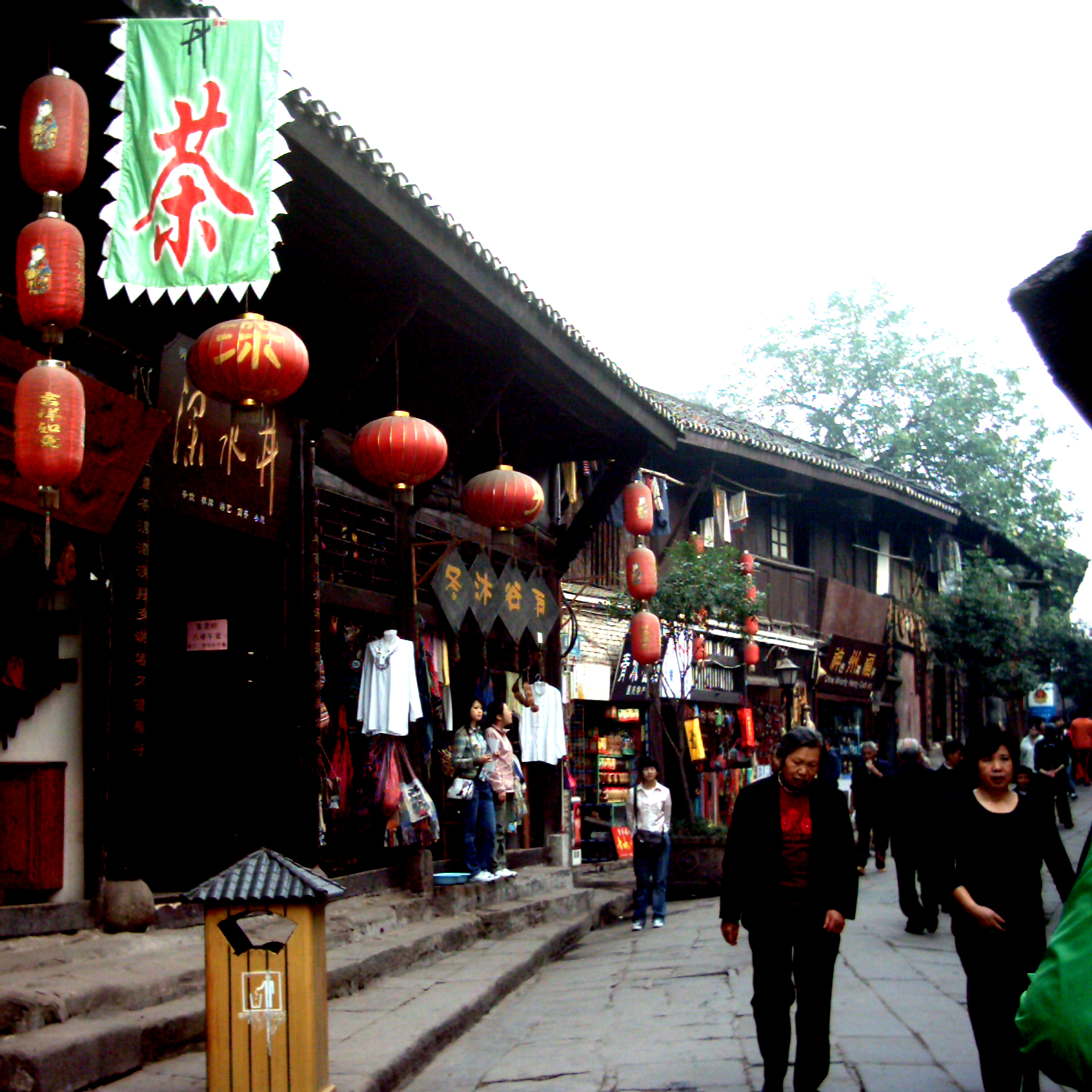
A tea house in Ciqikou

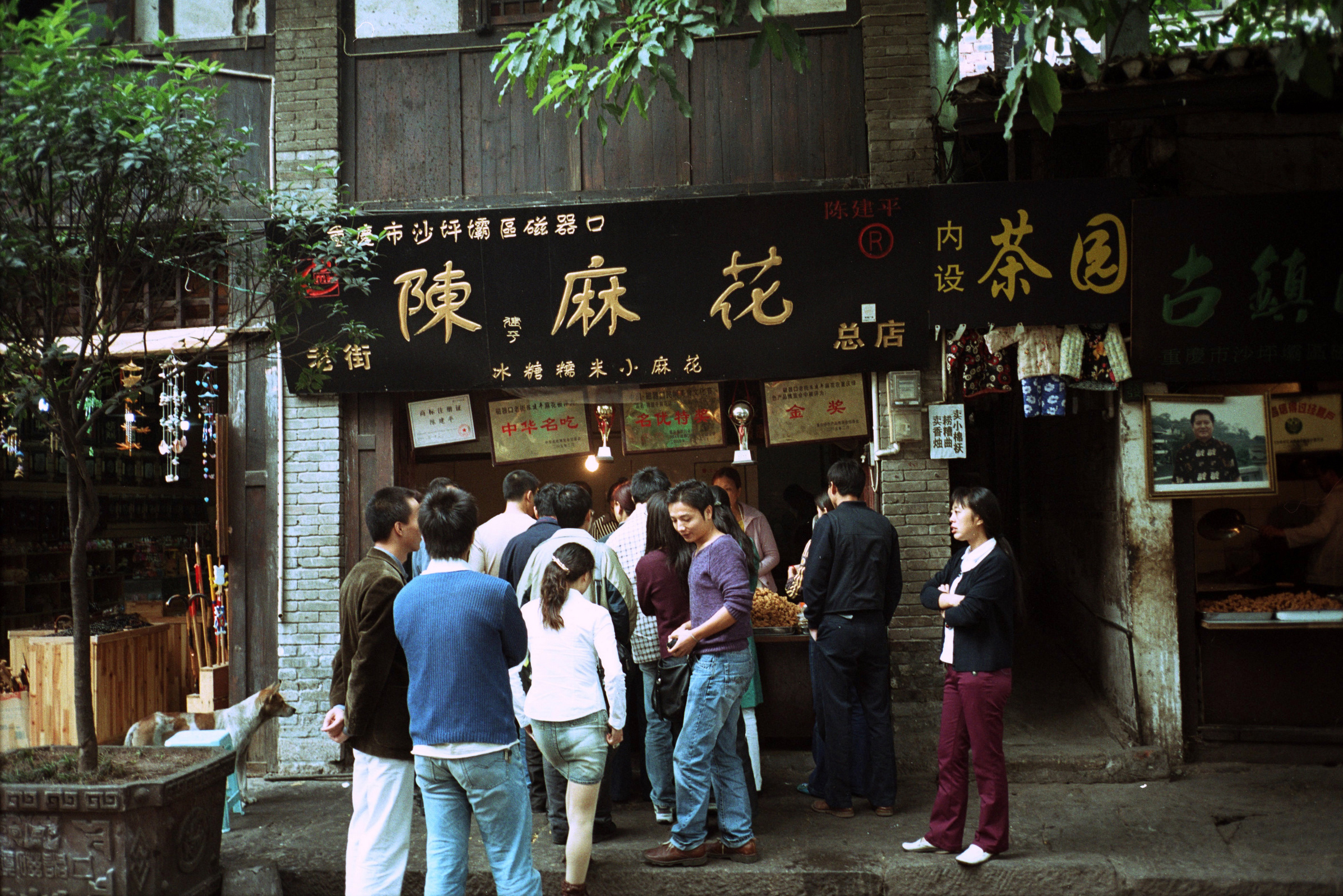
Ciqikou Dough twist shop

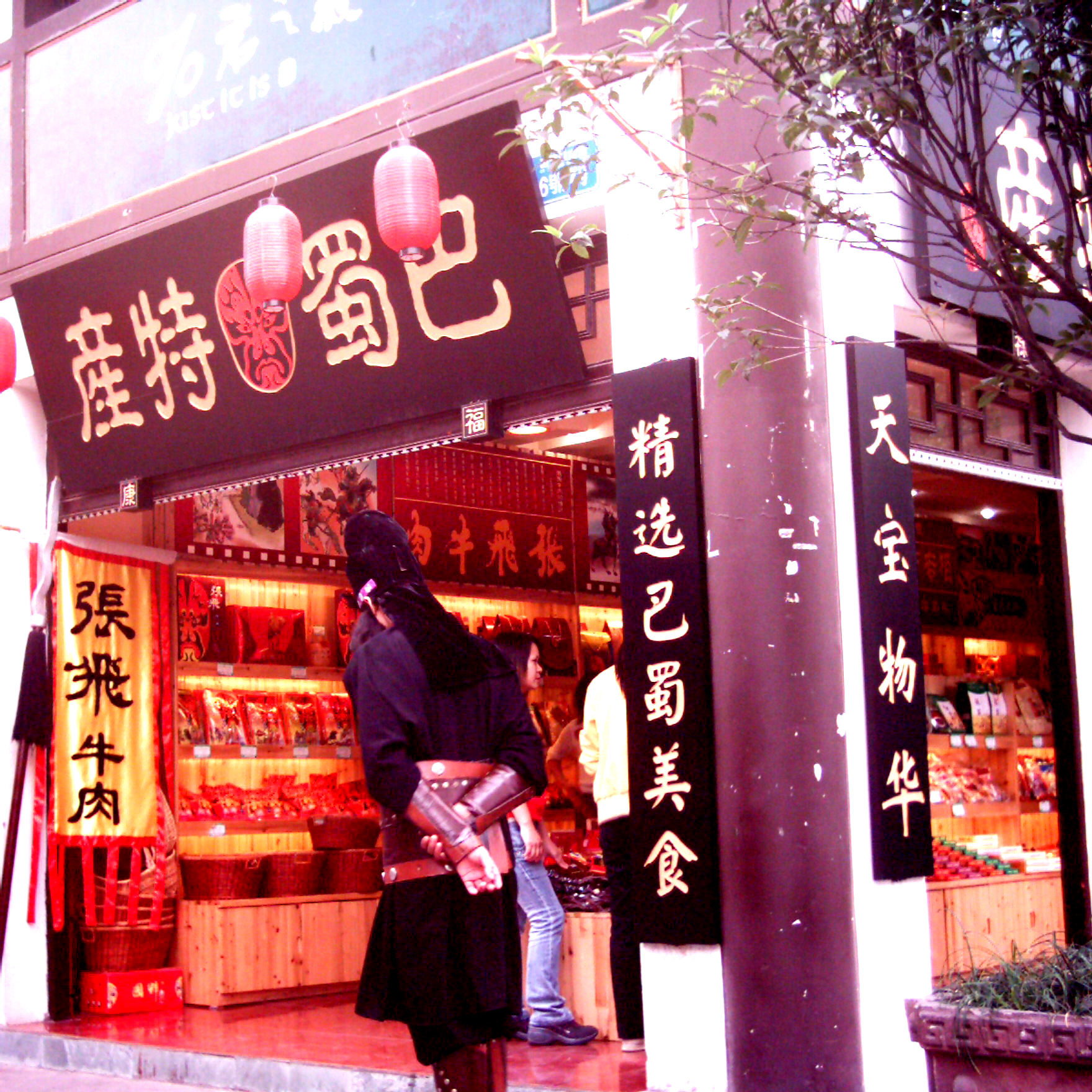
Ciqikou Zhang Fei beef jerky

Ciqikou (Chinese: 磁器口; pinyin: Cíqìkǒu; lit. 'Porcelain Port') is a subdistrict in the Shapingba District of Chongqing Municipality, People's Republic of China. It was originally called Longyin Town (simplified Chinese: 龙隐镇; traditional Chinese: 龍隱鎮; pinyin: Lóngyǐn zhèn) and was also known as Little Chongqing.

According to an old Chinese proverb: "One flagstone road, and one thousand years' Ciqikou". The name of the town can be traced back to porcelain production during the Ming (1368–1644) and Qing dynasties. Formerly a busy port located at the lower reaches of the Jialing River, a thousand years after its foundation the town remains a symbol and microcosm of old Chongqing (Jiang Zhou).

== Location ==
Ciqikou is located on the west bank of the Jialing River and covers an area of 1.18 km^{2} (0.46 sq mi). Three mountains, Mount Jingbi, Mount Fenghuang and Mount Ma'an lie in Ciqikou, whilst Fenghuang Quan and Qinshui Quan run across it. The geography of Ciqikou is considered to have perfect Fengshui by the local people.

== History ==
According to historical records, Ciqikou was first built during the reign of Emperor Zhenzong of Song (r. 998–1004). It gained prominence during the Ming dynasty as a commercial port and market town, shipping goods both by land and water. Reaching its climax during the end of the Qing dynasty, the town has been described poetically, in Ciqikou, as "one thousand people greet each other during day ... ten thousand lamps flicker at night".

== Ciqikou today ==
Travelers to Chongqing and locals alike throng to Ciqikou's steep and narrow pedestrian streets. Shops sell porcelain, other handicrafts, and gifts, while restaurants and tea shops give visitors a look at what many areas of Chongqing were like before the metropolis became the vast urban agglomeration it is today. A 1,500-year-old Buddhist temple straddles the mountain in the middle of the old town.

Ciqikou is the source of Baci culture. Many well-known people lived here during the Second Sino-Japanese War, including Guo Moruo, Xu Beihong, Feng Zikai, Fu Baoshi, Ba Jin, Bing Xin, etc. Ding Zhaozhong, a Chinese-born American scientist, studied here for many years during his childhood.

== Customs ==
The ancient town abounds in customs, many of which have lasted till now. These include baibazi, xingbang, family's ancestral temple, Pao Brother, temple fair, dragon dance, dragon boat race, friends of Sichuan opera, chuntai drama as well as pingshu and teahouse culture.

== Food ==
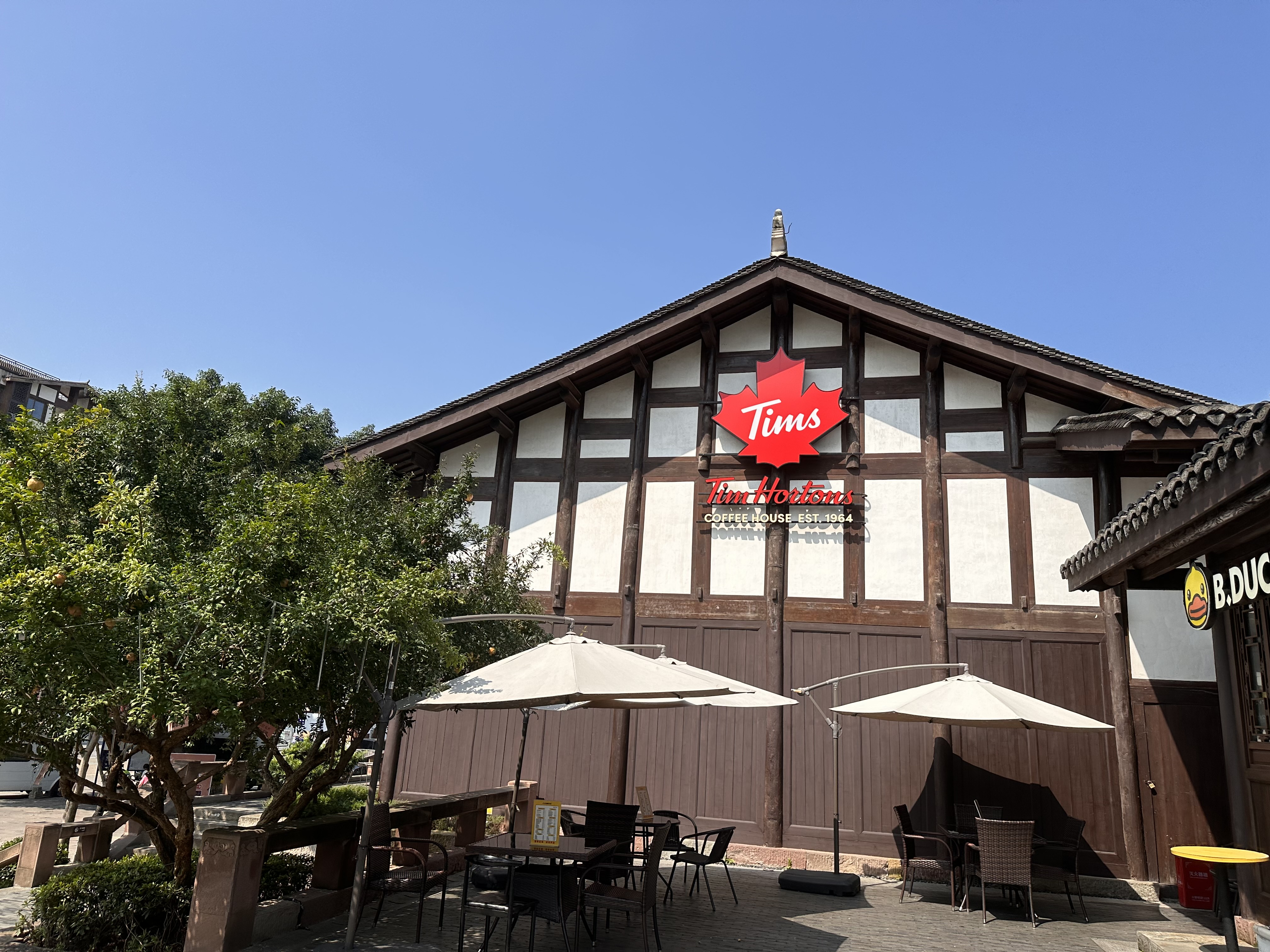
Tim Hortons in Ciqikou

Chongqing is known for its wide variety of local food traditions, especially the ubiquitous, spicy "hotpot"; while Ciqikou is one of the best-known places in Chongqing. Jiaoyan Peanut, Maoxuewang, and Qianzhangpi, called the three treasures of Ciqikou, as well as Douban fish, are the most popular.

== Landmarks ==
- Compound of Zhong's (pinyin: zhōng jiā yuàn)

This compound is more than 120 years old. It was built by a late Qing dynasty eunuch by the name of Zhong Yunting (钟云亭; Zhōng Yúntíng), who served on the staff of the notorious Empress Dowager Cixi of the Qing dynasty. Traditional Chinese architectural designs used in both the North and the South are featured in this heritage compound.

- Bayu Dwellings Collection (巴渝居民馆; bāyú jūmínguǎn)

Visitors walking through the yard and courtyard can see Bayu Dwellings, built of timber, stone and brick.

- Bao Lun Buddhist Temple (宝轮寺; Bǎolún sì)

The Jianwen Emperor of the Ming dynasty spent the rest of his life living at this temple after he was ousted from Beijing and went into exile. The four large Chinese characters "大雄宝殿" (dà xióng bǎo diàn) hanging on this temple were written by Zhao Puchu (赵朴初; Zhào Pǔchū), a famous Chinese calligrapher who served as the president of China's Buddhist Society. The main building at the temple was built 600 years ago during the Ming dynasty and is characterized by its splendor. The whole building was constructed without using a single nail and is regarded as a miracle in China's architectural history. Buddhist believers flock to this temple to pray and undertake other Buddhist activities year in year out, particularly during China's Spring Festival.

- Han Lin Academy (翰林学院; hàn lín xué yuàn)

The Han Lin Academy in Ciqikou used to be a school, operated by a sun family during the Qing dynasty. The family's offspring studied there, and three of them, including two other students, were awarded the Qing dynasty regime in recognition of their outstanding performance in a national examination organized by the Qing dynasty's Ministry of Education. In large part due to this reputation, the Han Lin Academy in Ciqikou brought together many local academics and students at the time.

== See also ==
- Ciqikou Station (Chongqing)
- List of township-level divisions of Chongqing
