= Chongqing noodles =

Spicy noodle dish from Chongqing, China

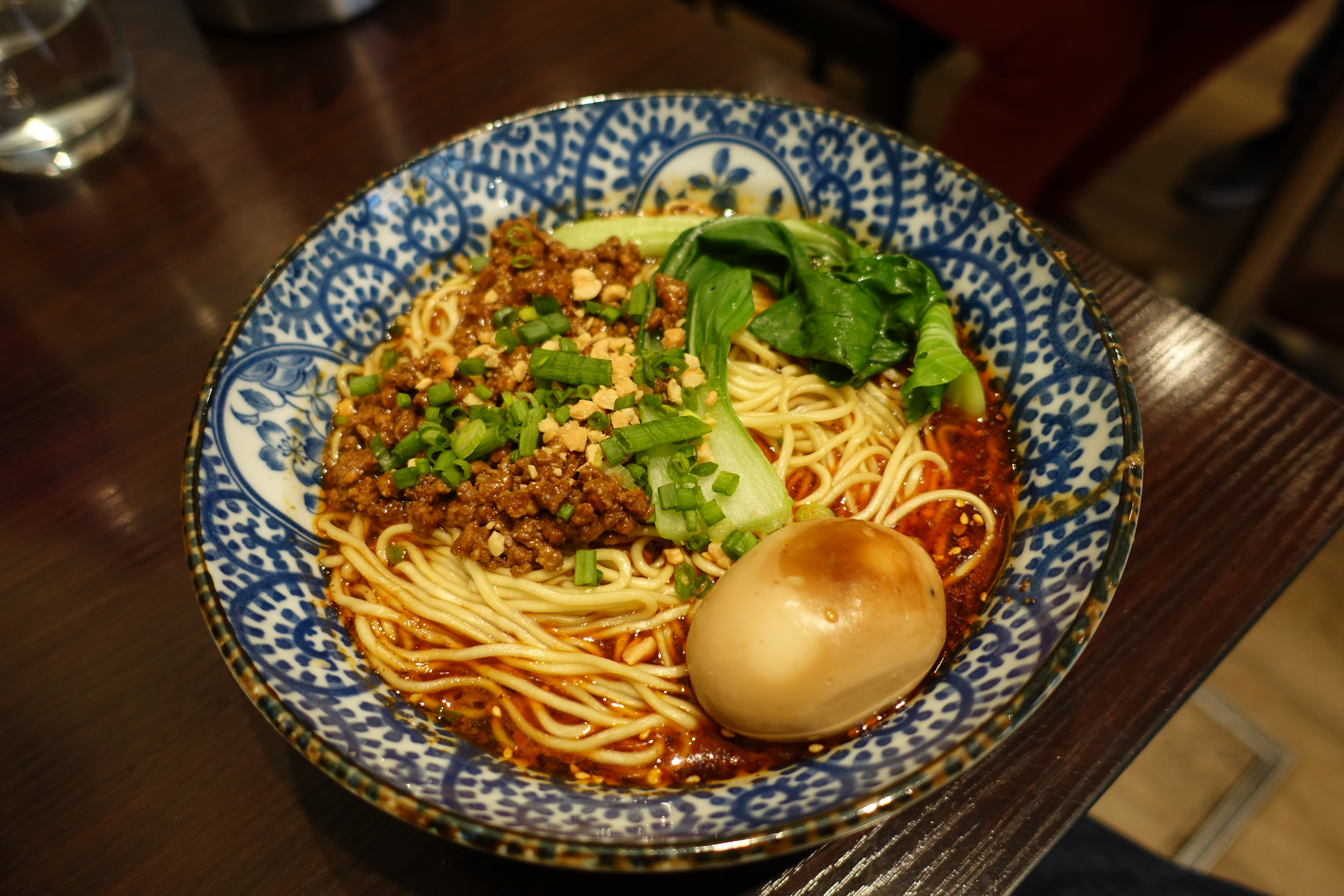
Chongqing noodles with added tea egg at a restaurant in Paris

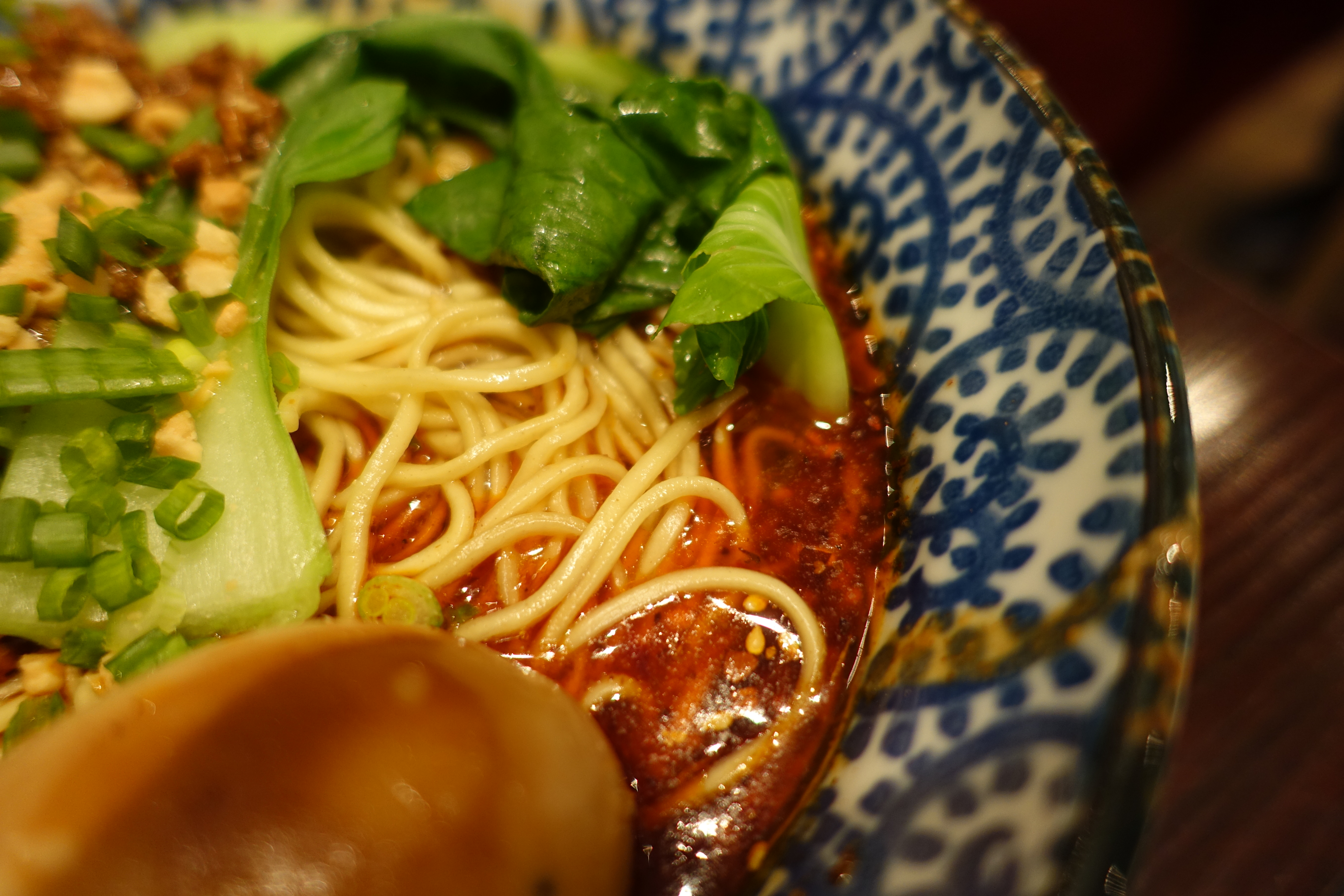
Close-up view of Chongqing noodles at a Paris restaurant

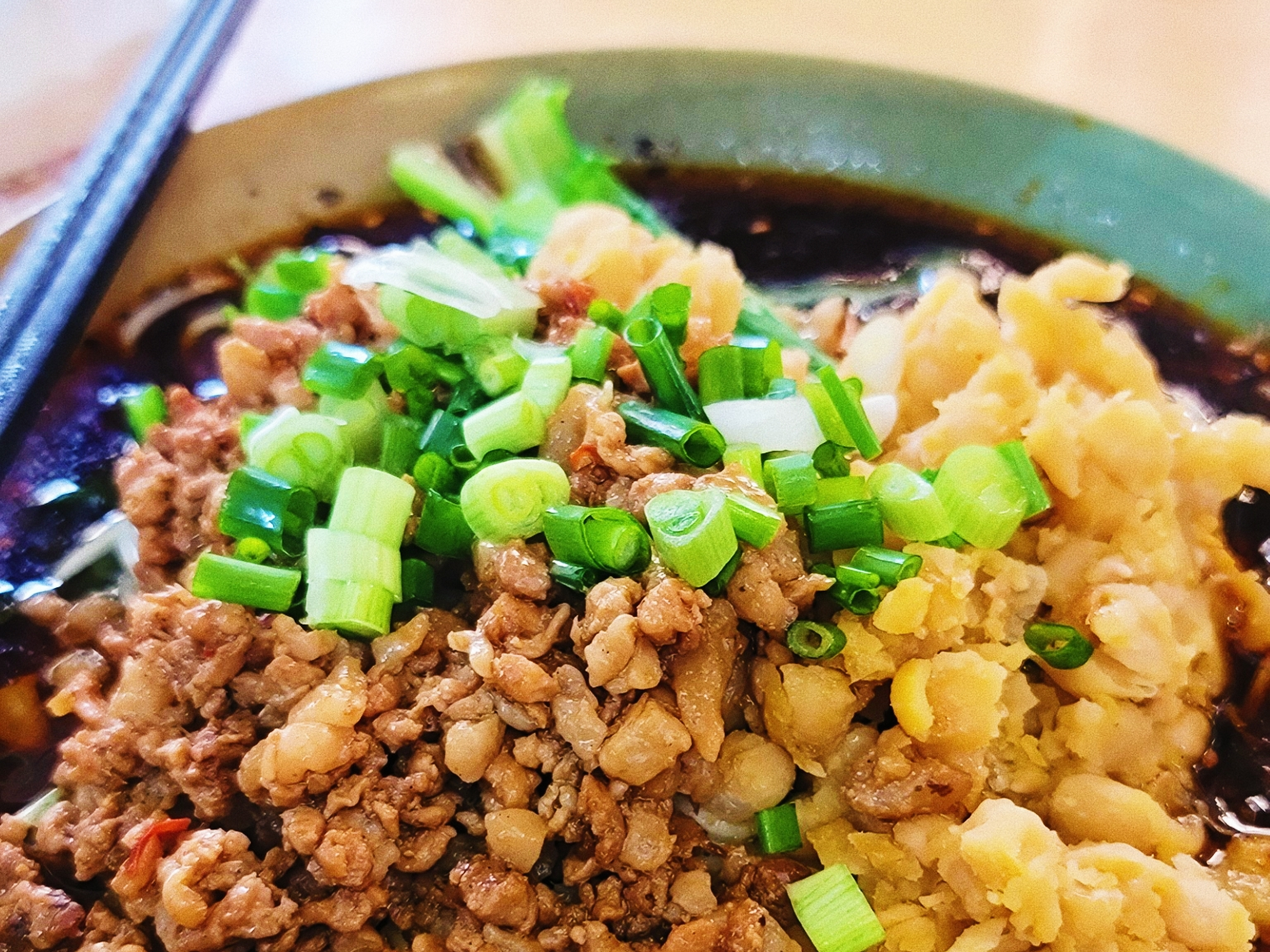
Pea noodles (重庆豌杂面; Chóngqìng wān zá miàn)

Chongqing noodles (simplified Chinese: 重庆小面; traditional Chinese: 重慶小麵; pinyin: Chóngqìng xiǎomiàn) is a term for a variety of spicy noodle dishes that originated and exist in Chongqing, China, which are collectively referred to as xiǎomiàn, literally "little noodles" in English. Xiao mian is also prepared in other areas of the world, such as the United Kingdom and areas of Australia and the United States.

== Overview ==
Xiao mian is a traditional breakfast dish in Chongqing that is widely consumed by Chongqing residents. The dishes are typically low-priced, and are a common street food in Chongqing. It has been described as a staple food of Chongqing, and is an historic part of the cuisine there. It is widely available in Chongqing restaurants.

Xiao mian noodles are typically prepared using wheat. There are two main types of xiao mian dishes: noodles with soup and noodles without soup. Chongqing noodle dishes are typically spicy and prepared using a variety of spices, seasonings and sauces. Sichuan pepper is often used in the dish's preparation. Myriad meats and vegetables are also used in its preparation. Various garnishes and condiments are also used, such as spring onions and chili oil.

== See also ==
- A Bite of China
- Chinese cuisine
- Chinese noodles
- Chongqing hot pot
- Dandan noodles
- List of Chinese dishes
- List of noodle dishes
- List of street foods
- Noodle soup
- Sichuan cuisine
