= Mala (seasoning) =

Spicy Chinese seasoning

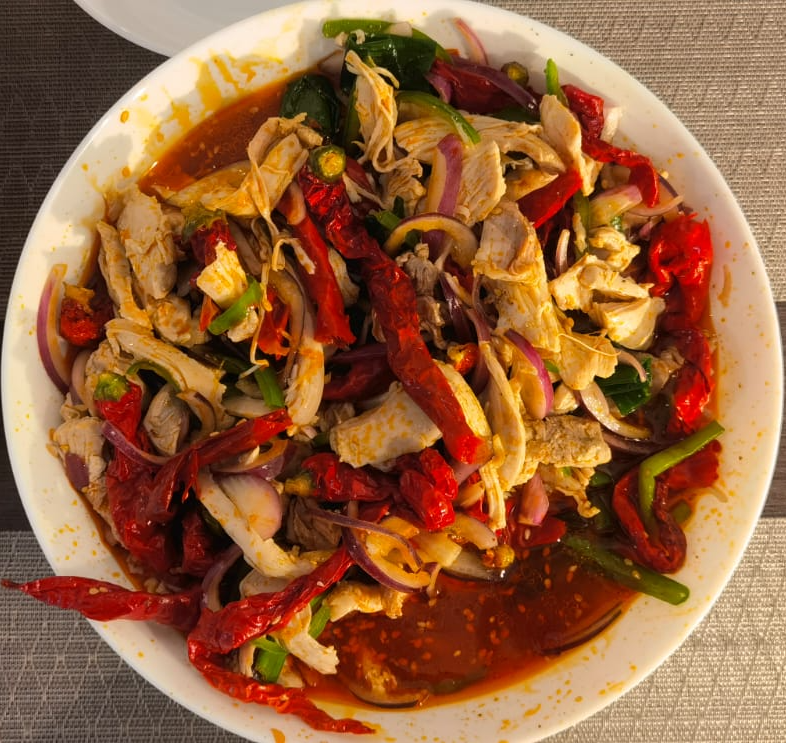
- Jiāomájī (椒麻雞), cold chicken julienne flavored with mala
- Chinese: 麻辣
Transcriptions
Standard Mandarin
- Hanyu Pinyin: málà
- Wade–Giles: ma^{2}-la^{4}
- IPA: [mǎlâ]
Yue: Cantonese
- Yale Romanization: màah-laaht
- Jyutping: maa4-laat6
- IPA: [ma˩.lat̚˨]

Mala is a numbing and pungent seasoning derived from Sichuan peppercorn and chili. Most commonly, mala is made into a sauce (麻辣醬 málàjiàng) by simmering it in oil and other spices. Characteristic of Sichuan cuisine, particularly Chongqing cuisine, it has become one of the most popular and synthesized ingredients in Chinese cuisine.

== Etymology ==
The term málà is a combination of two Chinese characters: "numbing" (麻) and "spicy (piquant)" (辣), referring to the feeling in the mouth after eating the sauce.

The numbness is caused by its characteristic Sichuan pepper, which contains 3% hydroxy-alpha-sanshool.

== History ==
The precise origins of the dish are unclear, but many sources attribute its development to night markets in Chongqing that targeted pier workers in the 19th to 20th century. Its strong flavors and oils helps preserve foods and mask the unpopular smells of blood and offal.

Despite the strong flavor by itself, various dipping sauces are often served to make the texture of cooked meat smooth and oily, and the tastes more complex. Common sauces include sesame oil with garlic, oyster oil, or fermented soybean curd (doufu ru).

The sauce is used in a variety of ways, from stir-fry, stews, and soup, to being used in hotpot or as a dipping sauce. In the Sichuan and Yunnan provinces mala powder (麻辣粉; pinyin: málàfĕn) is used on snacks and street foods, such as stinky tofu, fried potatoes, and barbecued meat and vegetables.

== Ingredients ==
The sauce is made primarily of dried chili peppers, chili powder, broad bean paste, Sichuan peppercorn, clove, garlic, star anise, black cardamom, fennel, ginger, cinnamon, salt and sugar. These ingredients are simmered with beef tallow and vegetable oil for many hours, and packed into a jar. Other herbs and spices, such as sand ginger, Angelica dahurica and poppy seeds, can be added to create a unique flavor profile.

Traditionally, a restaurant hired a chef specializing in making this sauce; the recipes were kept secret to the chef himself. Today, prepared mala sauce can easily be found in supermarkets, and chain restaurants often produce their own sauce on a large scale, while many others still blend their own. Like curry, there is a constant debate about the 'best' recipe and numerous variations are available on the market.

== Dishes ==
Mala sauce is used in many dishes.

- Malatang (麻辣燙): vegetable and meat skewers served in a mala soup. For home preparation, bouillon-style cubes of instant mala have become popular.
- Mala Hot pot (麻辣火鍋)
- Mala shaokao (麻辣燒烤): mala barbecue
- Mala xiang guo (麻辣香鍋): mala stirfry
- Mala duck neck (麻辣鴨脖子)
- Mouthwatering chicken (口水雞): Chicken cold cuts in mala sauce
- Fuqi feipian (夫妻肺片): beef tendon, tongue, tripe, and sometimes also lung, served with oily mala sauce
- Dapanji (大盤雞, lit. "big plate chicken"): a hearty chicken, potato and noodle stew flavored with mala

== See also ==
- Mapo tofu
