= Chongqing hot pot =

Chinese hot pot dish

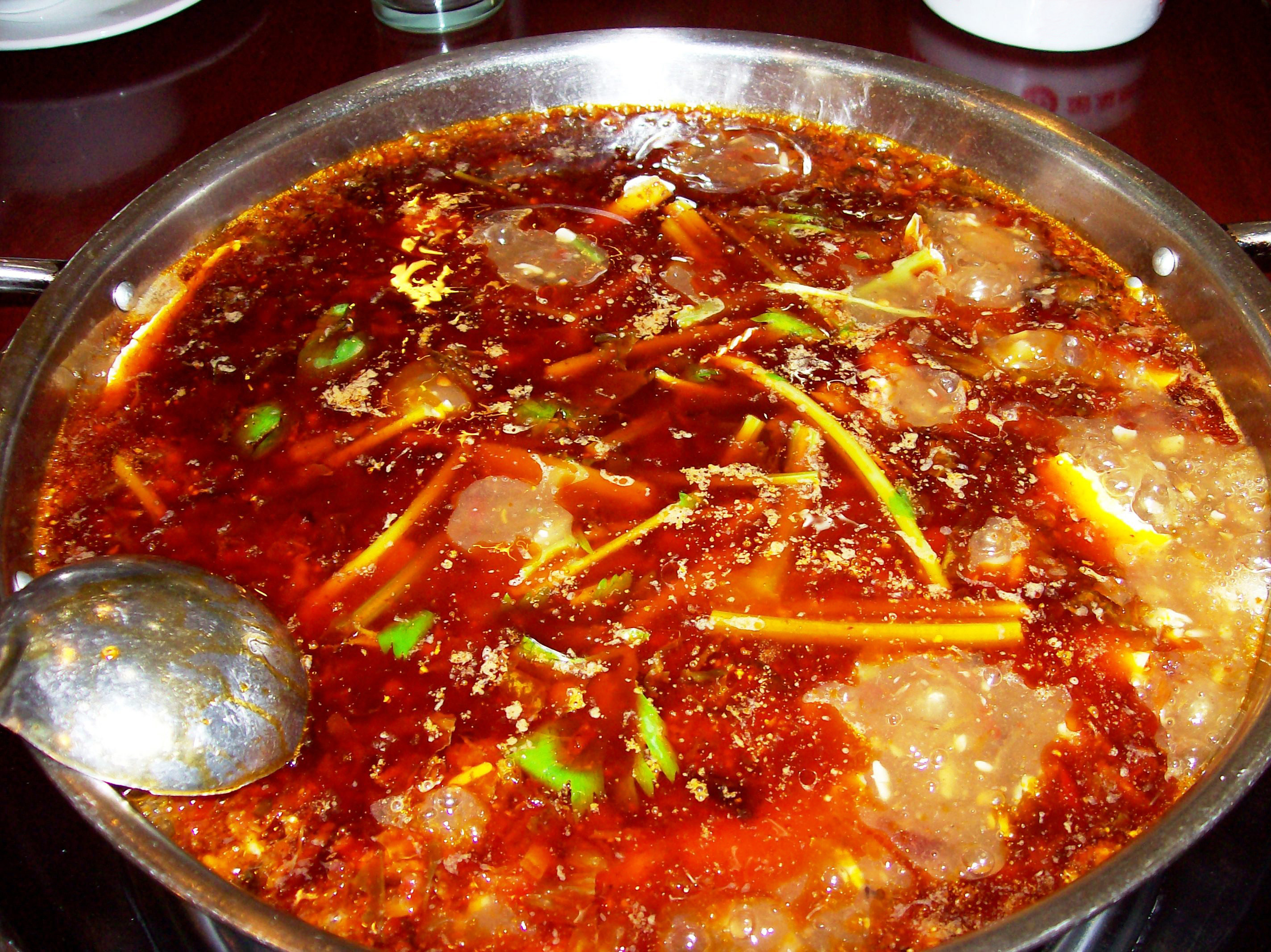
A Chongqing hot pot

Chongqing hot pot (simplified Chinese: 重庆火锅; traditional Chinese: 重慶火鍋; pinyin: Chóngqìng huǒguō), also known as spicy hot pot or mala hotpot, is usually eaten at restaurants, but otherwise is similar to roadside malatang. Chongqing hot pot is similar to the dry stir-fried mala xiang guo (麻辣香锅) which is also eaten in restaurants.

The traditional way of preparing and eating this style of dish is to put the food in a hot pot, wait for the food to cook, and when the food is ready, dip the pieces in sesame oil and eat them. People choose various kinds of food to prepare in Chongqing hot pot, such as beef, pork, chicken, Chinese sausages, beef strips, pig blood, and duck intestine. It is characterised by its spicy and numbing flavour.

== Etymology ==
The term "mala" (麻辣) combines the words "numbing" (麻, ma) and "spicy" (辣, la), describing the sensations produced by its signature ingredients: Sichuan peppercorns and dried chilis.

== General recipes ==
As one of the most spicy types of hot pot, Chongqing hot pot uses different ingredients when making the hot pot base. The spicy Chongqing hot pot base is mainly red chili oil, which is made with beef fat and different kinds of spices, such as bay leaf, clove, cinnamon and so on. Chili, beef tallow, garlic, bean paste and other seasonings are stir-fried and boiled for a long time to form Chongqing hotpot seasoning, which is used in Chongqing hotpot soup base.

== History ==
=== In Chongqing ===
The history of Chongqing hot pot started in the 1920s in Jiangbei District in Chongqing. In the beginning, the peddlers who worked on the wharf at the time would buy beef tripe, clean and boil it, and then cut beef liver and stomach into small pieces, and place it all into a clay stove. The stove used an iron basin to divide the stove into different sections that separated ingredients with different tastes. When the spicy, salty soup had boiled, the laborers would begin to eat, each person retrieving their own food from their own part of the stove, so they would only eat and pay for what they had put there, thus avoiding overpaying for their meal. It was not until 1934 that a small restaurant in Chongqing turned the hot pot into a high-grade dish; before that, there was no restaurant that served Chongqing hot pot.

Liuyishou Hotpot has opened 1,200 restaurants worldwide.

=== In Sichuan ===
The origins of mala hotpot can be traced to riverside workers along the Yangtze River in Sichuan Province during the early 20th century. These workers, engaged in labor-intensive jobs, sought affordable, warming meals that could be customized to taste. Vendors offered a rudimentary hotpot by boiling inexpensive cuts of meat, such as beef tripe, in a pot of spiced broth. The inclusion of Sichuan peppercorns and chili oil not only masked strong meat flavors but also provided a warming sensation, which helped relieve the discomfort of cold, damp conditions. Over time, mala hotpot evolved from street food into a well-known culinary dish in restaurants, eventually attracting global interest.

== Ingredients and preparation ==
The fundamental components of mala hotpot include Sichuan peppercorn, dried chilis, and beef tallow. Sichuan peppercorns contribute the distinctive numbing sensation, while dried chilis add layers of spiciness, creating a complex, multifaceted flavor. Beef tallow, traditionally used in Sichuan-style mala hotpot, enriches the broth with a deep, savory taste, though vegetable oil is often substituted in modern variations.

Common ingredients for mala hotpot range from various cuts of meat (such as beef, lamb, and offal) to tofu, mushrooms, leafy greens, and root vegetables. To balance the bold flavors, a variety of dipping sauces are provided, allowing diners to customize their taste experience. Popular sauces include sesame oil (to temper the spiciness), soy sauce, minced garlic, and fermented bean paste. In recent years, specialized mala hotpot restaurants have added unique ingredients such as quail eggs, tripe, and seafood, catering to diverse tastes.

== Culture ==
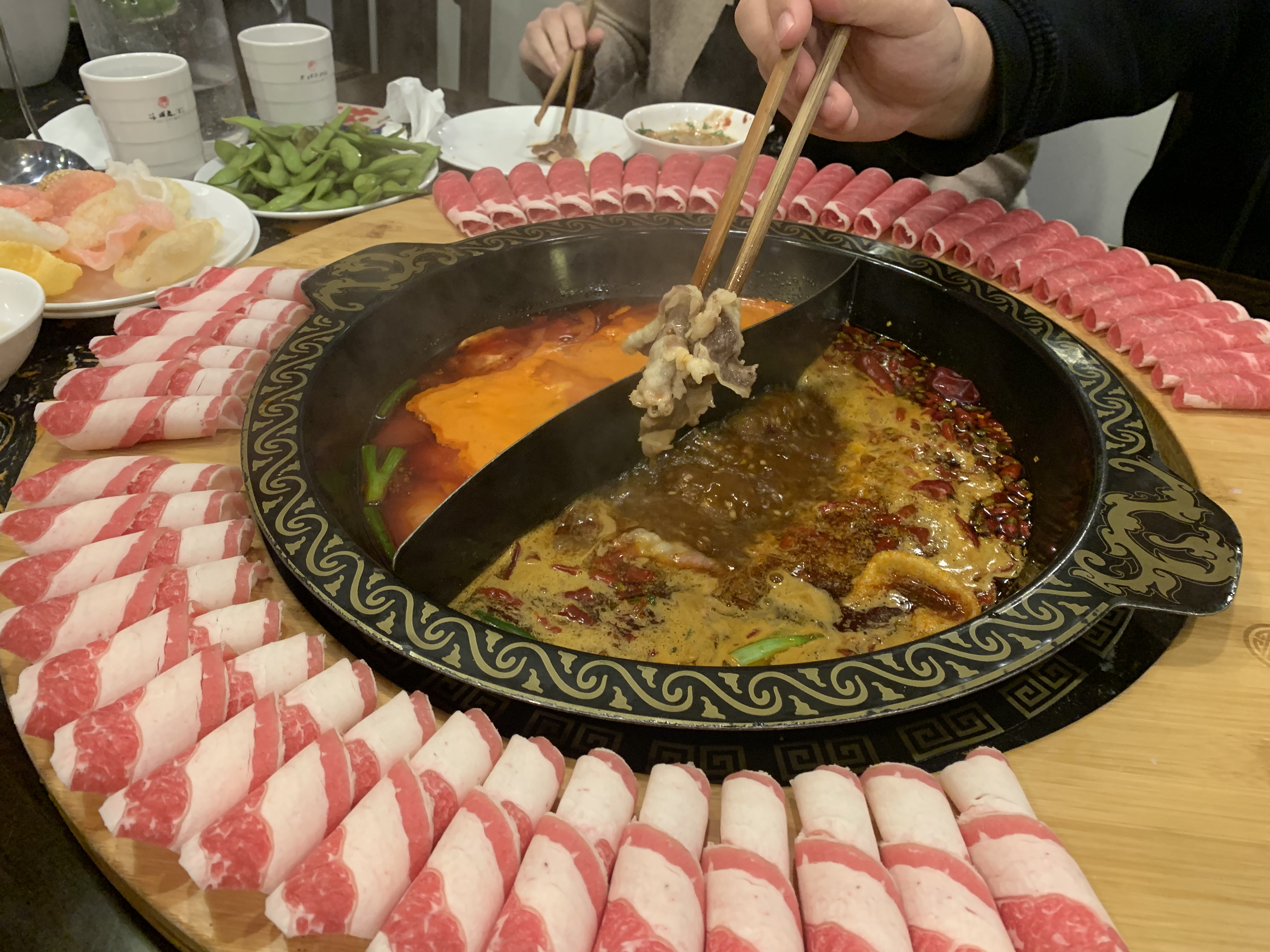
A Chongqing hot pot with slices of beef and lamb

Chongqing hot pot is not only a local delicacy, but also represents Chongqing's food culture. When eating the hot pot, families and friends gather together and surround the steaming hot pot, talking with each other. It is a suitable food choice for the traditional Chinese culture of reunion. In Chongqing, there were a total of 26,991 hot pot restaurants in 2019.

Mala hotpot offers a communal cooking experience, where a range of ingredients are prepared in a pot of spicy, numbing broth. The broth varies regionally, and ingredients such as meats, tofu and vegetables are commonly included. Dipping sauces play a significant role in balancing the intense flavors. It is typically enjoyed as a communal dining experience in which diners cook various ingredients in a simmering pot of broth.

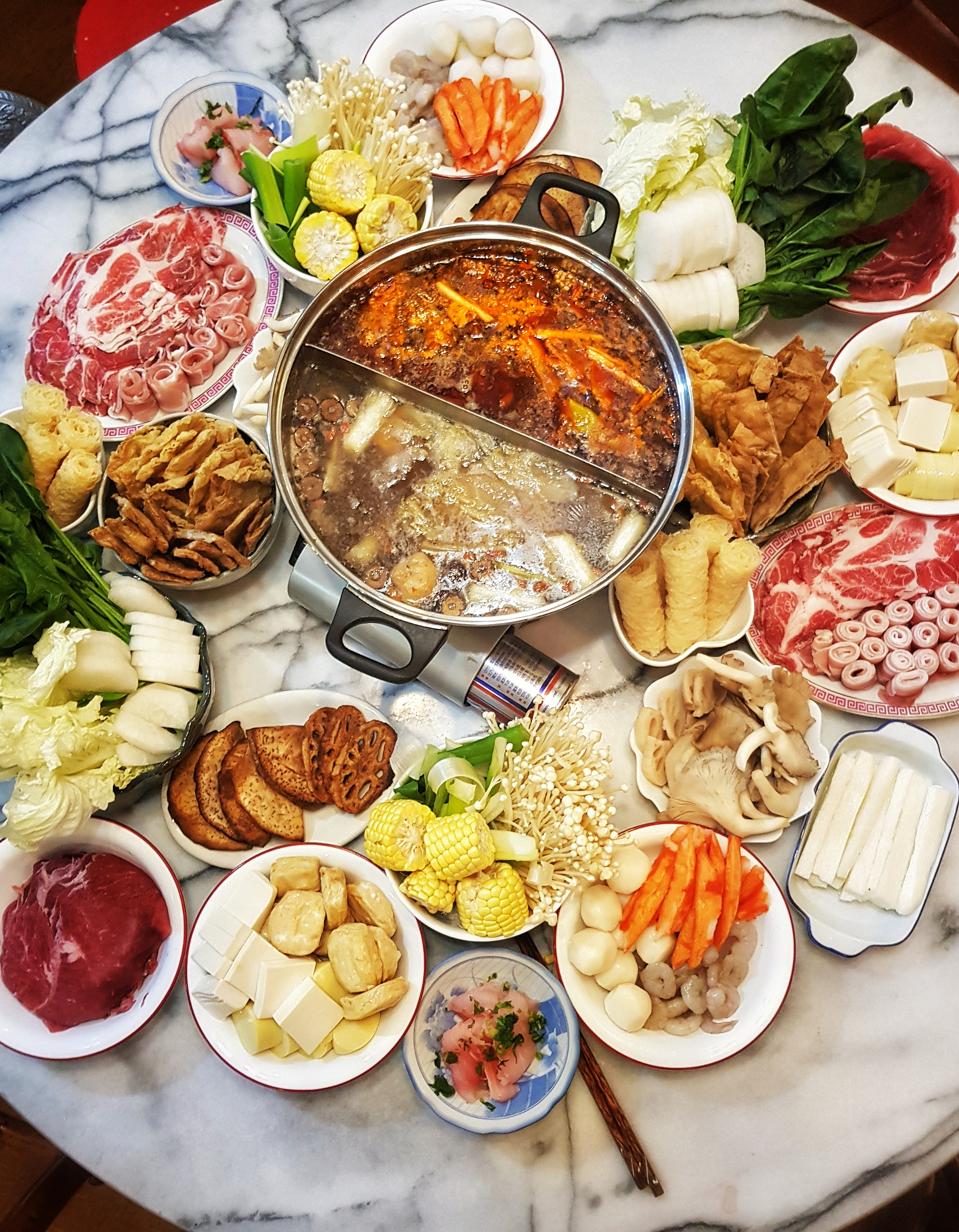
Homemade Chongqing hot pot

== Regional variations ==
As mala hotpot spread across Asia, it adapted to local palates and incorporated regional ingredients, resulting in distinct variations:

- Taiwan: Taiwanese mala hotpot is known for its slight sweetness, achieved through the addition of ingredients like rock sugar and medicinal herbs. Taiwanese versions also often feature seafood, such as shrimp, squid, and fish, as well as soft tofu and taro, creating a unique fusion of flavors.
- Japan: In Japan, mala hotpot has been influenced by local cooking techniques, especially the shabu-shabu style, where thinly sliced meats are quickly swished through the broth to cook. Japanese-style mala hotpot often includes ingredients like enoki mushrooms, daikon, and udon noodles, resulting in a lighter flavor profile compared to its Sichuan counterpart.
- Thailand: Thai adaptations of mala hotpot, influenced by the local preference for sour and herbal flavors, often include Thai herbs like lemongrass and galangal. Mala hotpot has gained popularity in Thailand as both a social and customizable dining experience, where diners can adjust spice levels to suit local taste preferences.
- South Korea: In South Korea, mala hotpot is influenced by jeongol (Korean hotpot) and frequently incorporates local ingredients like rice cakes, kimchi, and gochujang (Korean chili paste) for a richer flavor. Korean variations are typically less numbing than Sichuan-style hotpot, appealing to a wider range of spice tolerance.

== Similar dishes ==
While Mala hotpot is unique with its numbing-spicy flavors, some East Asian dishes share a similar communal cooking style:

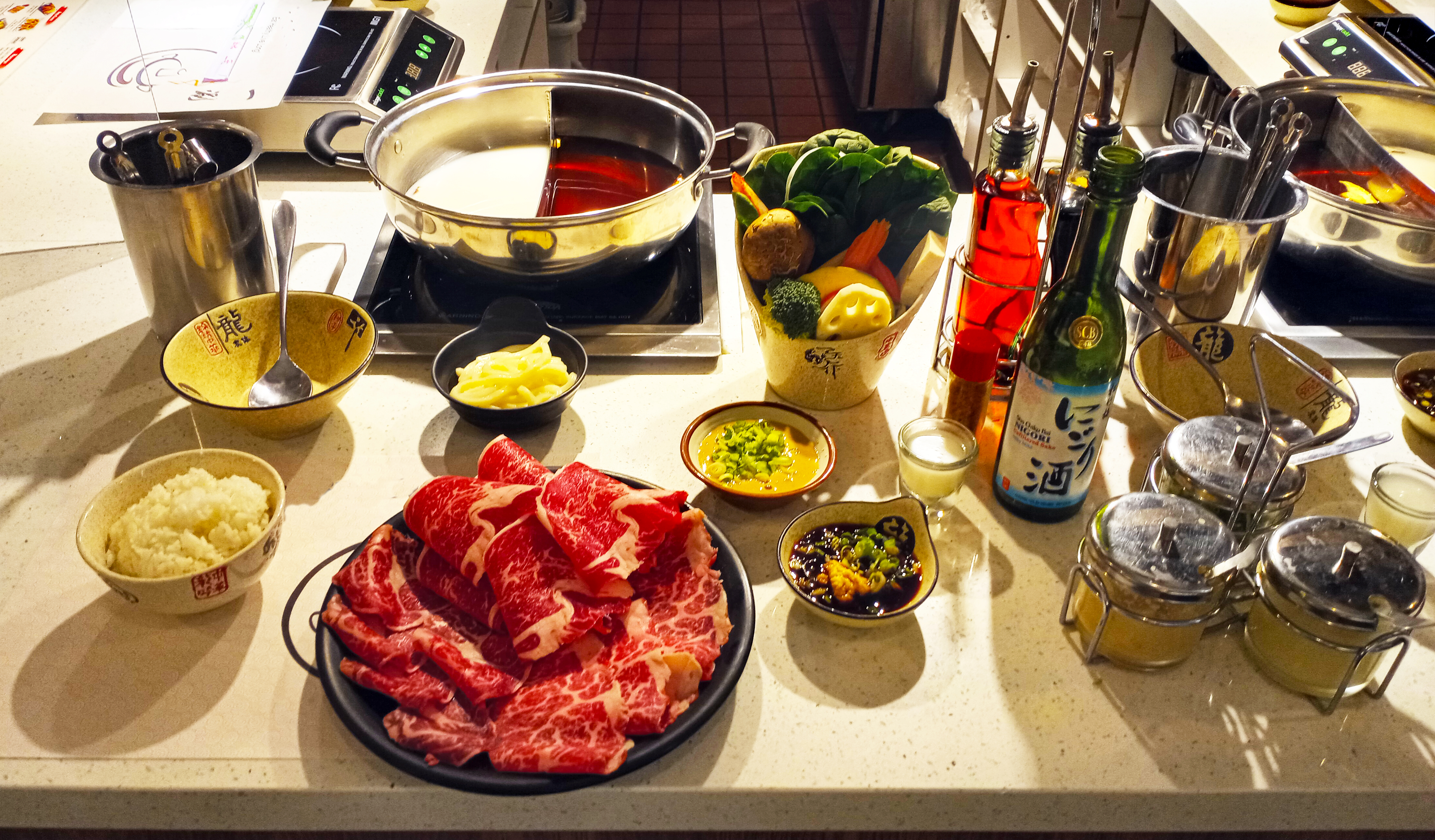
Japanese Shabu-Shabu

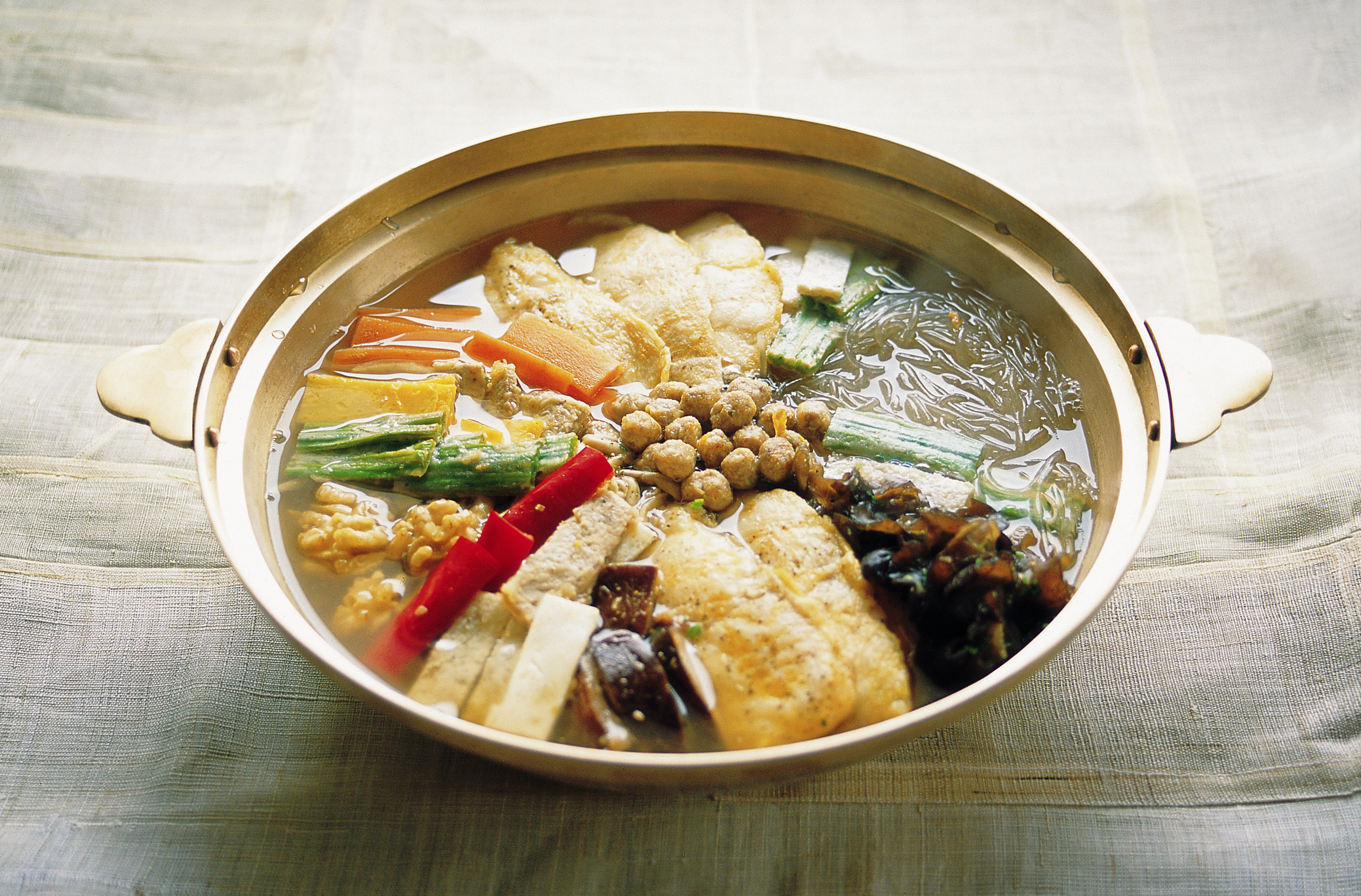
Korean Jeongol

- Japanese Shabu-shabu: This hotpot involves cooking thin slices of meat and vegetables in a clear, mild broth. Shabu-shabu is less spicy, allowing the natural flavors of the ingredients to come through.

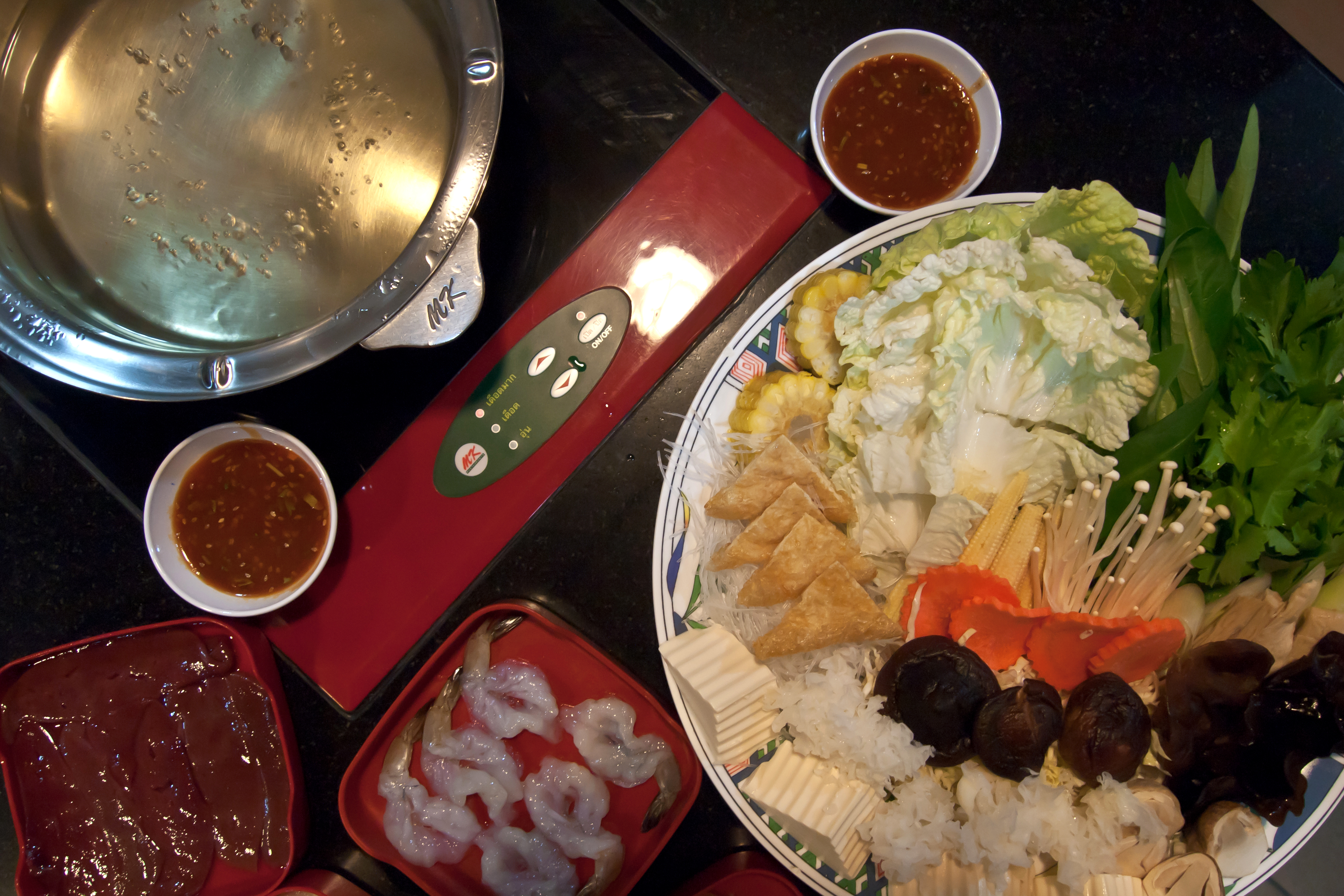
Thai Suki Yaki

- Korean Jeongol: Jeongol is a Korean hotpot with various ingredients simmered together in a large pot. It often includes spicy elements like gochujang (Korean chilli paste) but does not have the numbing effect of Sichuan peppercorn.
- Thai Suki: Thai suki is influenced by Chinese hotpot and Japanese sukiyaki. It often has a clear broth and includes Thai ingredients like celery and morning glory. A unique dipping sauce with chili, garlic, and lime adds flavor

Each of these dishes shares a communal cooking style but varies in flavor and ingredients.

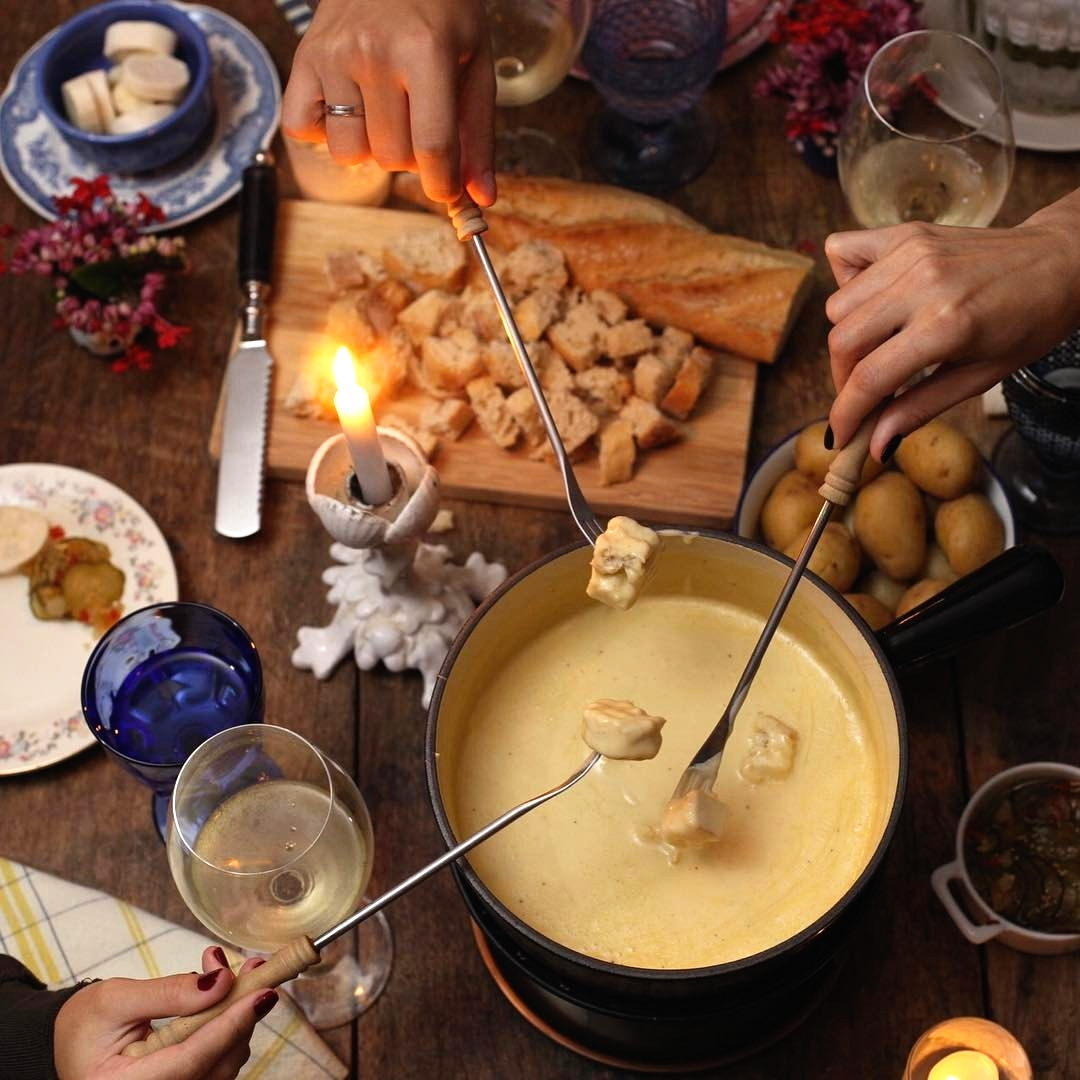
Fondue (Switzerland)

In Western cuisine, there is no direct equivalent to Mala hotpot, but some dishes have similarities in communal cooking or presentation:

- Fondue (Switzerland): Fondue, especially cheese fondue, is similar because it is an interactive meal where diners dip bread or cook meat in melted cheese or hot oil.
- Bouillabaisse (France): Bouillabaisse is a French seafood stew with various fish, shellfish, and herbs in a rich broth. It is similar in its variety of ingredients and broth base but is not cooked at the table.

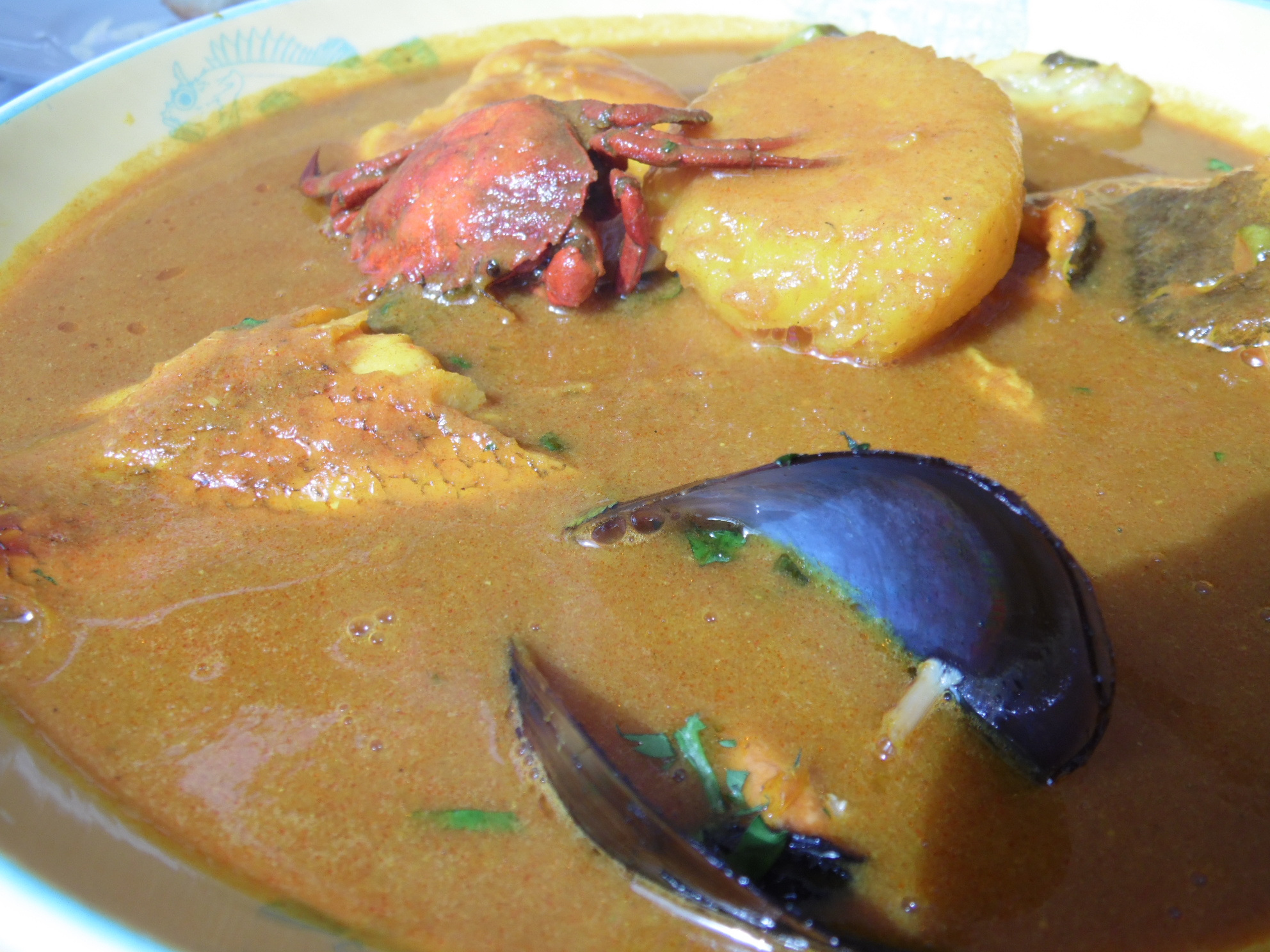
Bouillabaisse

- Clam bake (United States): A New England clam bake involves cooking seafood, corn, and potatoes together over hot stones or in a pit. Though not cooked at the table, it is a social, shared meal

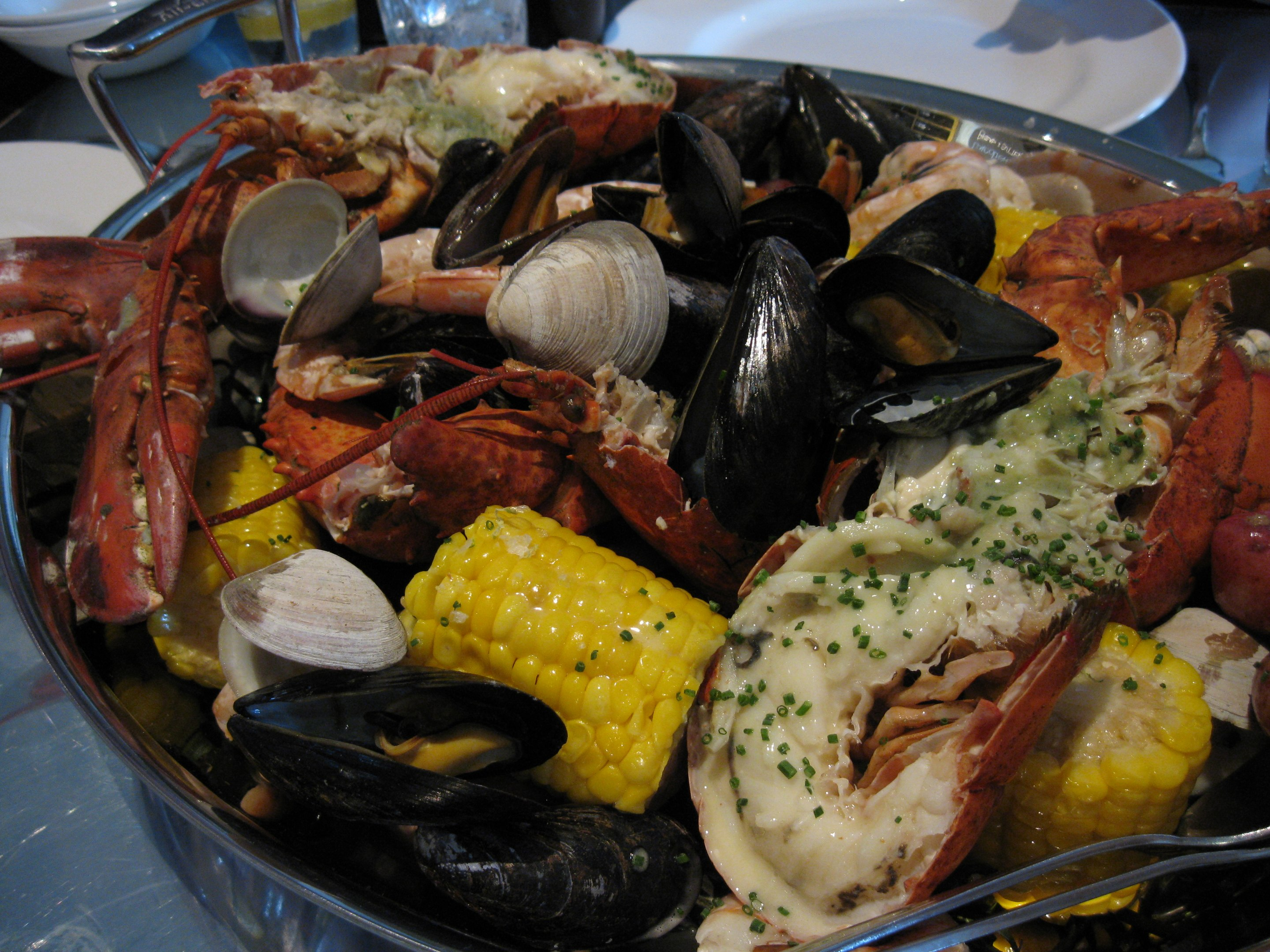
Clam Bake

- Cioppino (Italy/United States): Cioppino is an Italian-American seafood stew with seafood in a tomato-based broth. Ingredients are simmered together in the kitchen, making it similar in its broth-based style.

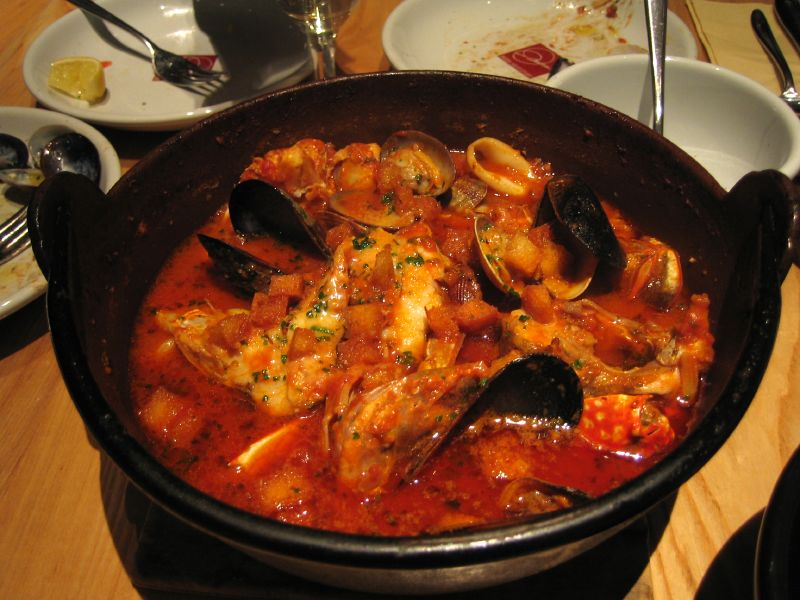
Cioppino

These Western dishes share elements of communal dining and flavorful broths but lack the numbing-spicy flavor of mala hotpot. However, as Asian hotpot becomes popular in the West, many diners are embracing this unique cooking style.

== See also ==
- Chongqing noodles
