= Malatang =

Chinese street food

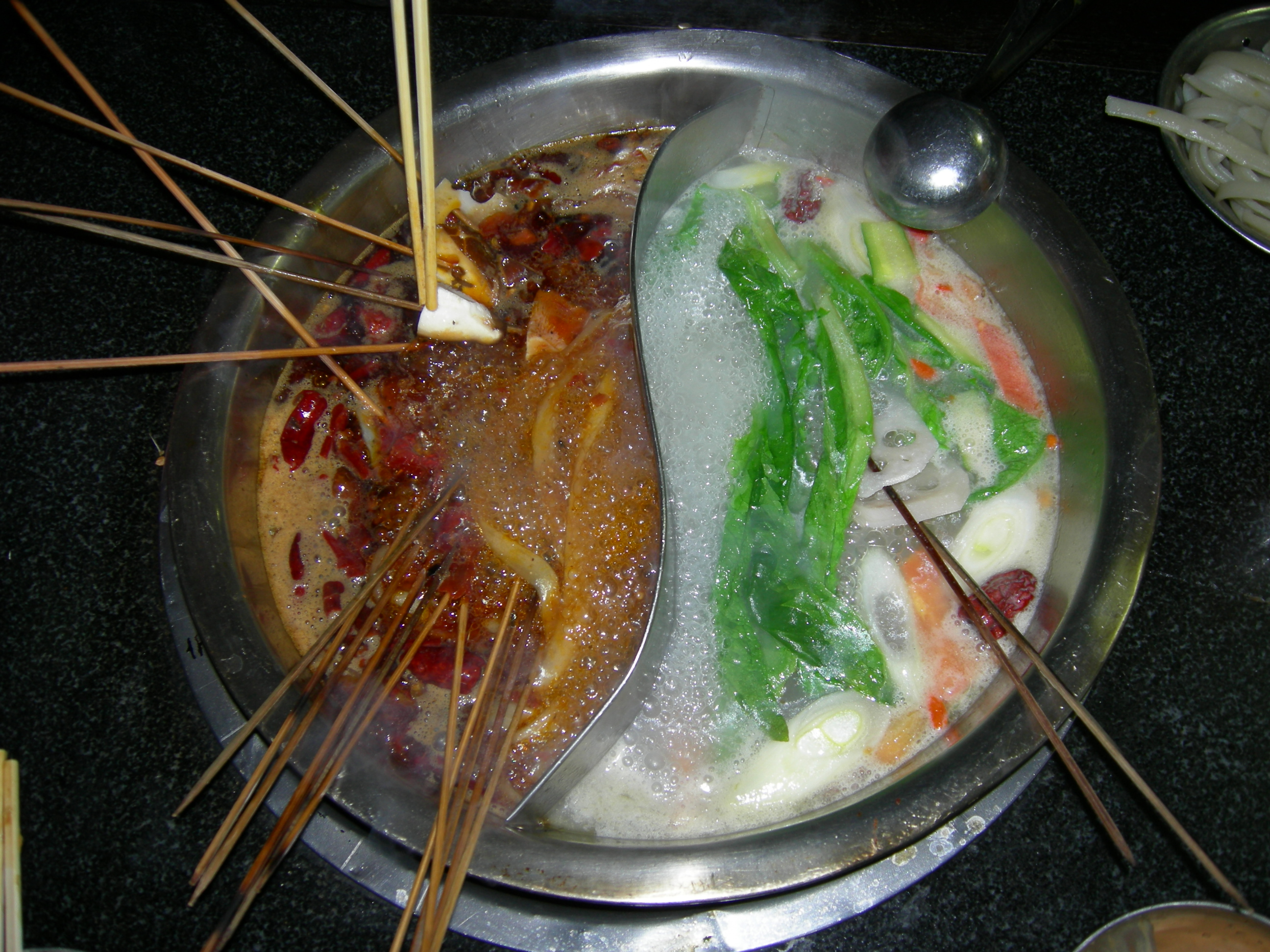
- Traditional Chinese: 麻辣燙
- Simplified Chinese: 麻辣烫
- Literal meaning: numb spicy hot
Transcriptions
Standard Mandarin
- Hanyu Pinyin: málàtàng
- Gwoyeu Romatzyh: malahtanq
Yue: Cantonese
- Yale Romanization: màah laaht tong
- Jyutping: maa4 laat6 tong3

Malatang (traditional Chinese: 麻辣燙; simplified Chinese: 麻辣烫; pinyin: málàtàng; lit. 'numb spicy hot') is a Sichuan street food in which skewered or self-selected meats, vegetables, and noodles simmer briefly in a numbing broth seasoned with Sichuan pepper and dried chili. The dish developed among boat trackers along the Yangtze River near Sichuan, where workers cooked herbs with peppercorns and ginger to counter the damp and sultry climate.

Street vendors adapted the communal pot for urban stalls, and by the mid-2010s malatang shops across northern China invited customers to assemble bowls that are priced by weight after a quick boil. International chains later introduced the format to markets such as Australia, while public health discussions in China highlight both the variety of nutrients diners can combine and regulatory crackdowns on illicit additives.

== Etymology ==
Malatang is named after its key ingredient, mala sauce, which is flavored with a blend of Sichuan pepper and dried chili. The word málà is composed of the Chinese characters for "numbing" (麻) and "spicy (hot)" (辣), referring to the feeling in the mouth after eating the sauce.

== History ==
=== Early origin ===
Malatang is said to have originated in the inland port city of Leshan (乐山), Sichuan in the Qing era. The local boatmen, trackers, dockworkers, and salt workers hauled goods such as salt and coal along the Yangtze River. According to this account, these workers created a quick and convenient meal by cooking pre-cut ingredients in communal broth seasoned with Sichuan pepper, ginger as well as other spices and herbs. The hot, numbing broth was particularly suited to workers seeking a swift meal in the fast-paced and damp labor conditions along the waterway. Street vendors recognized the appeal of the pungent broth and began selling skewered ingredients cooked to order in shared vats, which distinguished the dish from restaurant hotpot meals that are prepared for a single table.

=== Modern popularization ===
A bowl of malatang prepared with local ingredients of Lanzhou, Gansu

China News Service reports on local Malatang in Tianshui, Gansu

By the late 1990s, the dish had spread beyond Sichuan, and its proliferation has been widely attributed to the wave of mass layoffs (Xiagang: 下岗) affecting state-owned enterprises in northeast China. In search of livelihood, many displaced industrial workers turned to small-scale food businesses, including malatang stalls, which required relatively little professional training. As the dish was adapted to tastes of northeastern Chinese cuisine, variations emerged featuring milder, often bone-based broths and the use of seasame sauce alongside other seasonings, contrasting with the more intensly numbing and spicy flavors associated with traditional Sichuan-style malatang. The adaption of malatang by vendors in the northeast had thus helped to promote the dish for wider markets across China. During the 2010s, proprietors across north China popularized self-service shops where customers select ingredients that are cooked together and charged by weight. Chains based in China and abroad later brought malatang to international cities. It became especially popular in Australia, where many restaurants now offer additional broth styles such as laksa, tom yum, and pho in line with local tastes.

== Preparation and service ==
=== Skewer stalls ===
Vendors typically set a wide pot or griddle at street level and keep skewers of tofu, vegetables, meat, and offal simmering in a mildly spicy broth. Customers sit or stand around the pot, select the skewers they want, and ask the vendor to replenish missing items as ingredients run low.

Customers keep the used wooden sticks by their plates, and when a customer finishes eating, the price to pay is determined by counting the number of empty sticks.

=== Self-service shops ===
In the mid-2010s malatang shops spread through North China, offering refrigerated shelves or displays where diners choose ingredients and carry them to the counter. Staff boil the selections for several minutes in a high-temperature broth before dressing each bowl with condiments such as garlic, black pepper, Sichuan pepper, chili pepper, sesame paste, and crushed peanuts. Cashiers weigh the finished bowl to determine the price.

== Ingredients ==
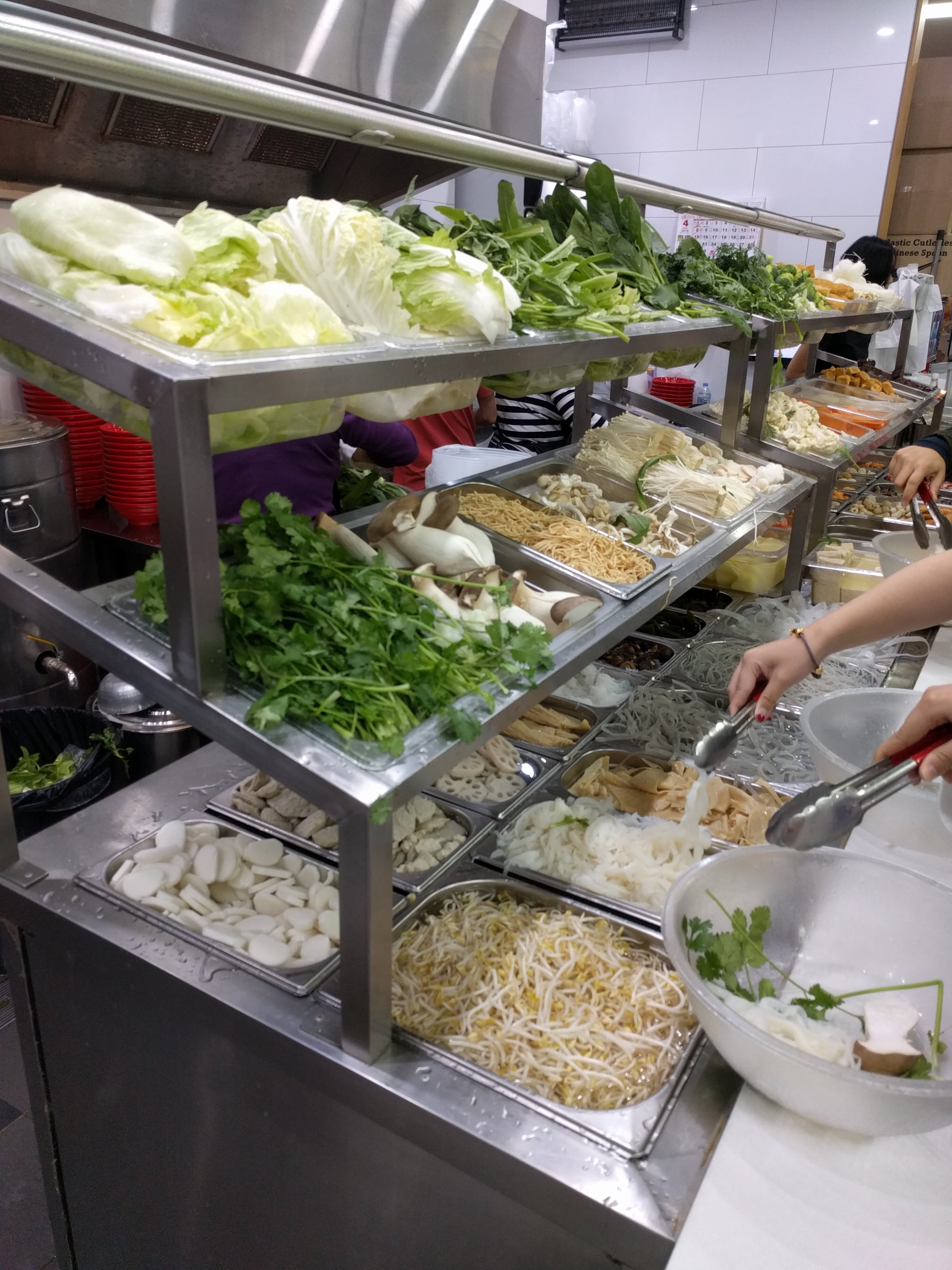
Self-service selection of ingredients at a malatang shop, with vegetables and noodles in the foreground and fish and meat in the back

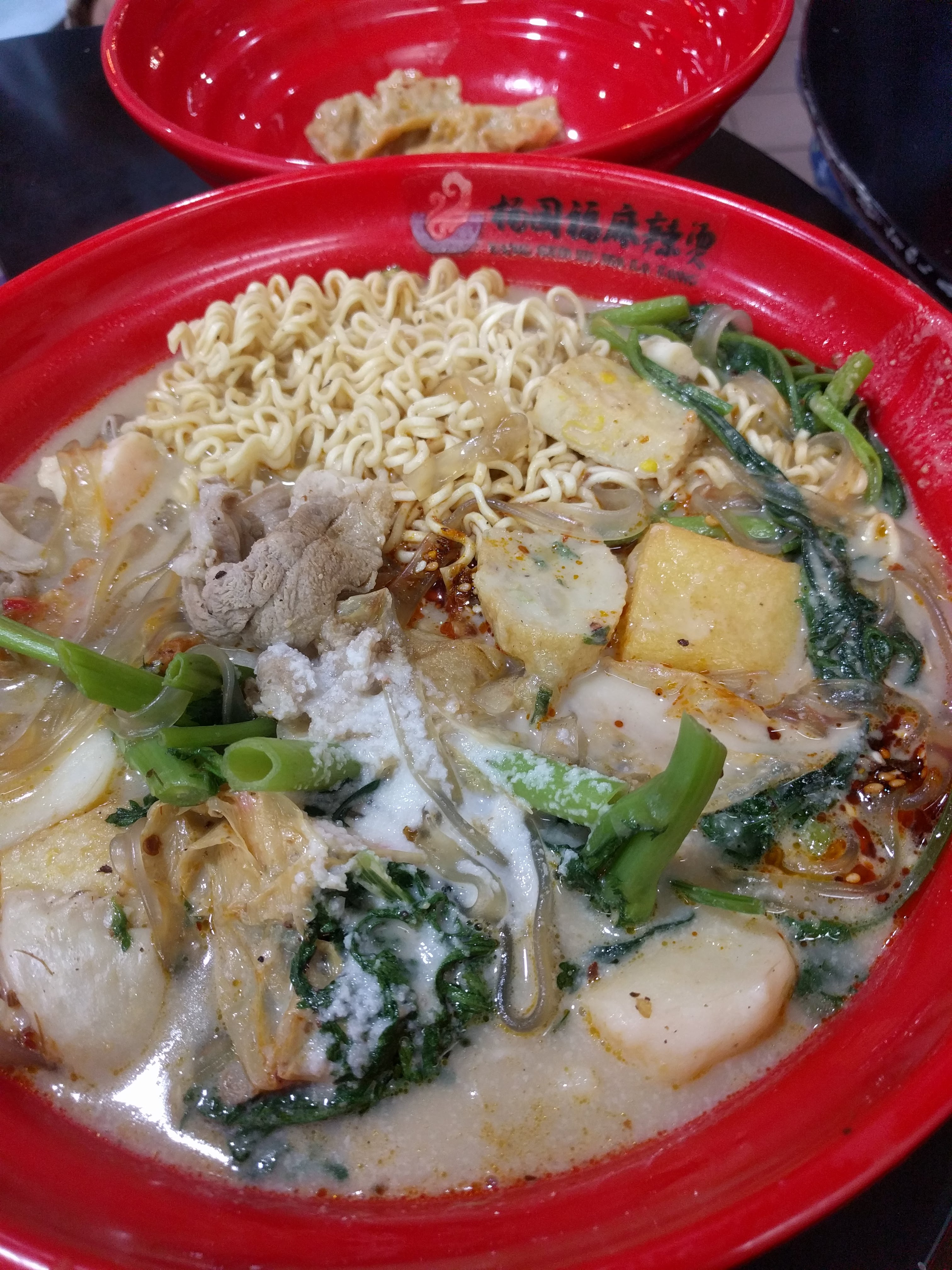
A ready bowl of malatang soup

Some of the common ingredients include:

- wosun (celtuce)
- beef (chunks)
- dumplings
- lettuce
- spinach
- other mixed greens
- lotus root
- mushrooms
- fresh and instant noodles
- pork liver
- pork lung
- potato
- quail eggs
- Spam
- Chinese yam
- sheep intestines
- numerous types of dried and frozen tofu
- nian gao rice cakes
- beef balls
- fish balls
- chicken balls
- sweet potato
- tripe
- fish roe lucky bag

== Nutrition and regulation ==
Chinese health writers note that patrons often include a broad mix of vegetables and meats in malatang, which allows diners to combine varied nutrients during a single meal.

Food safety authorities have also prosecuted vendors for adding poppy seed pods and other illicit ingredients to malatang broth, citing the additive's numbing properties and potential to cause dependence.
