= Zajiangmian =

Sichuanese noodle dish

Zajiang mian
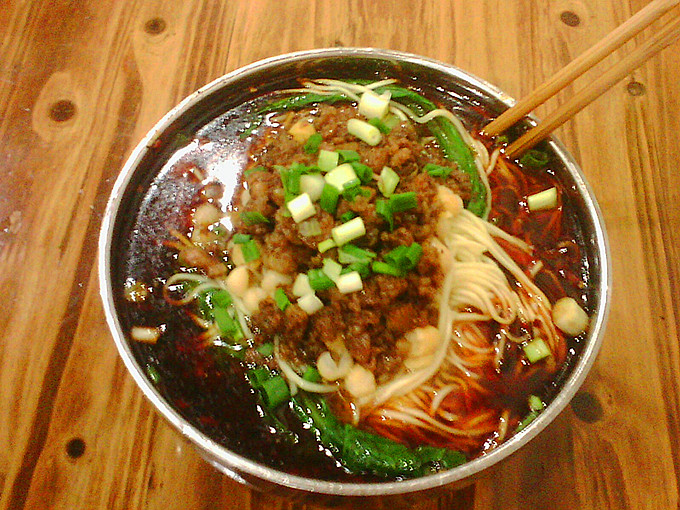
- Wanza mian (Chinese: 豌杂面), a form of zajiang mian with peas
- Alternative names: Zajiangmian, mixed sauce noodles
- Place of origin: China
- Region or state: Sichuan
- Main ingredients: Ground meat (pork, sometimes beef), lard

Zajiang mian (simplified Chinese: 杂酱面; traditional Chinese: 雜酱麵, 'noodles with zajiang') is a noodle dish from the Sichuan region of China. The zajiang (Chinese: 杂酱, 'mixed sauce'), also known as shaozi (Chinese: 䬰子), is a meat sauce mostly made from lean ground meat (often pork, sometimes beef) and lard. Tallow may also be used as an alternative to lard, albeit less commonly. The ingredients used for making zajiang could differ, but usually include chili oil, and occasionally, doubanjiang.

== Variations ==
=== Wanza mian ===
Wanza mian (Chinese: 豌杂面) is a variety of zajiang mian served with peas. It is especially popular in some areas of Sichuan region, including Chongqing. It features the creamy, smooth, slurry-like texture and yellowish colour from boiled peas. The name wanza mian is an abbreviation of zajiang with peas noodles (Chinese: 豌豆雜酱麵) in local language.

=== Sujiao zajiang mian ===
Sujiao zajiang mian (Chinese: 素椒杂酱面), or gan zajiang mian (Chinese: 干杂酱面, dry zajiang noodles), is a dry variation of zajiang mian without soup. In this style, the noodles may be flavoured with seasonings such as chili oil, sesame oil and soy sauce before the zajiang being added. It is one of the most common forms of zajiang mian in Sichuan, particularly in area around Chengdu.

=== Soup zajiang mian ===
==== Red soup zajiang mian ====
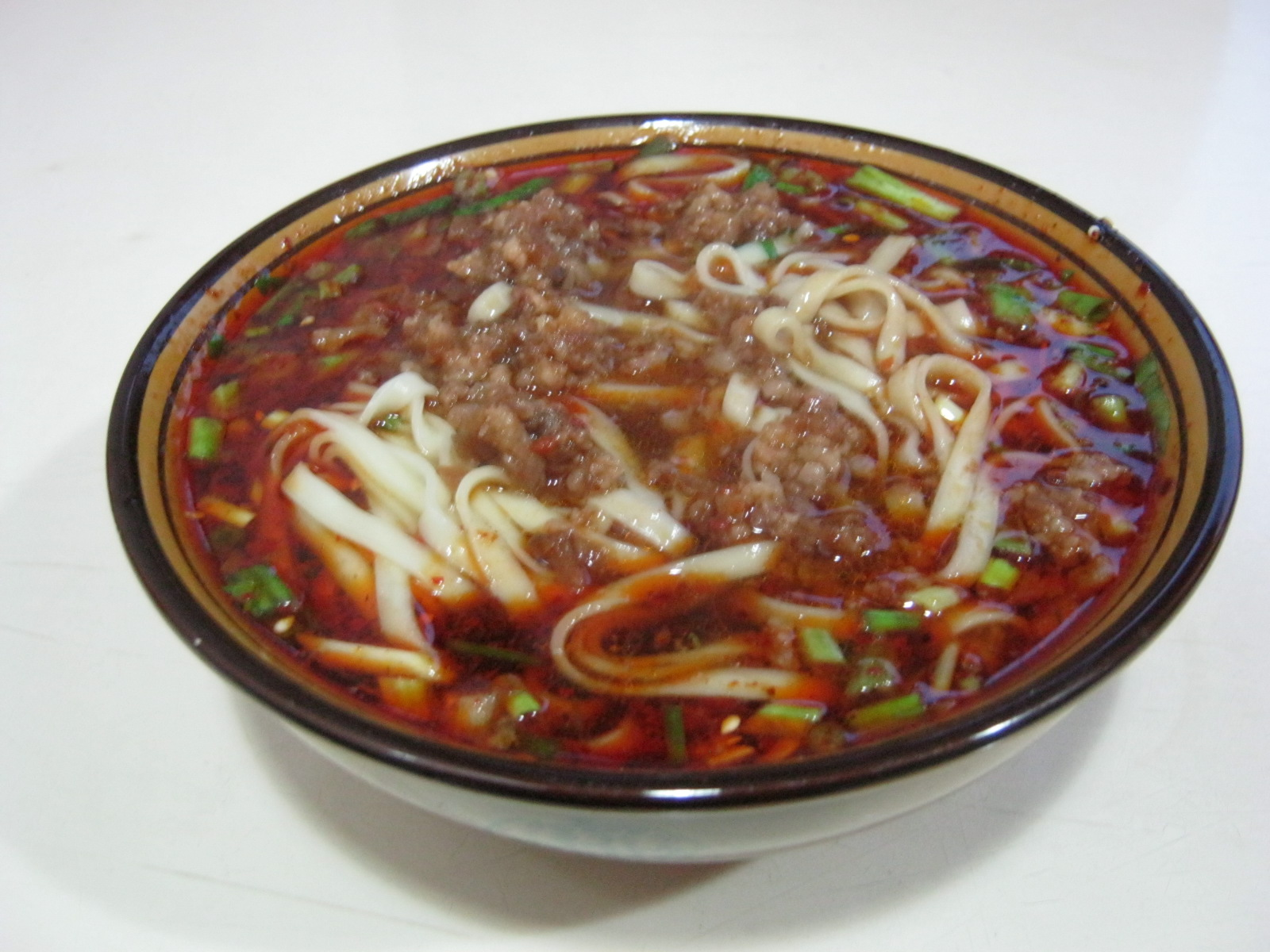
A bowl of red soup zajiang mian

Red soup zajiang mian is a form of zajiang mian where the zajiang serves as a topping on noodle soups. The soup base of red soup zajiang mian mostly features a spicy heavy flavour.

==== Clear soup zajiang mian ====
Similar to red soup zajiang mian, clear soup zajiang mian is a soup-based adaption of zajiang mian but with a non-spicy soup base. It is often served in Sichuanese school and workplace canteen due to its simplicity and lighter taste.
