= Guaiwei =

Chinese seasoning

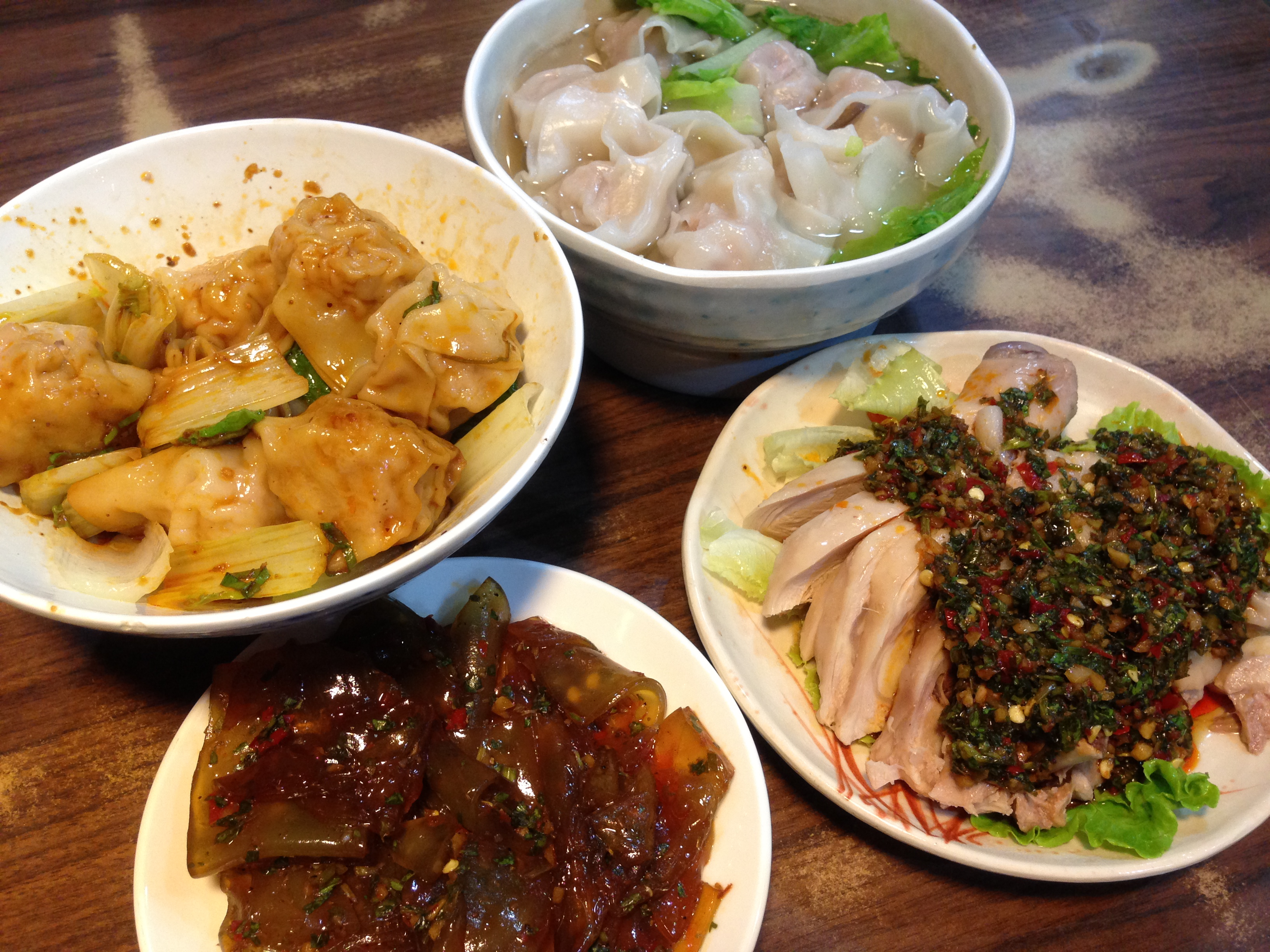
- Guaiwei chicken, alongside other dishes
- Alternative names: 怪味
- Type: seasoning mixture

Guaiwei (Chinese: 怪味; pinyin: guàiwèi), literally "exotic taste" or "strange taste", is a seasoning mixture in Sichuan cuisine of China. Although it is popular in the Sichuan province, it is rarely used outside the region's cuisine, unlike yuxiang, another seasoning mixture of the region. The guaiwei seasoning exists in several forms, but can be viewed as the combination of yuxiang and mala seasoning with a high proportion of sesame and sour ingredients.

== Preparation ==
The ingredients of guaiwei always consists of either some or all of each group of:

- Sesame: Using either ground sesame, sesame oil, or sesame paste;
- Sour: Using either lemon juice or more traditionally, dark rice vinegar (香醋);
- Yuxiang;
- Piquant: Using Sichuan peppercorns, occasionally without chili;
- Savory: Using soy sauce or salt and less commonly, doubanjiang;
- Sugar;
- Huangjiu (Chinese rice wine) may be used occasionally.

Preparation of the seasoning mixture can be done cold or hot, with cold mixtures being richer and heavier and hot mixtures lighter in taste.

== Dishes ==
Dishes that strongly use guaiwei are named as such. For instance:

- Guàiwèijī (怪味雞): Chicken braised in guaiwei
- Guàiwèidǔsī (怪味肚絲): Pork tripe braised in guaiwei
- Guàiwèiniújiàn (怪味牛腱): Guaiwei beef shank
- Guàiwèidòu (怪味豆): Guaiwei fava beans, eaten as a snack
