= Bang bang chicken =

Chinese chicken dish

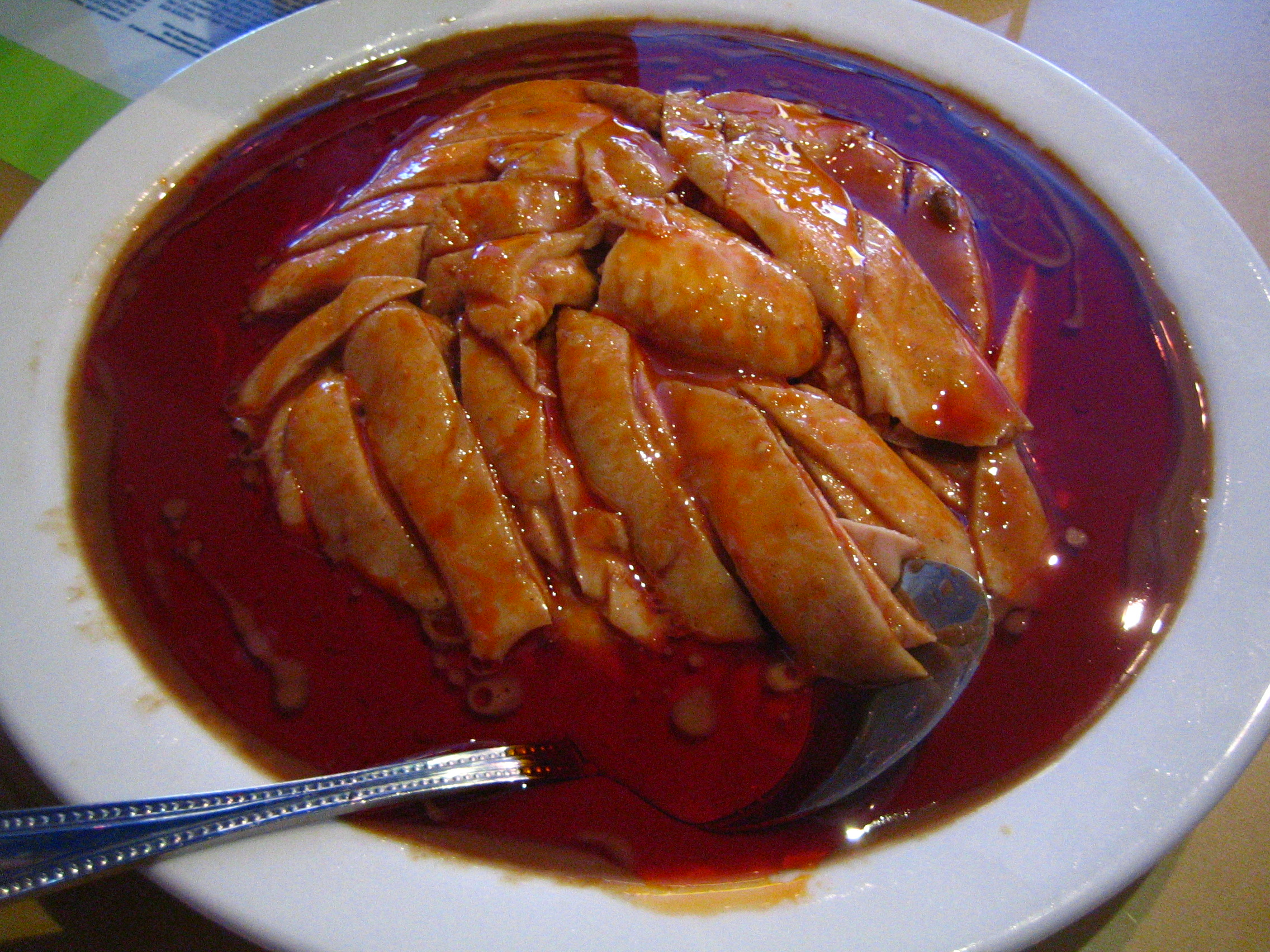
Bon bon chicken with sauce

Bang bang chicken (Chinese: 棒棒雞; pinyin: bàng bàng jī; lit. 'baton-baton chicken'), also known by variant names such as bam bam chicken or bon bon chicken, is a popular chicken dish in Chinese cuisine. The name 'bang bang chicken' is derived from the Chinese word for stick, 'bàng'(棒), referring to the baton or cudgel traditionally used to tenderize the meat.

== Origins ==
Bang bang chicken originates in the street food of Sichuan. Some food historians believe it to have originated in the town of Hang Yang Ba during the early 20th century. The name of the dish comes from bàng (棒), the Chinese word for stick. This is a reference to the wooden stick or cudgel used to tenderize the meat. A popular myth claims that the name comes from the sound of tenderizing the meat by pounding it, but this is unlikely.

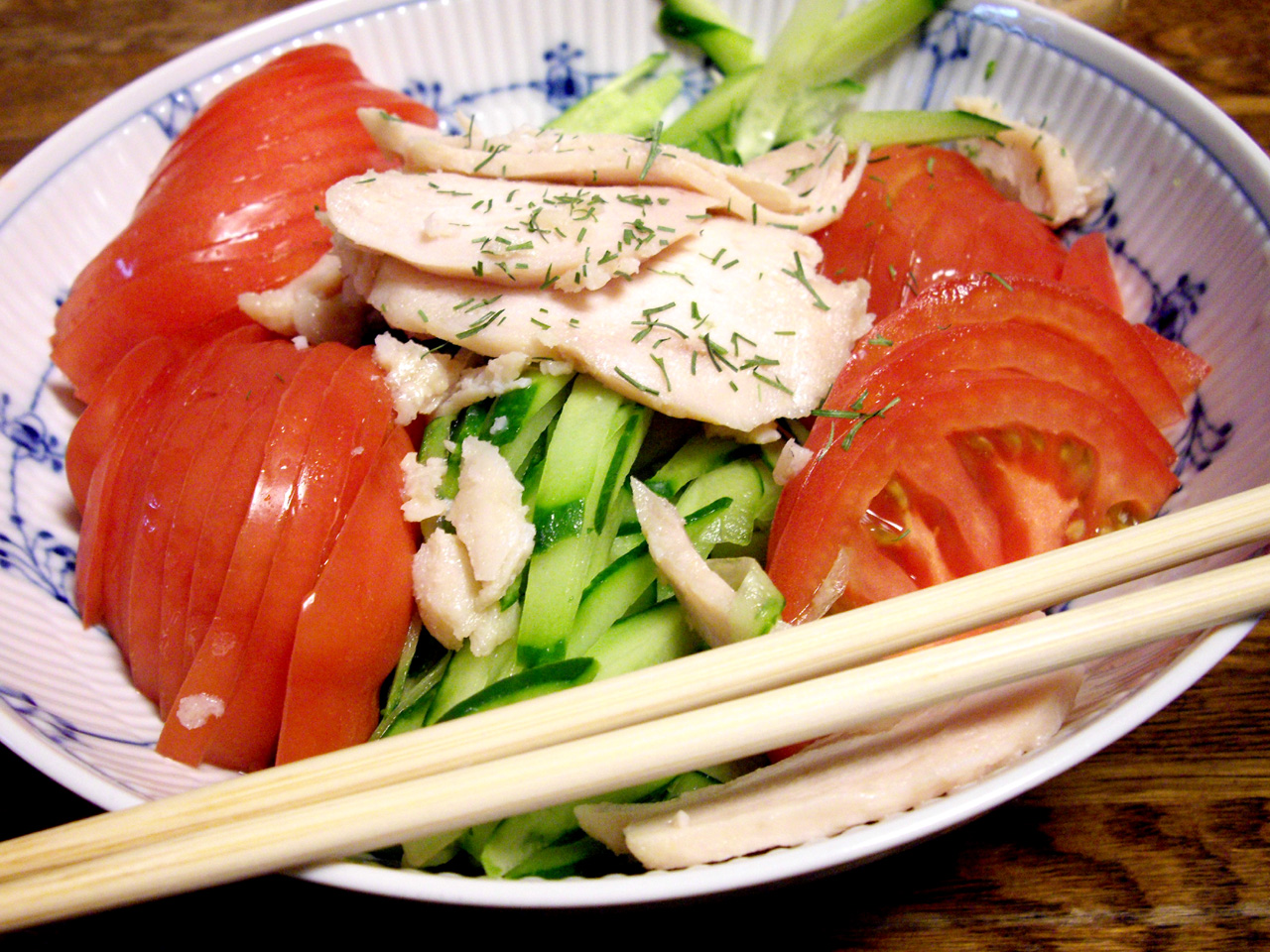
Bon bon chicken without sauce served with a salad

== Preparation ==
Bang bang chicken is prepared by poaching or steaming chicken. The cooked chicken is banged with sticks to tenderize it and pound it into shreds. In traditional recipes, the shredded meat is tossed in a sauce made with sesame paste, chili oil, Sichuan pepper and black vinegar. Fresh herbs are also tossed with it. Variations of the sauce may include chili peppers, peanuts, garlic, ginger and soy sauce. It is traditionally served with julienned cucumbers.

== Variations ==
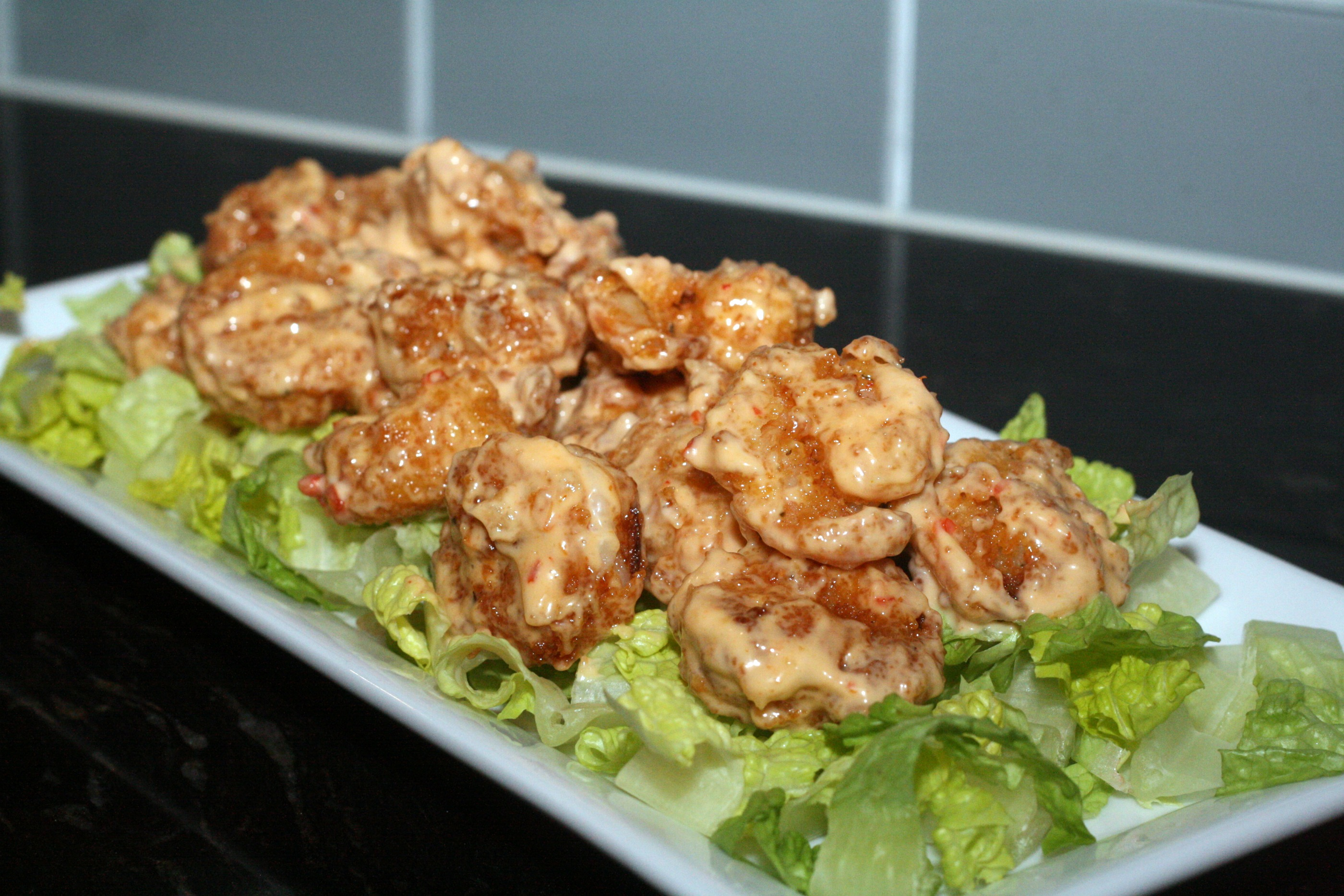
Bang bang shrimp

Westernized variations of "bang bang chicken" are served in American Chinese cuisine. Many of these recipes are based on breaded and fried chicken or shrimp in a mayonnaise sauce. These recipes may have been popularized by "bang bang shrimp" dishes on the menus of American restaurant chains like Bonefish Grill and have little in common with the authentic Chinese dish. This variation is prepared by breading pieces of boneless chicken and deep-frying them. The fried meat is then coated in a sauce based on mayonnaise and sweet chili sauce.

=== Bang bang shrimp ===
Bang bang shrimp is considered to be the progenitor of mayonnaise-based "bang bang" dishes in the United States. It is prepared in a similar manner to American-style bang bang chicken, using whole shrimp instead of chicken pieces.

== See also ==
- Guaiwei ("uncanny" or "strange flavour"), one of the two dozen flavour profiles of Sichuan cuisine
- List of Chinese dishes
