= Tiger-skin peppers =

- Chinese: 虎皮青椒
- Cuisine: Sichuan cuisine

The tiger-skin peppers (Chinese: 虎皮青椒), also spelled as tiger skin peppers, known as hupi qingjiao in Chinese, blistered and papery, dressed in oil and salt, is a hot dish made with green peppers as the main ingredient.

Tiger-skin peppers got its name because the peppers are fried and slightly charred, and those mottled charred spots are like the patterns of a tiger. Tiger-skin peppers is an ordinary homemade dish, crispy on the outside and soft on the inside, slightly spicy.
