= Leng chi tu =

Traditional Chinese dish

Leng chi tu (Chinese: 冷吃兔; pinyin: lěng chī tù; lit. 'cold eaten rabbit') is a traditional Chinese dish made of spicy (mala) marinated rabbit meat that is consumed chilled. Its name means "rabbit eaten cold". Leng chi tu is enjoyed in various regions of China, particularly in Sichuan and Guizhou provinces.

It is particularly notable in Zigong.

== Preparation ==
The preparation of this dish involves soaking the rabbit meat in a marinade of ginger, garlic, Sichuan peppercorn, and chili oil for several hours. The marinated meat is then boiled and chilled, and served with a variety of dipping sauces.
