= Yanbangcai =

Chinese dish

Yanbangcai (Chinese: 鹽幫菜; pinyin: yánbāngcài; lit. 'salt clique dish') is a genre of traditional Sichuan dishes that originated in the city of Zigong in southwest China, which is famous for its salt industry.

Zigong yanbangcai originated in the Eastern Han dynasty in the south of Gu Lushui (古泸水) watershed. Yanbangcai is divided into salt business dishes (盐商菜), salt workers dishes (盐工菜), and hall dishes (会馆菜). Yibin Sanjiang (宜宾三江) cuisine collectively referred to as Lu dishes (泸菜), because all belong to the ancient Lushui watershed, yanbangcai is an integral part of Lu dishes, is the features dishes of the Sichuan cuisine. It not only follows the tradition that "Different dishes have different flavors, and cooking techniques diverse" of Sichuan cuisine, but also features the "thick fragrant, spicy fresh stimulation".

Yanbangcai is good at applying ginger and salt. Cooking, stewing, deep-fried, quick-fry, each with a tricks. Forming a distinctive flavor and taste different from other cuisines.

== Development history ==
Zigong area of salt industry began in the Eastern Han dynasty, Tang and Song dynasties have been known for all of the Sichuan province.

Since the Ming and Qing dynasties, with the rise of artesian wells, Zigong salt industry gradually heyday. When the Qianlong, become one of the five centers of production in Sichuan. Jiadao period, center of become one of the three centers. Xianfeng Tongzhi years, become the center of Sichuan salt production center, the only executive of the salt industry in Sichuan ears. With an annual output of more than three million tons of salt, sales to Sichuan, Yunnan, Guizhou, Hunan, Hubei more than two hundred counties .About one-tenth of the population edible for all of country. The frame of "Yandu" famous for home and abroad .Economic prosperity, the gathering of the population, the prosperity of culture, make here's Sichuan Opera, lanterns, restaurants, gradually become the first good area of Sichuan.

During the middle period of the Qing dynasty, Zigong salt industry attracted not only investors come here opened banks from Shanxi, Shaanxi, Guangdong, Jiangxi, Guizhou, Hubei and Hunan provinces, but also laborers come here work directly and indirectly from surrounding Guizhou, Yunnan . At that time, the salt merchants and salt workers gathered in Yandu were around 200,000 people. Different levels of food consumption and hobbies, different regional food culture blend, so that Zigong gradually formed a unique flavor of yanbangcai. For yanbangcai's heritage and development make important contributions. Timeless, many people come here especially.

== The culture of Yanbang ==
Yanbangcai and Yanbang culture is a bright star in the Chinese civilization. Sichuan Zigong has two thousand years of salt industry history, known as "Millennium Salt (千年盐)" and famous. Zigong is the birthplace of yanbangcai and Yanbang culture. Yanbangcai for its special taste won the reputation of Sichuan.

There is a legend about the yanbangcai – Sima Xiangru (司马相如) and Zhuo Wenjun (卓文君) beautiful story,. It tells the Millennium yanbangcai's life and changes in food, and reflects the deep cultural heritage. The voice expressed the Sima Xiangru's love. Then two Individuals love each other, but was strongly obstructed by Zhuo Wangsun (卓王孫), had to elope. After returning to Chengdu, the daughter of Shujun Yanbang all the kitchen master, Zhuo Wenjun's mother will burn her first-hand skills to Zhuo Wenjun. In the case of life distress, Wenjun put their own headdress and opened a wine shop and restaurants, Wenjun when the clay sell wine, they have a happy life. Their stories spread widely. After two thousand years of deduction and heritage, yanbangcai really become the endorsement of quality Sichuan.

The reputation yanbangcai, just as this beautiful and lingering love story, makes people thoughtful.
