= Twice-cooked pork =

Chinese pork dish

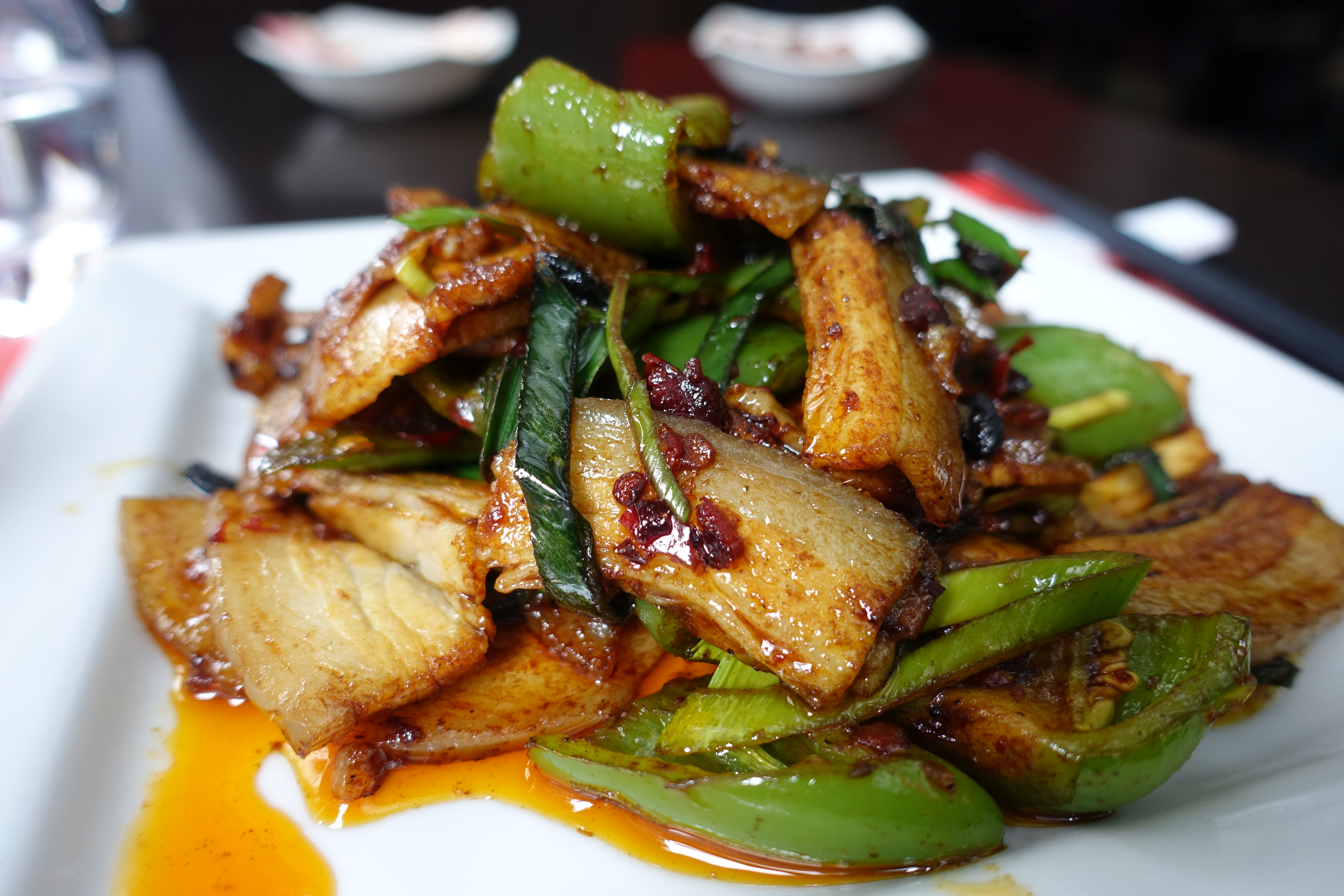
- Twice-cooked pork with vegetables
- Alternative names: Hui guo rou
- Place of origin: China
- Region or state: Sichuan
- Associated cuisine: Sichuan cuisine
- Serving temperature: Hot
- Main ingredients: Pork, vegetables, Shaoxing wine, hoisin sauce

Twice-cooked pork
- Traditional Chinese: 回鍋肉
- Simplified Chinese: 回锅肉
- Literal meaning: meat returned to the wok
Transcriptions
Standard Mandarin
- Hanyu Pinyin: huíguōròu
Yue: Cantonese
- Jyutping: wui^{4} wo^{1}yuk^{6}

Twice-cooked pork or double-cooked pork (Chinese: 回鍋肉; pinyin: huíguōròu; lit. 'meat returned to the wok') is a Chinese dish in Sichuan cuisine. The pork belly is simmered, sliced, and then stir-fried—"returned to the wok." The pork is accompanied with stir-fried vegetables, most commonly garlic sprouts, but often baby leeks, cabbage, bell peppers, onions, or scallions. The sauce may include Shaoxing rice wine, hoisin sauce, soy sauce, sugar, ginger, chili bean paste, and sweet wheat paste.

This dish is commonly associated with yan jian rou (Chinese: 鹽煎肉; lit. 'salted fried pork'), which tastes quite similar, but cooked in a different process.

== Preparation ==
The process of cooking twice-cooked pork involves first simmering pork belly steaks in water with spices, such as ginger, cloves, star anise, jujubes, or salt. After refrigeration to firm the meat, it is cut into thin slices. The pork belly is then returned to a wok and shallow fried in oil, usually along with some vegetables, onions, herbs. It can be served with rice.

== Gallery ==
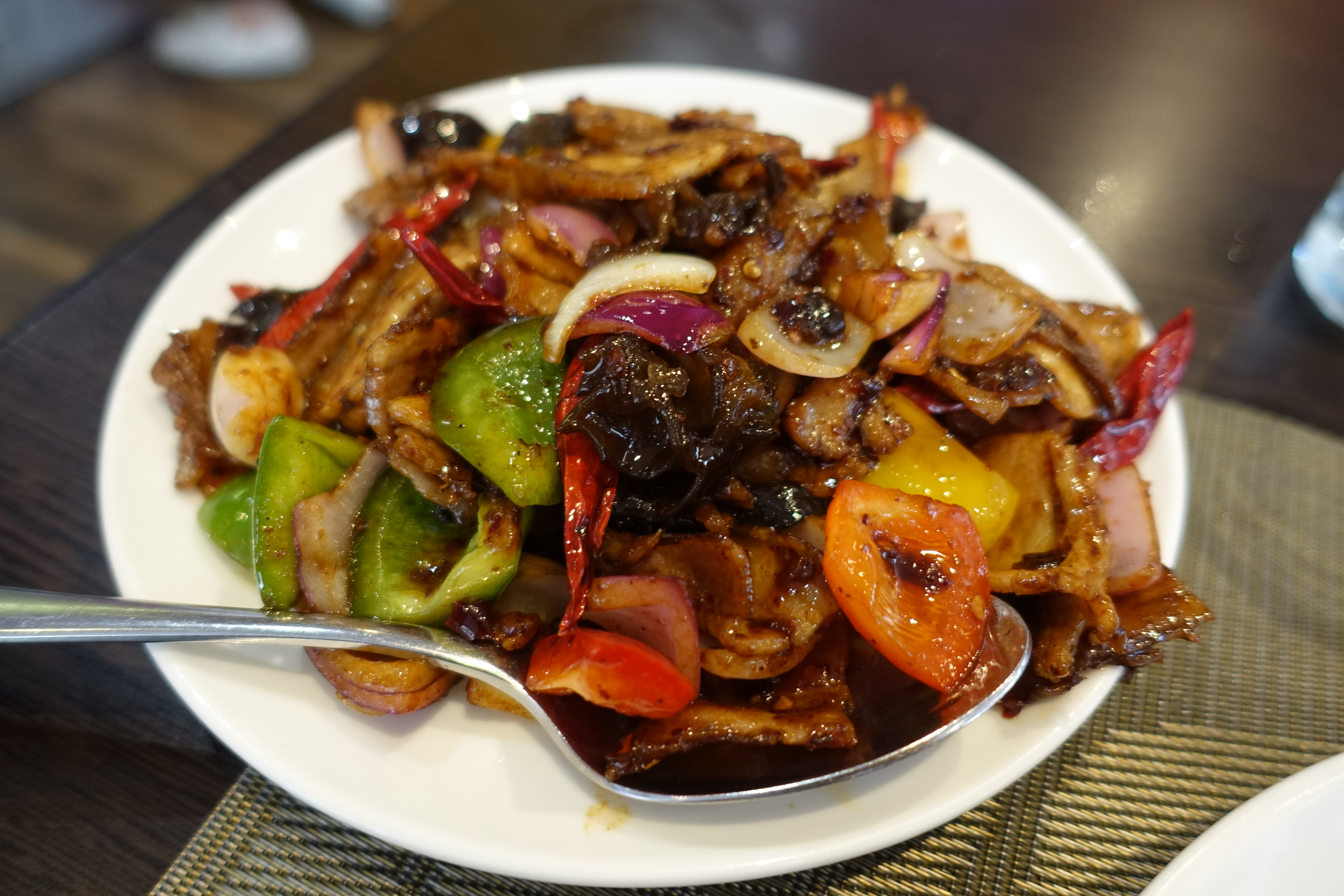

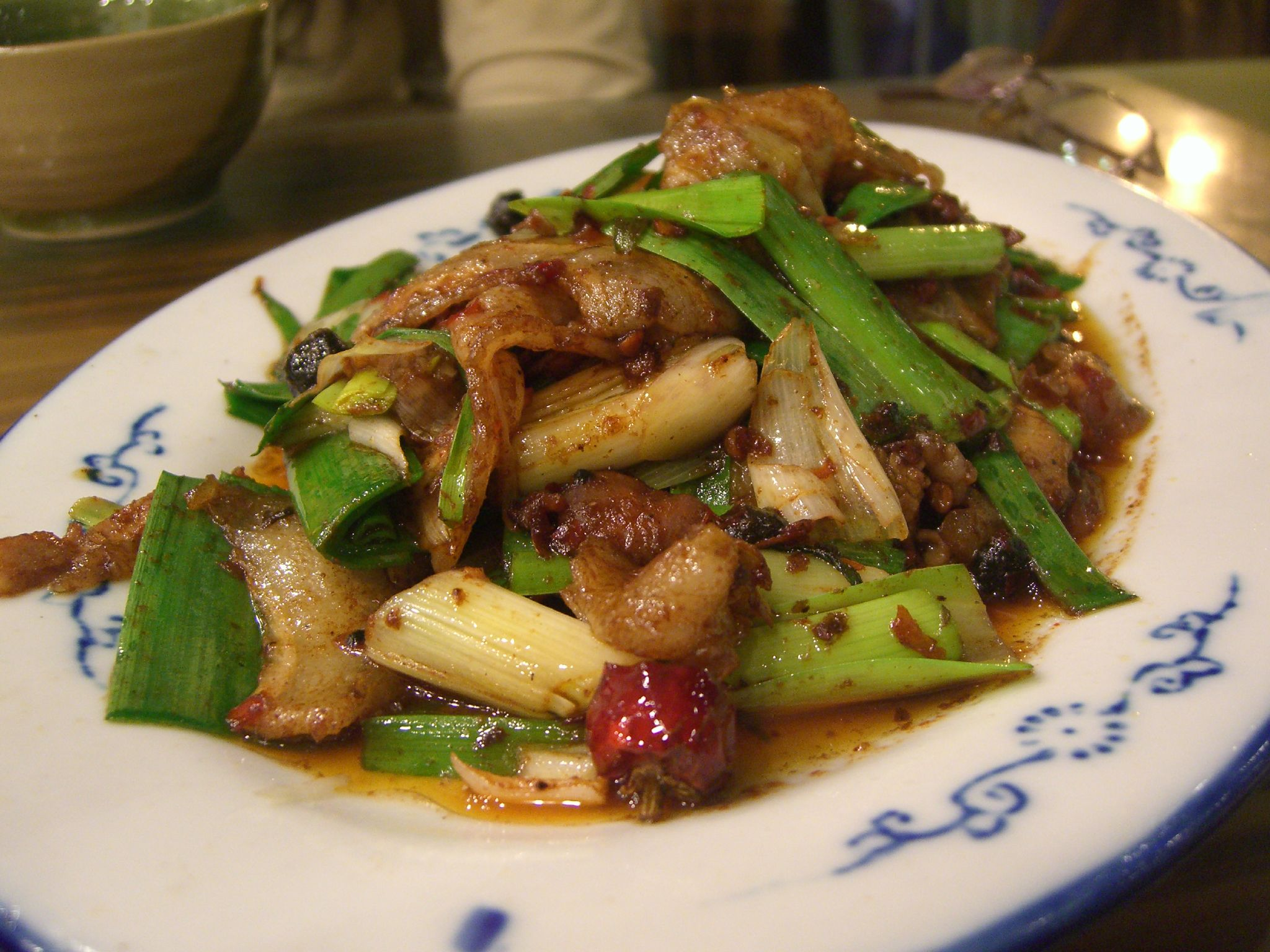

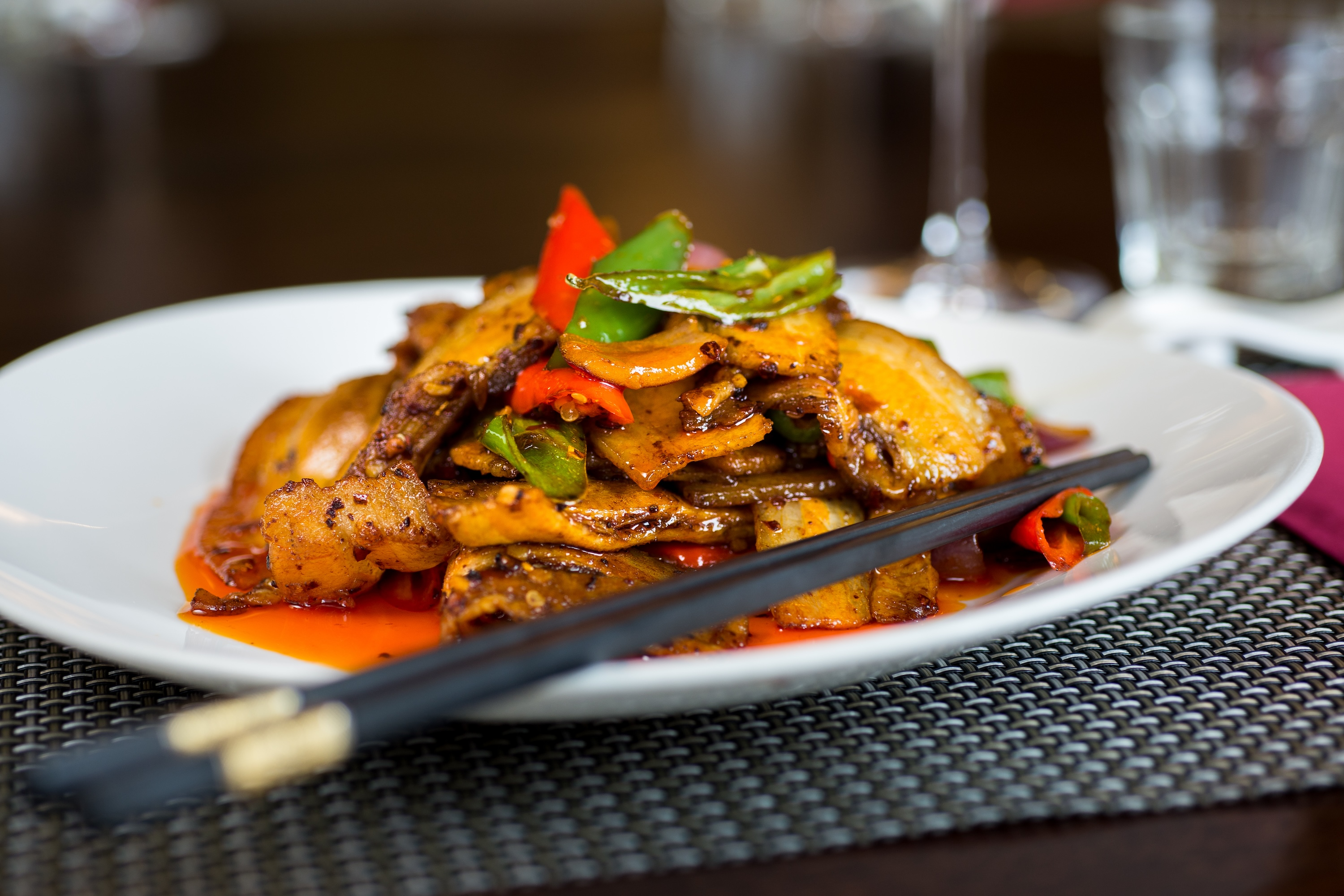
With Lao Gan Ma chili sauce

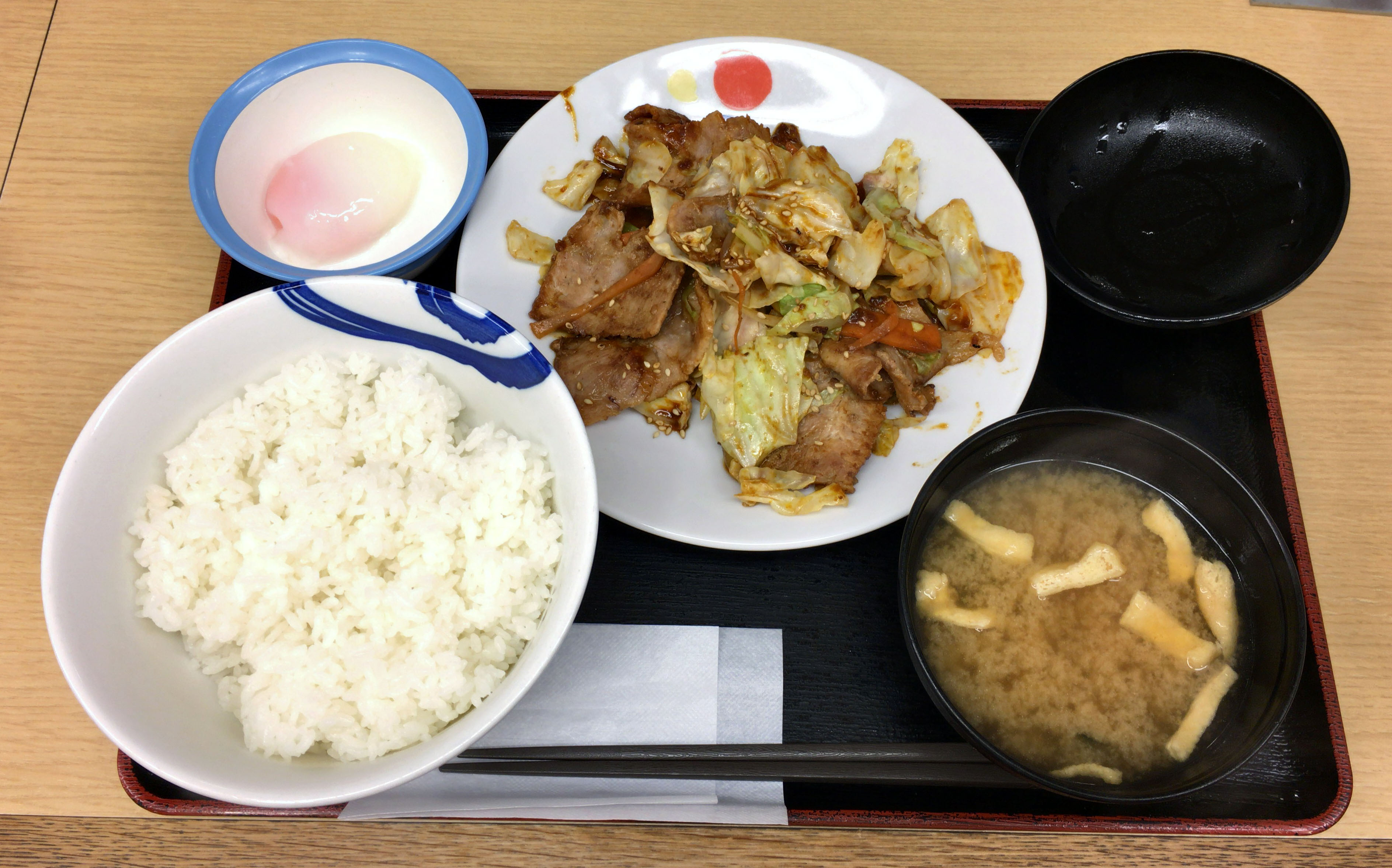
Japanese style, with rice and miso soup

== See also ==
- List of pork dishes
- Braised pork rice
- Dongpo pork
- Red braised pork belly
