= Yuxiang shredded pork =

Chinese pork dish

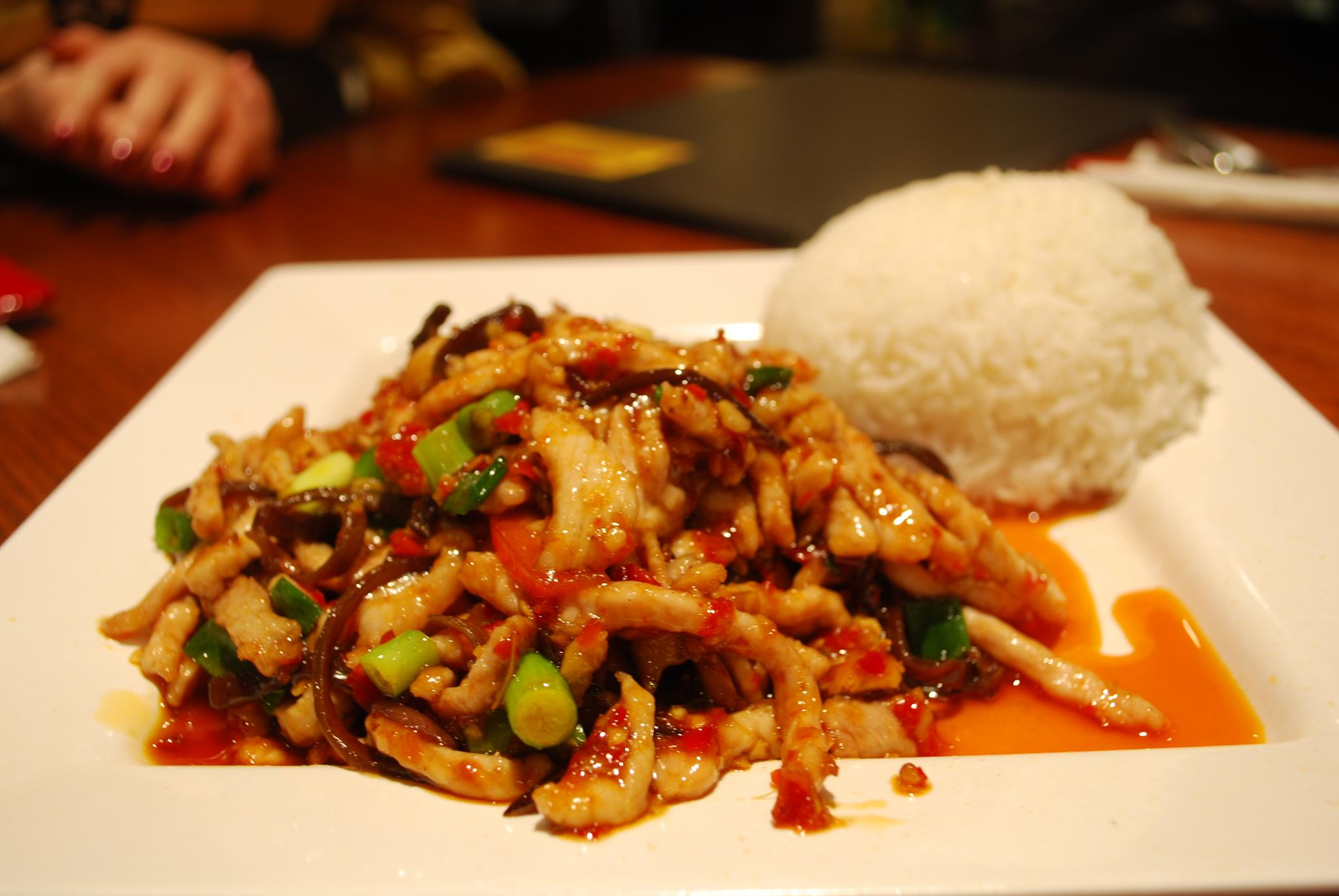
Yuxiang shredded pork from a restaurant in Melbourne

Yuxiang shredded pork (simplified Chinese: 鱼香肉丝; traditional Chinese: 魚香肉絲; pinyin: yúxiāng ròusī; sometimes translated as fish-flavored pork slices, or more vaguely as shredded pork with garlic sauce) is a common dish in Sichuan cuisine. Yuxiang is one of the main traditional flavors in Sichuan.

== Origin ==
=== Hostess theory ===
One day, while cooking dinner, it is said that a hostess who had just finished cooking fish poured the fish seasoning into a different pot, in which pork was already being made. When her husband came home from work, so hungry that he started eating immediately, he began to impatiently ask his wife how it had been made. After her husband's repeated questioning, she finally relayed what happened, and this unintentional innovation eventually spread.

=== War theory ===
It is also thought that Yuxiang shredded pork could have been created in modern China, because although the 1909 publication Chengdu Overview included 1,328 Sichuanese dishes, Yuxiang shredded pork was not one of them. Moreover, the name "Yuxiang Shredded Pork" was named after Chiang Kai-shek's chef during the Second Sino-Japanese War. Due to the shortage of materials during the war, many ingredients were also replaced with cheaper substitutes, but the dishes were sweet, spicy, salty and fresh, so they were called "Yuxiang pork shreds".

== Characteristics ==
Yuxiang (sometimes translated as "fish flavor") is made of pao la jiao (泡椒 'Sichuan pickled chili pepper'), chuan seasoning, light soy sauce, white sugar, bruised ginger and garlic. This seasoning contains no fish; the name refers to similarities to the seasoning and method that people in Sichuan use when cooking fish. The seasoning contains salty, sweet, sour, hot, and fresh flavors, making the food more delicious.

== Preparation ==
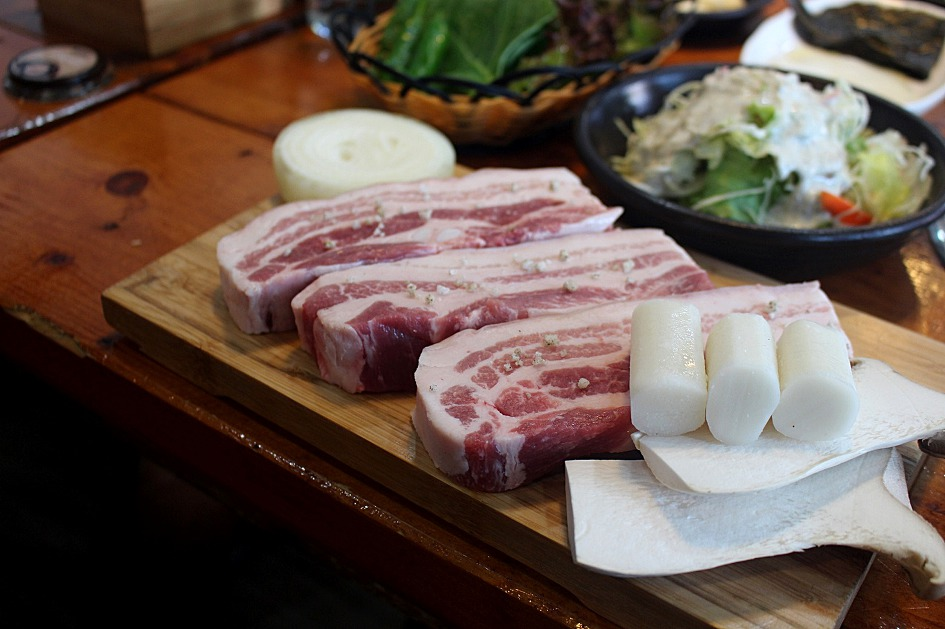
Slices of pork belly used for yuxiang shredded pork

=== Main ingredients ===
Pork, water, vinegar, ginger, garlic, pickled pepper, doubanjiang, sugar, salt, oil, cooking wine, soy sauce.

== Variations ==
=== Ingredients ===
Some common additions to yuxiang shredded pork include black fungus and carrots, among others. However, no matter what kind of changes are made to the dish, its major ingredient is always pork. To make the dish softer, pork with a 30% fat content can be used.

=== Other yuxiang-flavored dishes ===
With the improvement of people's living standards and the acceptance of fish-flavored taste gradually improved, yuxiang shredded pork spread over different parts of China. People in different regions also made different innovations in yuxiang dishes, according to their eating habits and regional characteristics. Other dishes using yuxiang have also appeared, such as yuxiang pork liver, yuxiang eggplant, and yuxiang three silk (pork silk, tofu silk, green pepper silk). (魚香三絲).

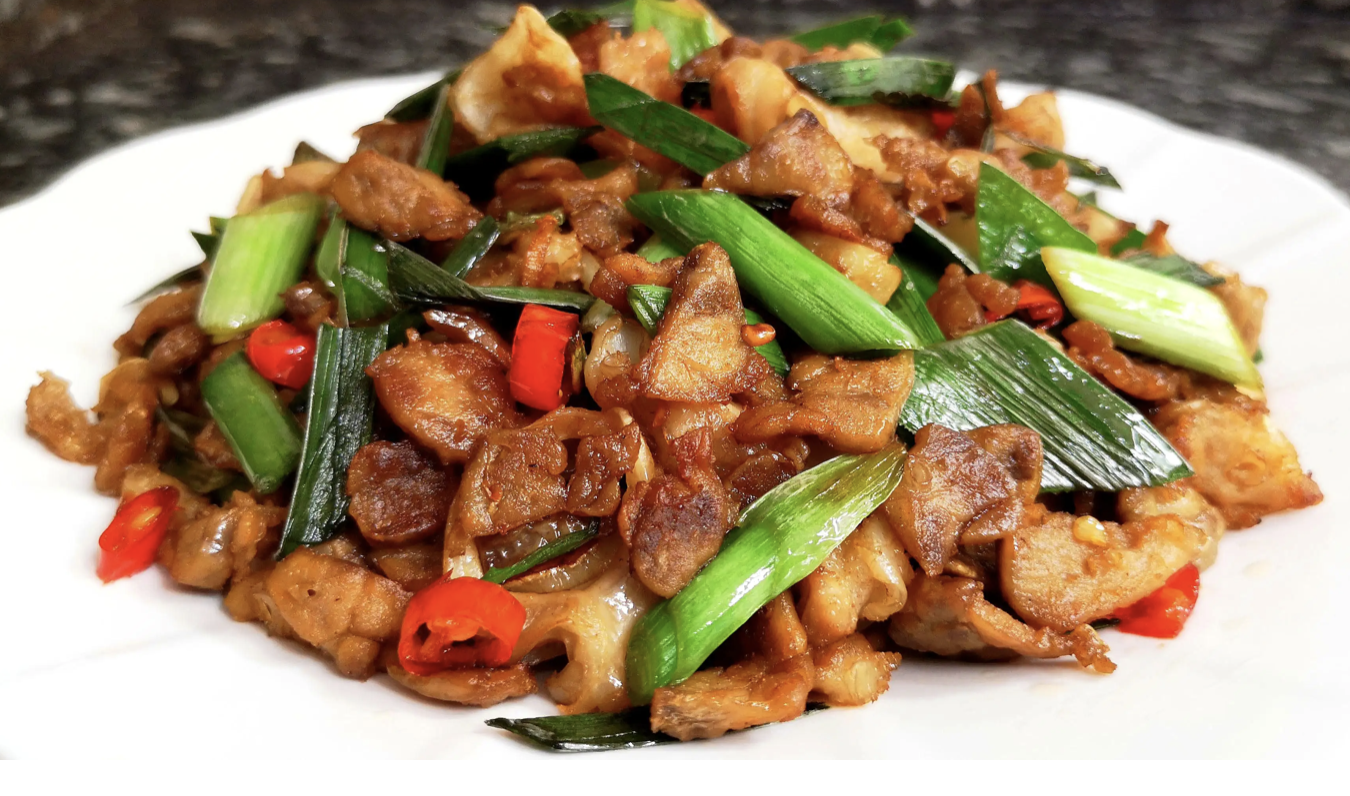

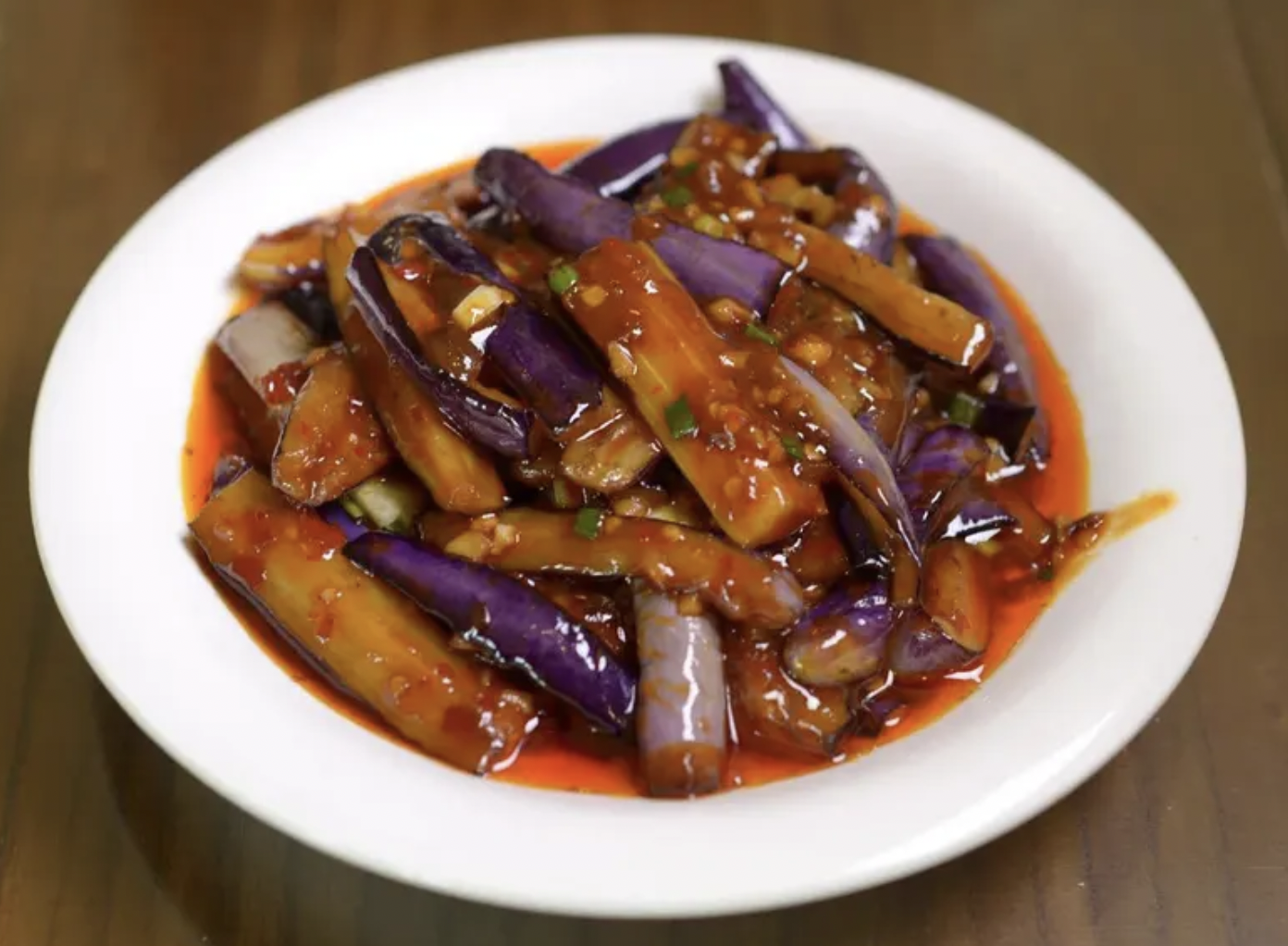

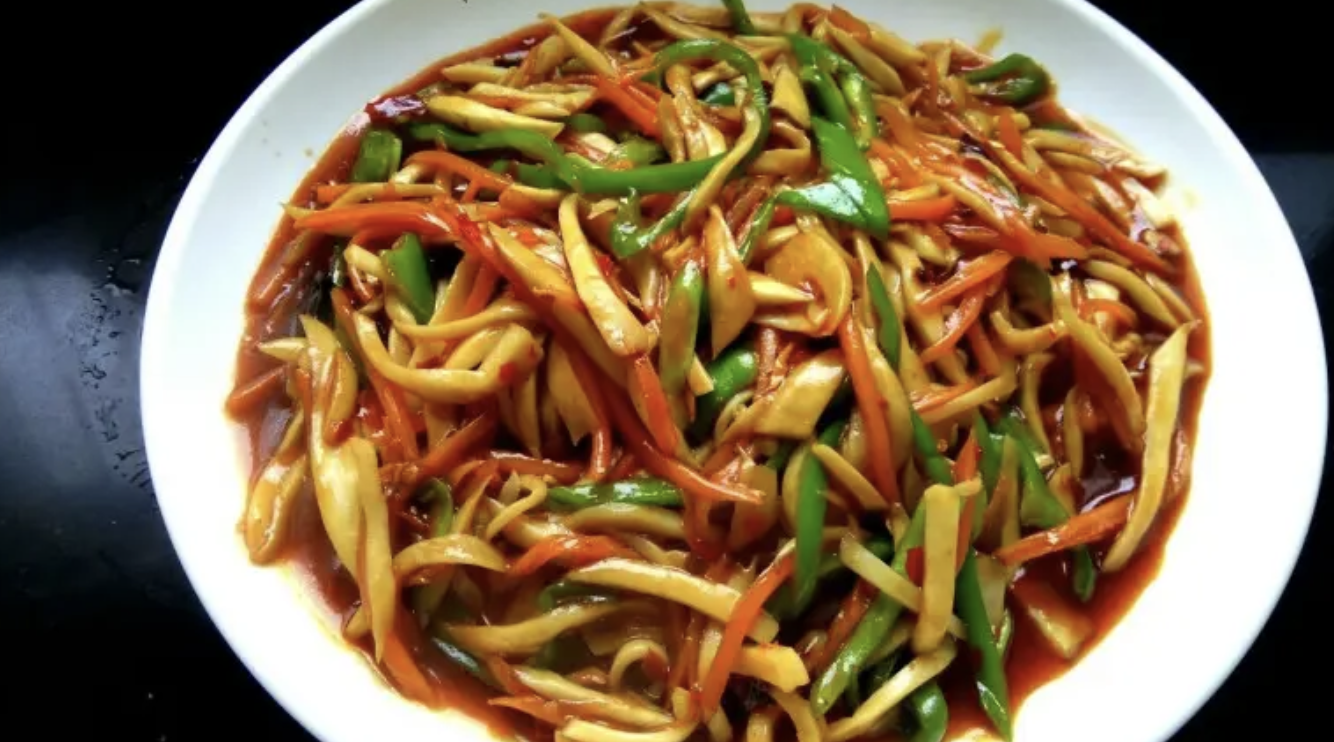

== Gallery ==
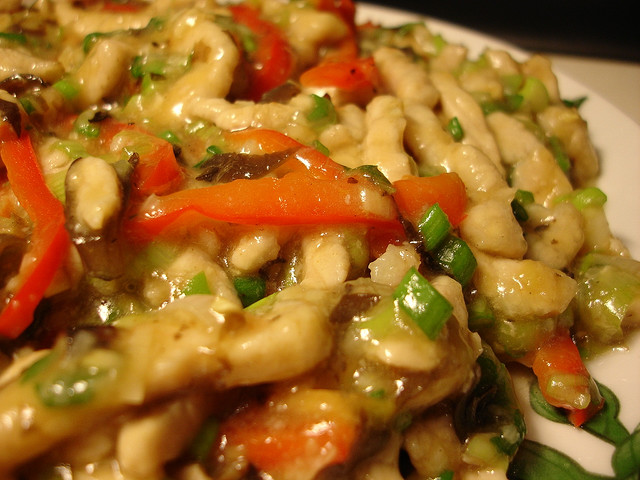

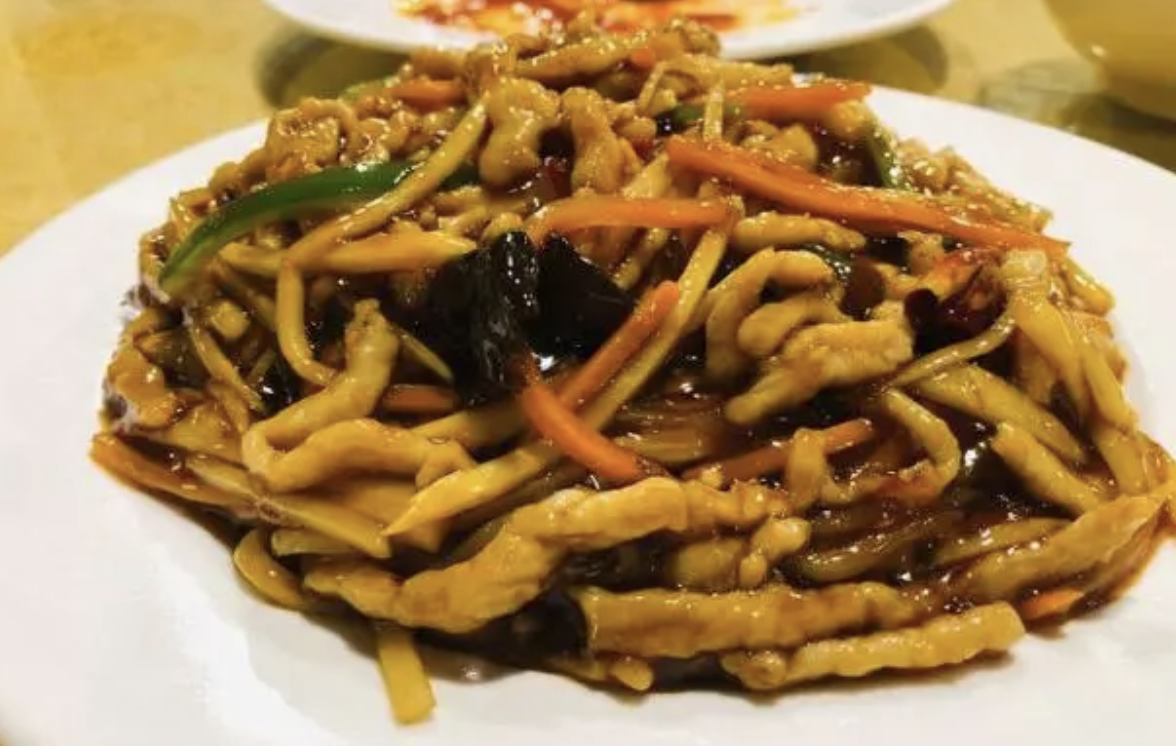

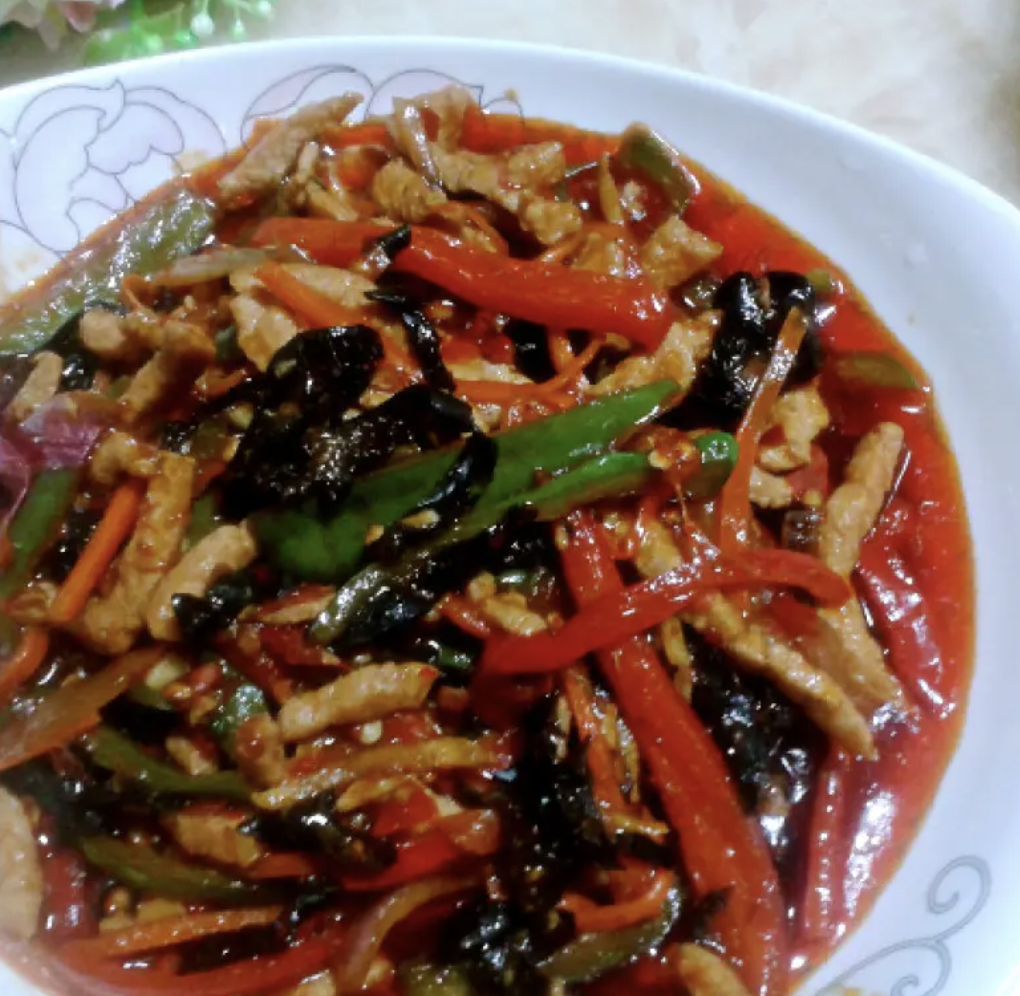

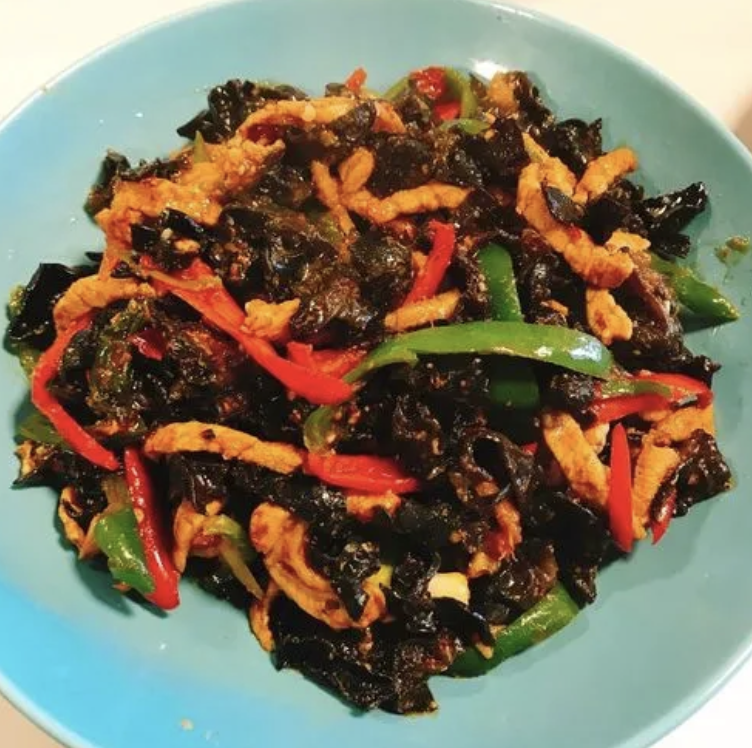

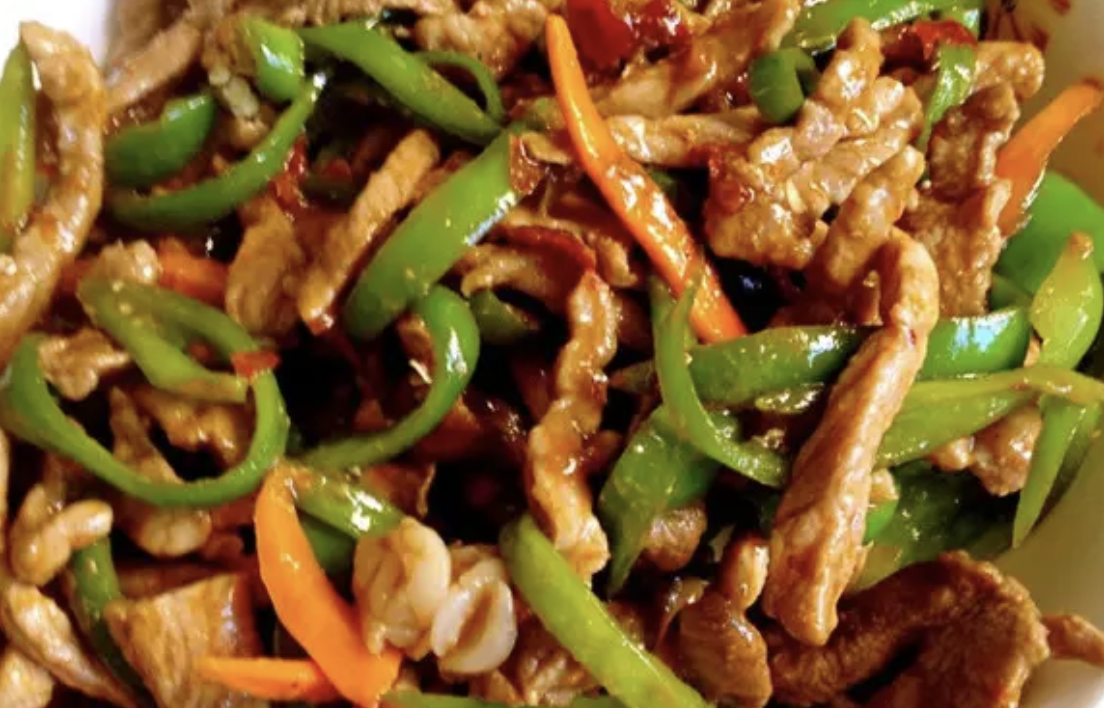

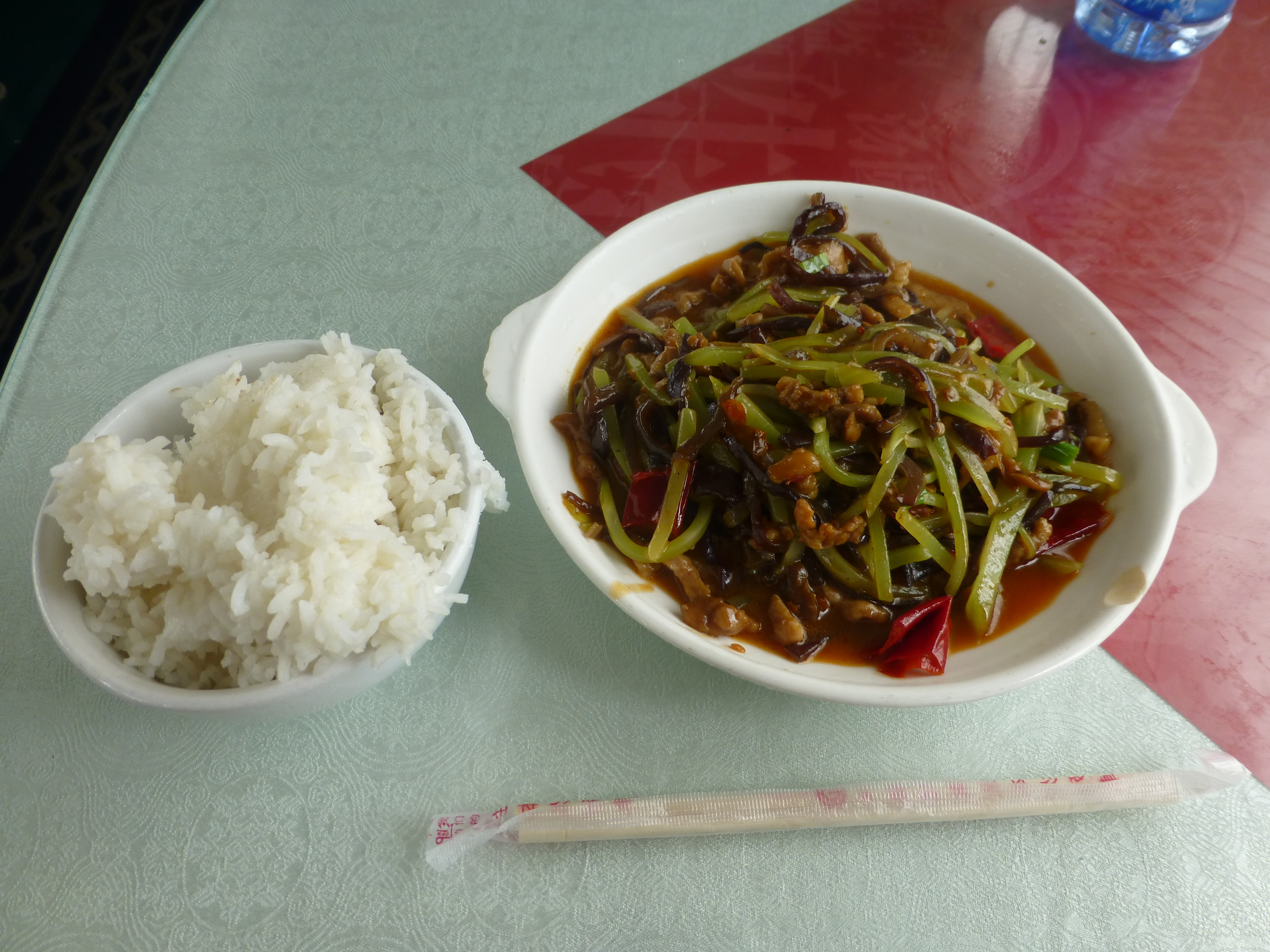

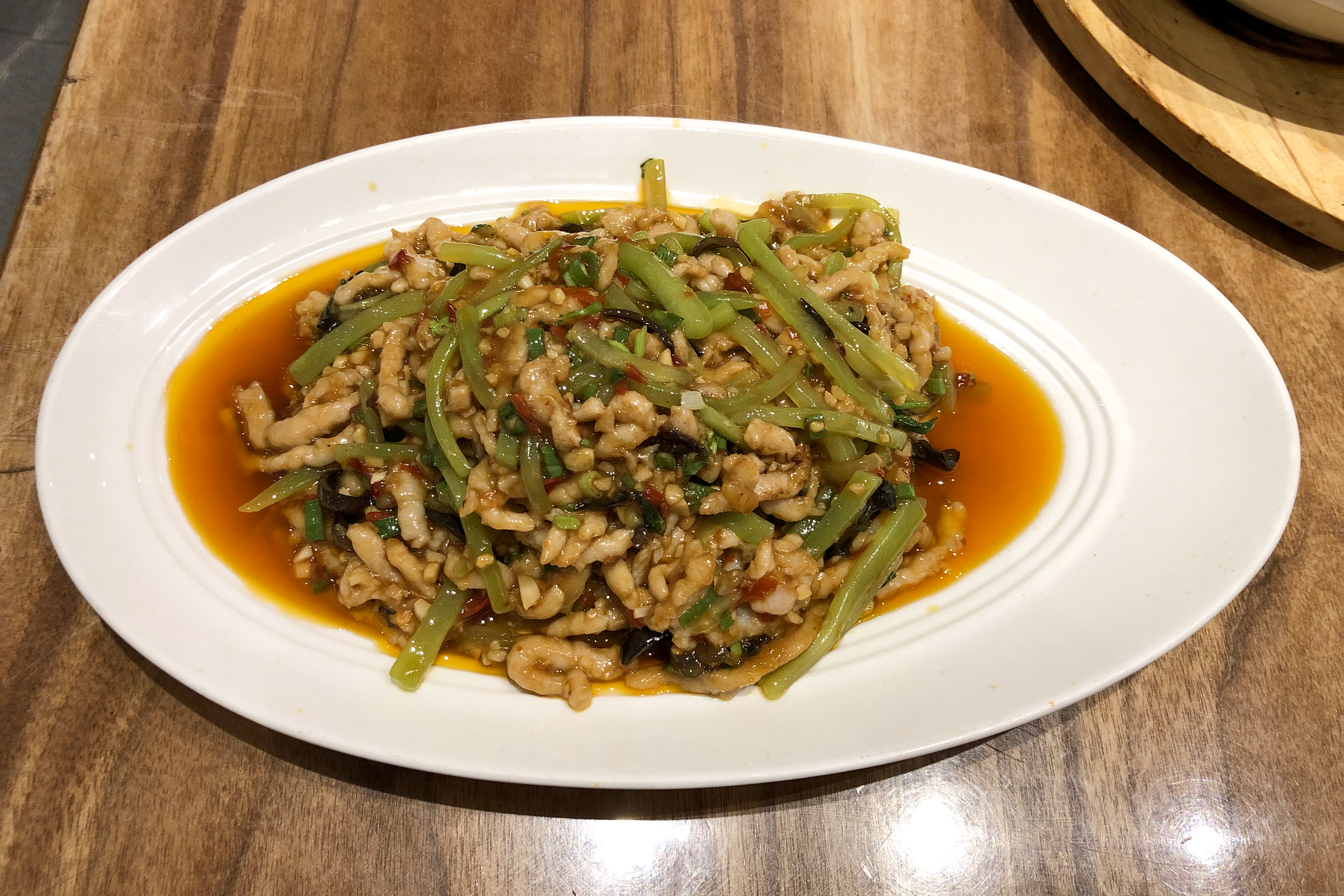

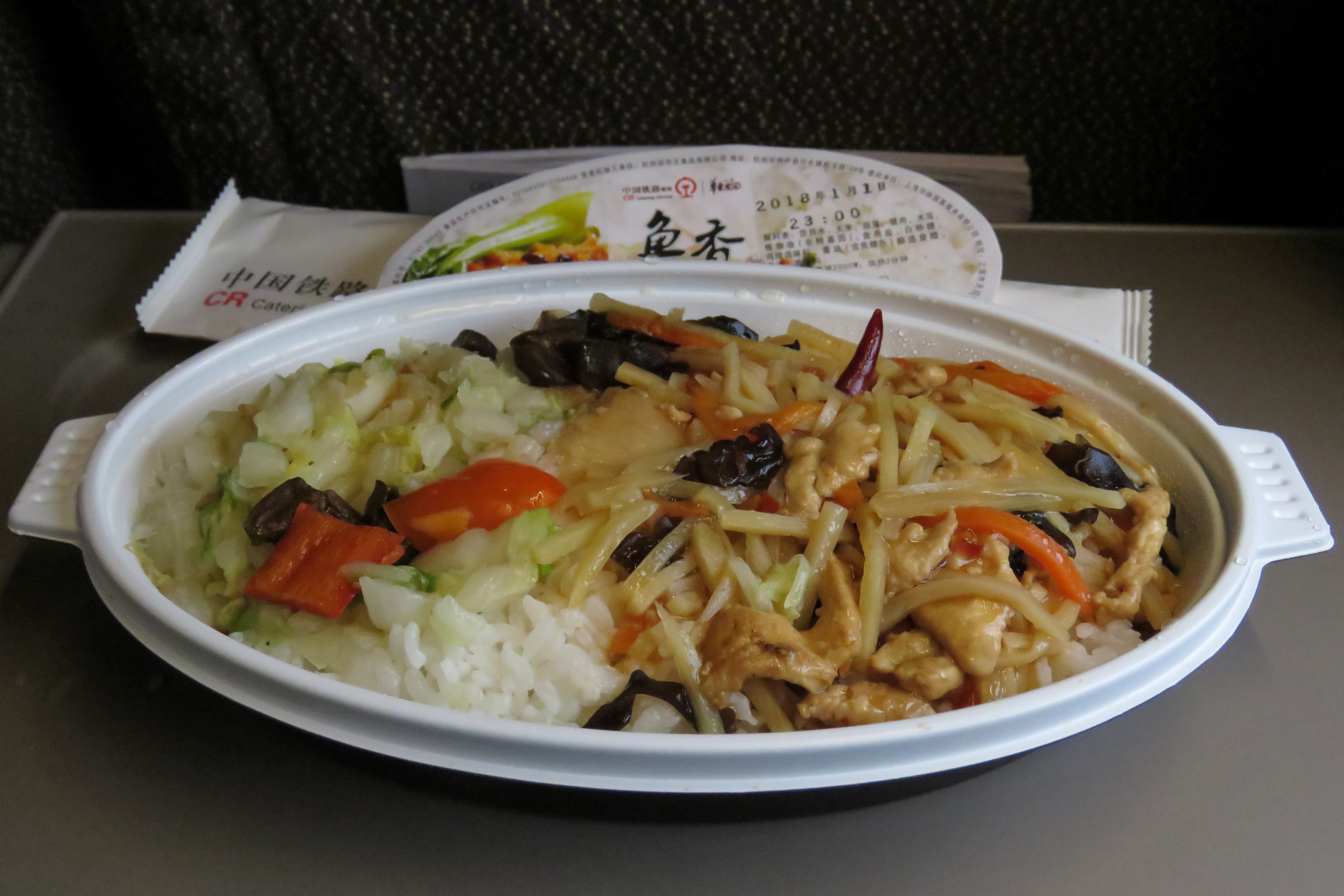

== See also ==
- List of pork dishes
