= Doubanjiang =

Chinese spicy bean paste

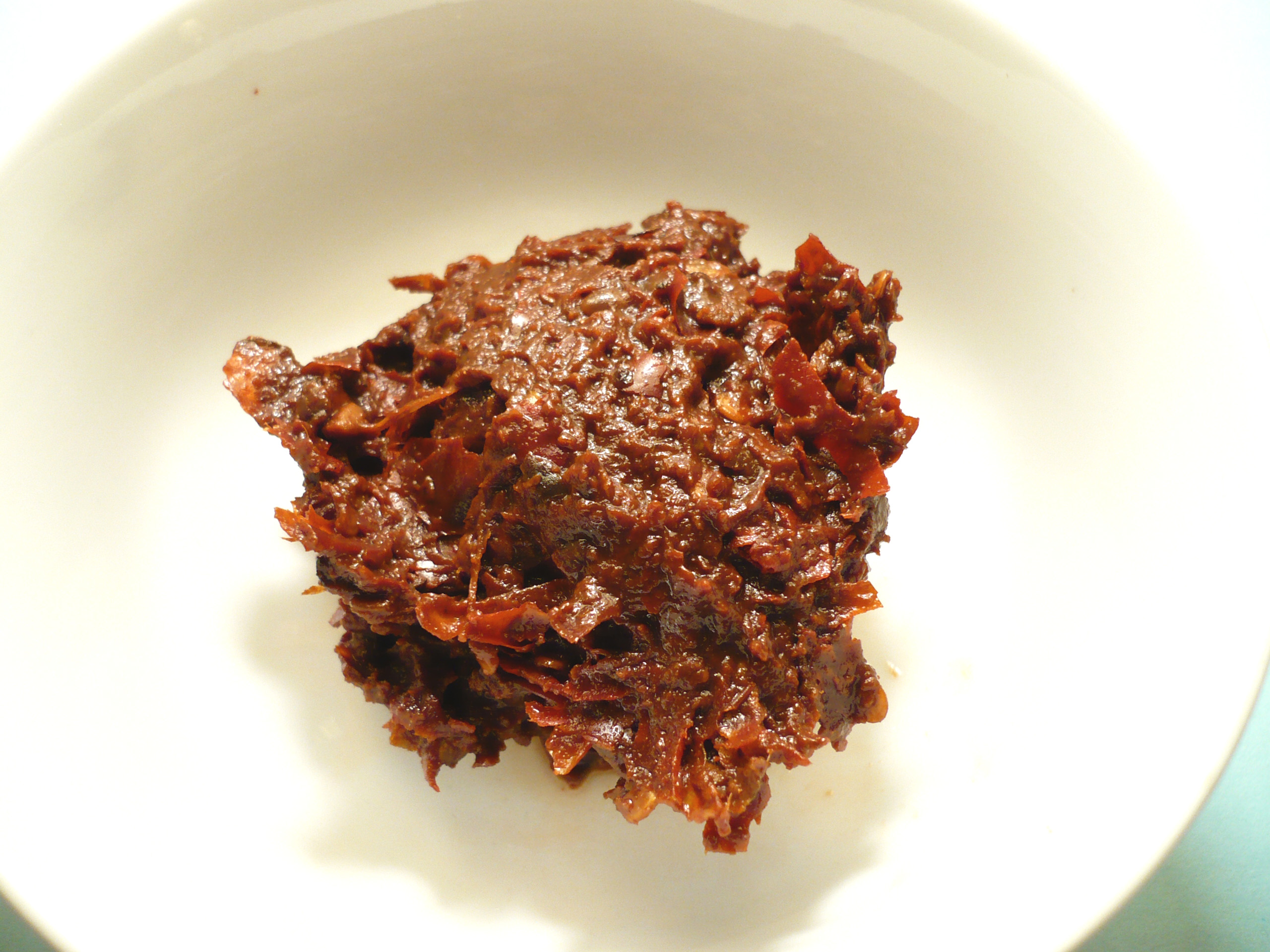
- Spicy doubanjiang
- Simplified Chinese: 豆瓣酱
- Traditional Chinese: 豆瓣醬
- Literal meaning: "bean segments sauce"
Transcriptions
Standard Mandarin
- Hanyu Pinyin: dòubànjiàng
Yue: Cantonese
- Jyutping: dau6 baan2 zeong3
Southern Min
- Hokkien POJ: tāu-pān-chiùⁿ

Doubanjiang (traditional Chinese: 豆瓣醬; simplified Chinese: 豆瓣酱; pinyin: dòubànjiàng, IPA: [tôʊpântɕjâŋ]), also known as douban, toban-djan, broad bean chili sauce, or fermented chili bean paste, is a hot and savory Chinese bean paste made from fermented broad beans (fava beans), chili peppers, soybeans, salt, and flour. Characteristically used in Sichuan cuisine, it has been called "the soul of Sichuan cuisine." Sichuan dishes such as mapo tofu, huoguo (Sichuan hotpot), yuxiang flavoring, and shuizhu all use doubanjiang as a key ingredient. Other regions have their own versions: in Guangdong and Taiwan, for instance, Sichuan doubanjiang is called la-doubanjiang (Chinese: 辣豆瓣醬, "la" (辣) meaning "hot" or "spicy") to distinguish it from plainer and milder versions.

== Main types ==
=== Pixian doubanjiang ===
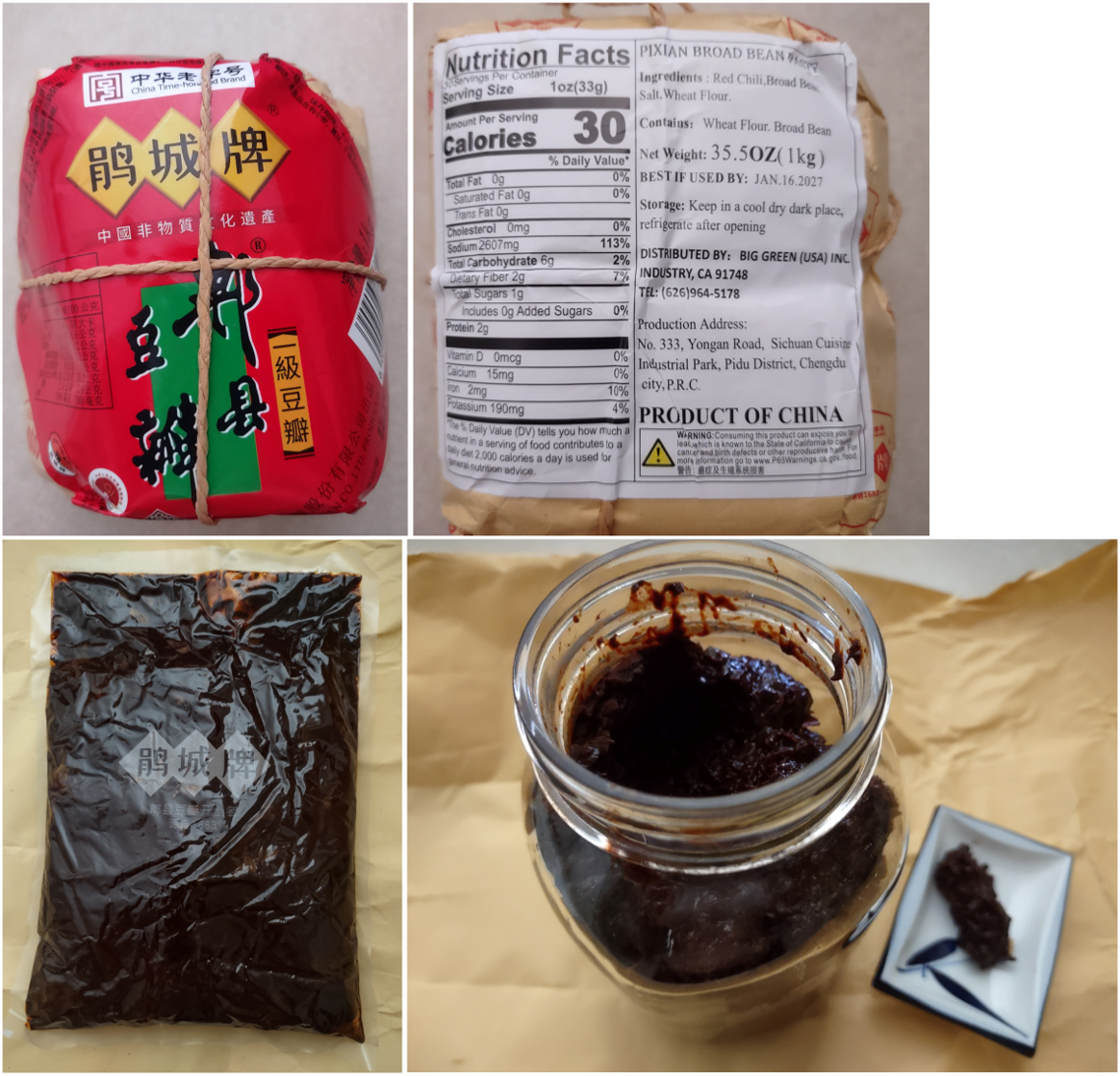
Pixian Doubanjiang as exported to the United States, in packaging and decanted into a jar

The best-known variety of doubanjiang is arguably Pixian doubanjiang (Chinese: 郫縣豆瓣醬; pinyin: Píxiàn dòubànjiàng), named for Pixian (now Pidu District, Chengdu city), Sichuan. Pixian doubanjiang is produced with a long fermentation period under sunlight (often longer than 3 years). The jingle for Pixian doubanjiang used the ancient fermentation method, "flip it over during daytime, expose it at night, sunbathe it in sunny days, cover it when it rains." (Chinese: 白天翻，晚上露，晴天曬，雨時蓋).

The distinctive flavor of Pixian doubanjiang from the place of origin, Pixian, has a close relationship with the geographical location. Pixian is located in the Chengdu plains, with more sunshine, higher air humidity, and no water pollution. The environment provides an environment for the survival of microbial flora, which is needed for the fermentation process of Pixian doubanjiang, and the unique microbial flora created the particular flavor of Pixian doubanjiang.

Pixian doubanjiang has a reddish-brown color with a deep and complex umami profile. The standard way to use it is to first fry it in oil before adding other ingredients, infusing the oil with its characteristic color and fragrance.

==== Production method ====
Pixian doubanjiang is a geographical indication (GI) protected product, with its quality assessment standards last published in 2006, up to GB/T 20560-2006. It states:

1. Ingredients
  1. Must include erjingtiao chili, sourced from Pixian and vicinity.
  2. Broad beans sourced from Sichuan or Yunnan provinces, up to GB/T 10459 standards.
  3. Water sourced from underground of Pixian, up to GB 5749 standards.
2. Procedure:
  1. Soaking and de-shelling of selected broad beans (fava beans), the making of the qu starter culture, and its fermentation into sweet broad beans for more than 6 months.
  2. Salting and crushing of the erjingtiao chili and its fermentation.
  3. Mixing of the broadbean culture with the erjingtiao chilli culture in a particular ratio, and sun-drying the mixture to allow for a further fermentation of 3 months.
  4. Then the mature Pixian doubanjiang product is yielded.
3. Quality assessment: resultant products are graded to 3 classes.
  1. Premium grade: red/brown in color, coated in glistening oil, strong aroma of the chili with rich savoriness, broadbean bits crisp and fragrant, disintegrate upon crushing, lasting aromatic aftertaste.
  2. Grade I: light red/brown in color, partially coated in glistening oil, chili aroma and savoriness moderately rich.
  3. Grade II: red or light red/brown in color, glistens but not coated in oil, broadbean bits lacking fragrance, no lasting aftertaste.
4. Quantitative analysis: total acids (in lactic acids) <= 2.0 g/100g. Salt (in NaCl) 15-22g/100g.

The optimal process conditions for doubanjiang are 56% water, 10% added salt, 40 °C fermentation temperature, and 40 hours of qu starter-making time.

=== Others ===
Doubanjiang may be produced at home with just soybeans, salt and spices. Normal home-made or factory-produced doubanjiang rarely has the long fermentation time that gives the Pixian version its character.

Hongyou doubanjiang (Chinese: 红油豆瓣酱, doubanjiang in red chili oil) is sometimes confused with Pixian doubanjiang. Hongyou doubanjiang is not fermented, it usually contains extra spices, and the chili oil can be made from any chili variety.

Binzhou (Binzhou, Shandong) watermelon doubanjiang (Chinese: 滨州西瓜豆瓣酱) is a non-spicy doubanjiang variety whose ingredients include soybeans, watermelon, flour, salt, etc. Binzhou watermelon doubanjiang is often fermented, and processed without any chemical additives.

Doubanjiang used outside of Sichuan is often not spicy.

== Dishes ==
Doubanjiang can be used for many dishes. Pixian doubanjiang is known as the "soul of Sichuan cuisine" by reputation. Doubanjiang can be used to make mapo tofu, twice-cooked pork, Sichuan hot pot, yuxiang shredded pork, Kung Pao chicken, stir-fried pork, shuizhu pork, and other dishes.

== See also ==
- Fermented bean paste
- Doenjang
- List of fermented foods
- List of fermented soy products
- Douchi (Chinese fermented black beans)
- Ssamjang
- Gochujang
