= Shuizhu =

Chinese cuisine dish

- Chinese: 水煮
- Cuisine: Sichuan cuisine

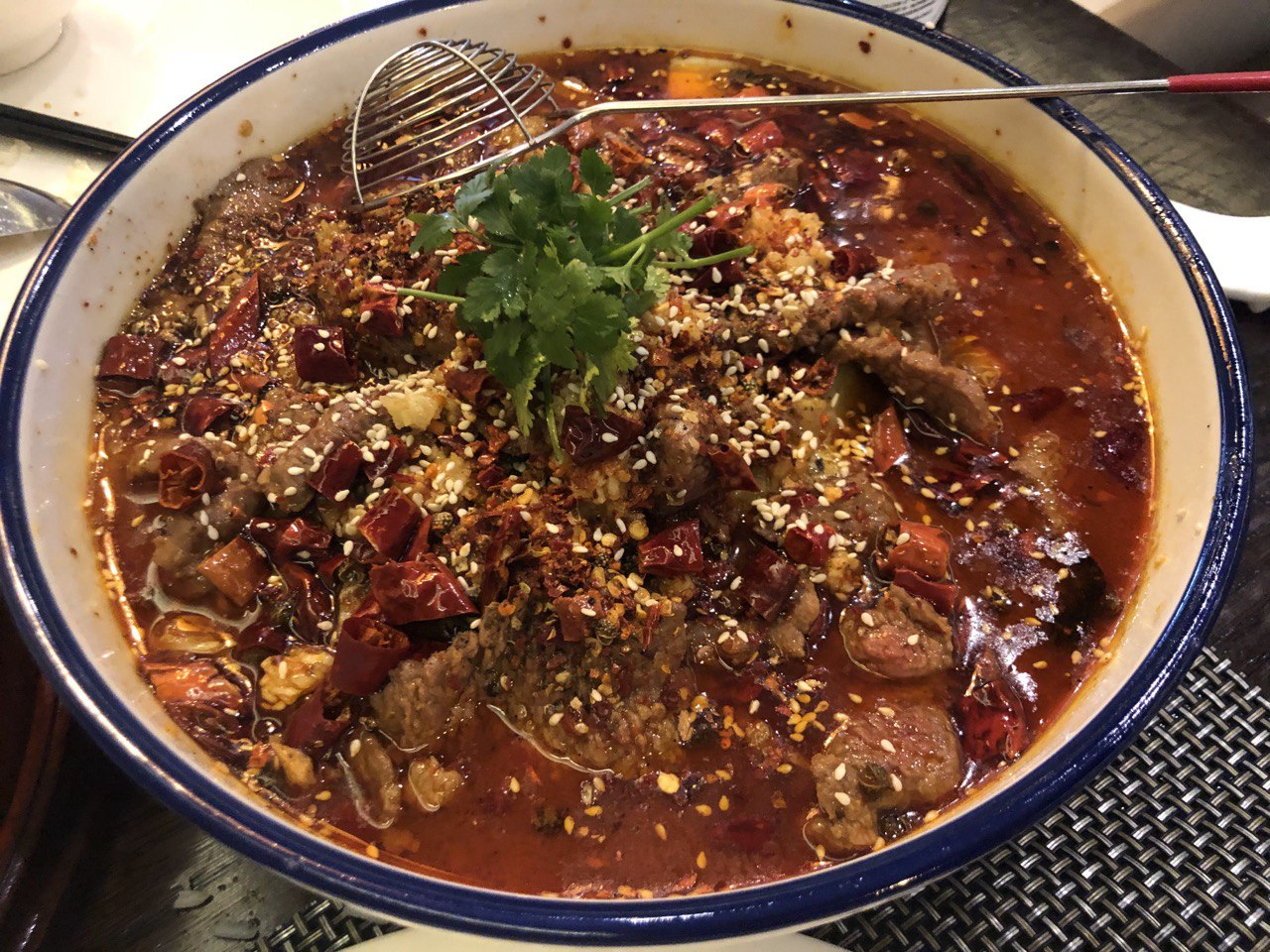
A plate of shuizhu made with beef

Shuizhu (Chinese: 水煮; pinyin: shuǐzhǔ, [ʂwěɪ ʈʂù ɻôʊ pʰjɛ̂n]) is a Chinese dish which originated from Sichuan cuisine; its name literally means "water-boiled (meat)". The dish consists of meat, chili pepper, and vegetable oil.

The meat is prepared with water, starch, and a slight amount of salt. Boiled vegetables are placed at the bottom of the serving bowl or dish. The prepared raw meat is poached in water that is heated to boiling for 20–30 seconds, just enough to remove rawness yet preserving the meat's tenderness. Then it is drained and put in the serving dish with vegetables. Minced dried chili, Sichuan pepper, minced garlic, and other seasonings are spread over the meat. Vegetable oil is heated in a pan nearly to the smoking point, then poured over the prepared meat and vegetables.

This dish maintains tenderness of the meat by poaching it instead of stir-frying. It offers a combination of tender meat, freshness of vegetable, hot spicy flavor of chili pepper, and numbing sensation of Sichuan pepper.
