= Sichuan cuisine =

Cuisine originating from the Sichuan province of China

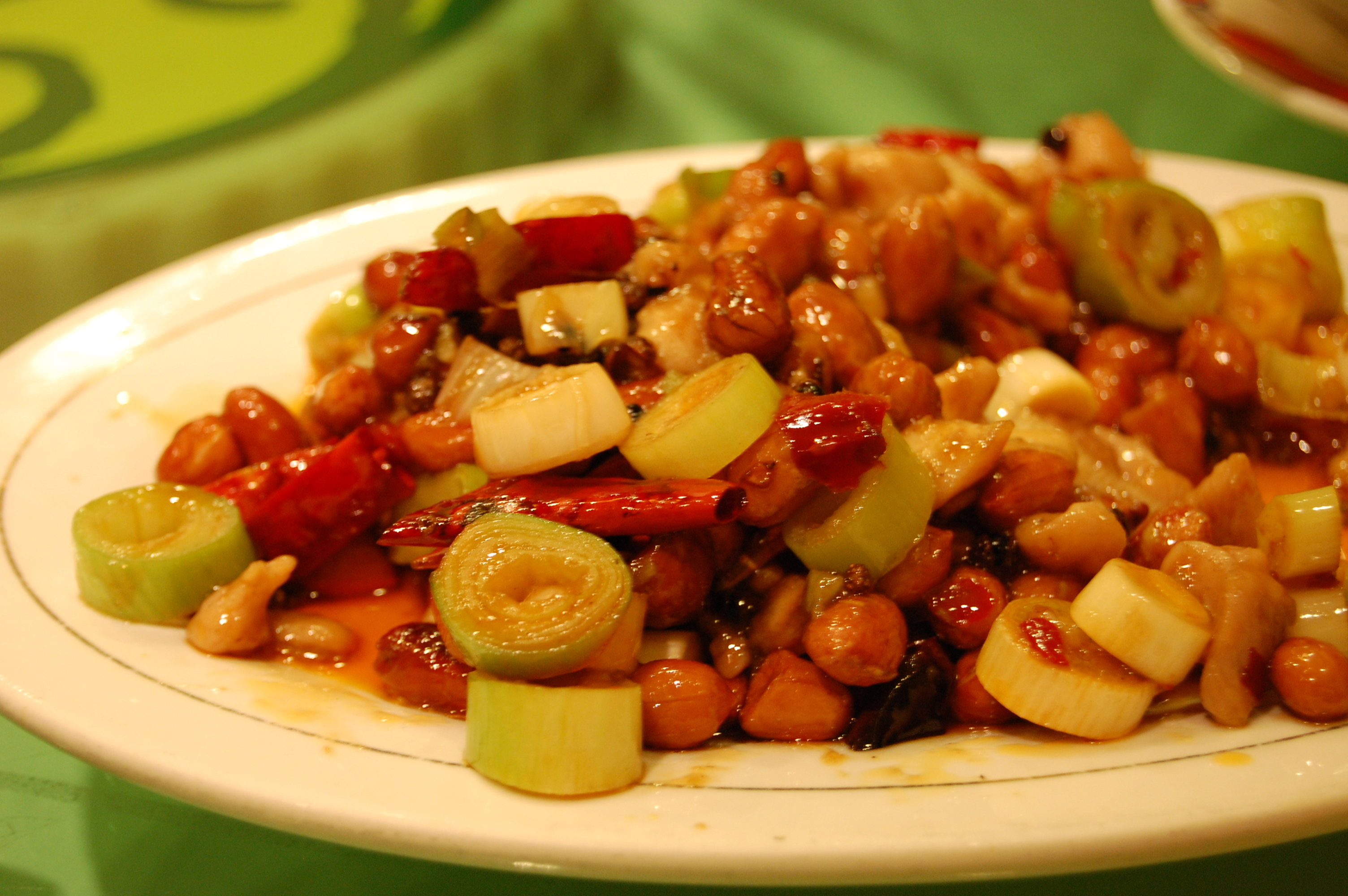
- Kung Pao chicken
- Chinese: 四川菜
Transcriptions
Standard Mandarin
- Hanyu Pinyin: Sìchuān cài

Chuan cuisine
- Chinese: 川菜
Transcriptions
Standard Mandarin
- Hanyu Pinyin: Chuān cài

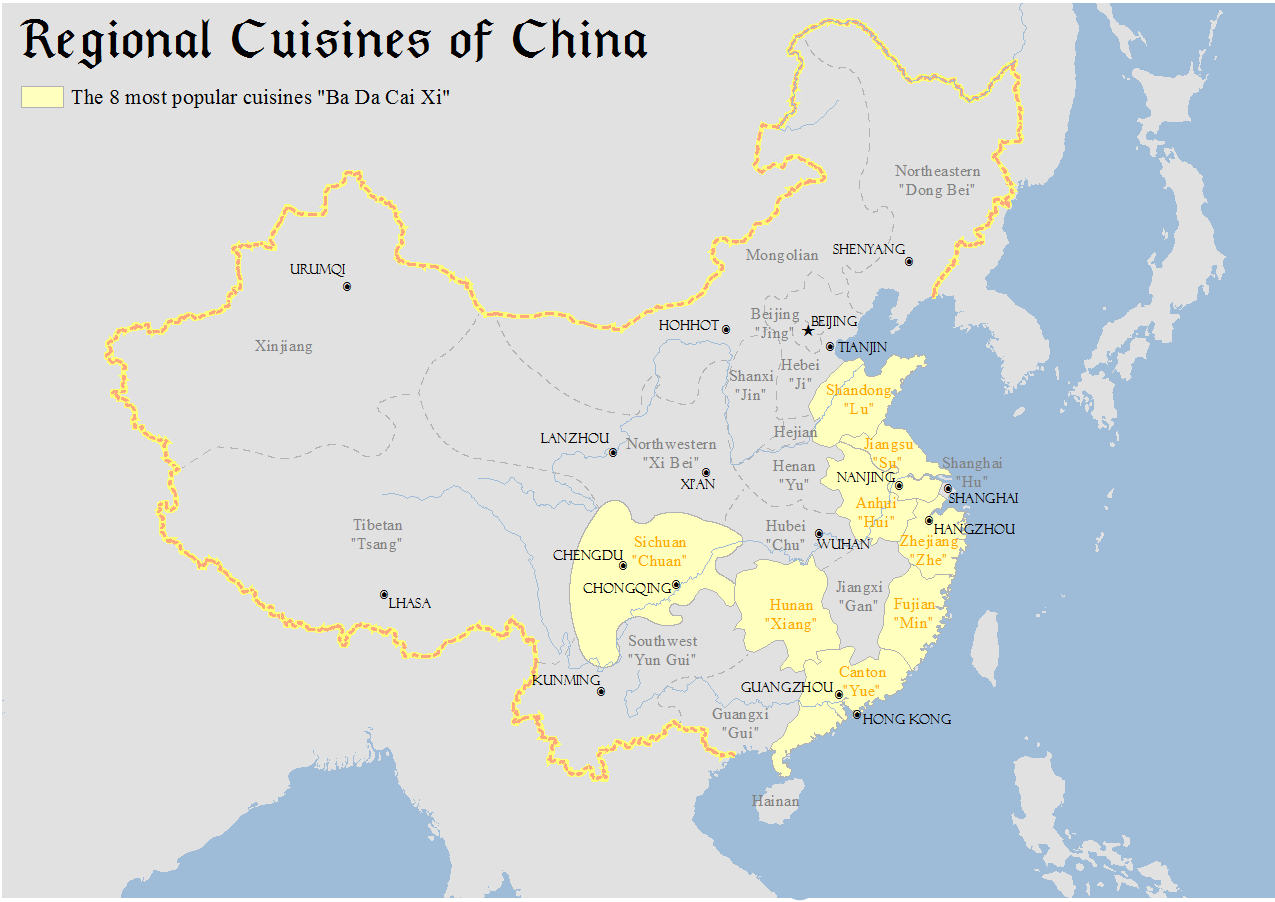
Geographic extent of Sichuan cuisine

Sichuan cuisine or Sichuanese cuisine, alternatively romanized as Szechwan cuisine or Szechuan cuisine (Chinese: 四川, Standard Mandarin pronunciation: [sɨ̂.ʈʂʰwán]) is a style of Chinese cuisine originating from Sichuan province and the neighboring Chongqing municipality. Chongqing was formerly a part of Sichuan until 1997; thus, there is a great deal of cultural overlap between the two administrative divisions. There are many regional, local variations of Sichuanese cuisine within Sichuan and Chongqing.

The four major substyles of Sichuanese cuisine include Shanghebang, Xiaohebang, Xiahebang, and Buddhist vegetarian style. Shanghebang is represented by Chengdu and Leshan; Xiaohebang by Zigong (which is also known for a genre of dishes called yanbangcai), Yibin, Luzhou, and Neijiang; and Xiahebang by Chongqing and Dazhou.

Sichuanese cuisine is renowned for fiery and bold tastes, particularly the pungency and spiciness resulting from liberal use of garlic and chilis, as well as the unique flavors of Sichuan (Szechuan) pepper. Some examples are Kung Pao chicken and Yuxiang shredded pork.

UNESCO declared Chengdu, the capital of Sichuan Province, a city of gastronomy in 2011.

== History ==
Sichuan cuisine is thought to have originated during the Spring and Autumn period and the Warring States period, the beginning of Qin and Han dynasties, and the formation of classical Sichuan cuisine in Han and Jin dynasties. In the Tang and Song Dynasties, Sichuan cuisine was developed further, and Sichuan restaurants spread throughout Kaifeng and Lin'an. During the Song dynasty, Sichuan cuisine became a distinct cuisine.

During the Ming and Qing dynasties, Sichuan cuisine developed further until the foundation of the modern Republic of China. Modern Sichuan cuisine eventually formed the characteristics of "rich variety", and "strong taste and spicy".

Chili peppers were introduced into Sichuan and widely used in Sichuan cuisine during the Kangxi period, which was a watershed between ancient Sichuan cuisine and modern Sichuan cuisine. The book "Flower Mirror" written and published by Chen Xiuzi in 1688 states in volume five: "Pepper, a sea mad vine, commonly known as spicy eggplant……the most spicy, used by many people, very fine, winter moon to replace pepper. [sic]"

In the Middle Ages, Sichuan welcomed Middle Eastern crops, such as broad beans, sesame and walnuts. Since the 16th century, the list of major crops in Sichuan has even been lengthened by New World newcomers. The chili pepper is native to Mexico, and likely arrived in Sichuan province from India or Macau, complementing the traditional Sichuan (Szechuan) peppercorns. Other newcomers from the New World included corn, which largely replaced millet; white potatoes introduced by Catholic missions; and sweet potatoes. The population of Sichuan was cut by about 75% in the wars from the Ming dynasty to the Qing dynasty. Settlers from the adjacent Hunan Province brought their cooking styles with them.

Sichuan is colloquially known as the "heavenly country" due to its abundance of food and natural resources. One ancient Chinese account declared that the "people of Sichuan uphold good flavors, and they are fond of hot and spicy taste." Most Sichuan dishes are spicy, although a typical meal includes nonspicy dishes to cool the palate. Sichuan cuisine is composed of seven basic tastes: sweet, sour, numbingly spicy, spicy, bitter, fragrant/aromatic, and salty. Sichuan food is divided into five different types: sumptuous banquet, ordinary banquet, popular foods, household-style food and snacks. Milder versions of Sichuan dishes remain a staple of American Chinese cuisine.

Wang Dayu, in the Sichuan cuisine history strategy by the Committee on Literature and History of the CPPCC, considers Sichuan cuisine to be roughly divided into Chengdu Bang, Chongqing Bang, Dahe Bang, and Xiaohe Bang categories.

== Categories of Sichuan cuisine ==
Shanghe Bang Sichuan cuisine in Chengdu, and Leshan-centered areas in the west of Sichuan, is characterized by being rich in seasoning and having a relatively light taste. It often uses spicy bean paste and sugar for flavoring, and is the most widely known Sichuan cuisine.

Shanghe Bangchuan cuisine is based on traditional classical recipes. It has a mild taste and flavor while concentrating on premium dishes such as royal and official banquet dishes.

Xiaohe Bangchuan cuisine is centered on Zigong in southern Sichuan, and includes Yibin cuisine, Luzhou cuisine, and Neijiang cuisine, which are characterized by their rich tastes. Zigong Yanbang dishes are divided into three branches: salty commercial dishes, salty industrial dishes and hall dishes, with a spicy taste, mala, and sweet and sour taste.

== Features ==
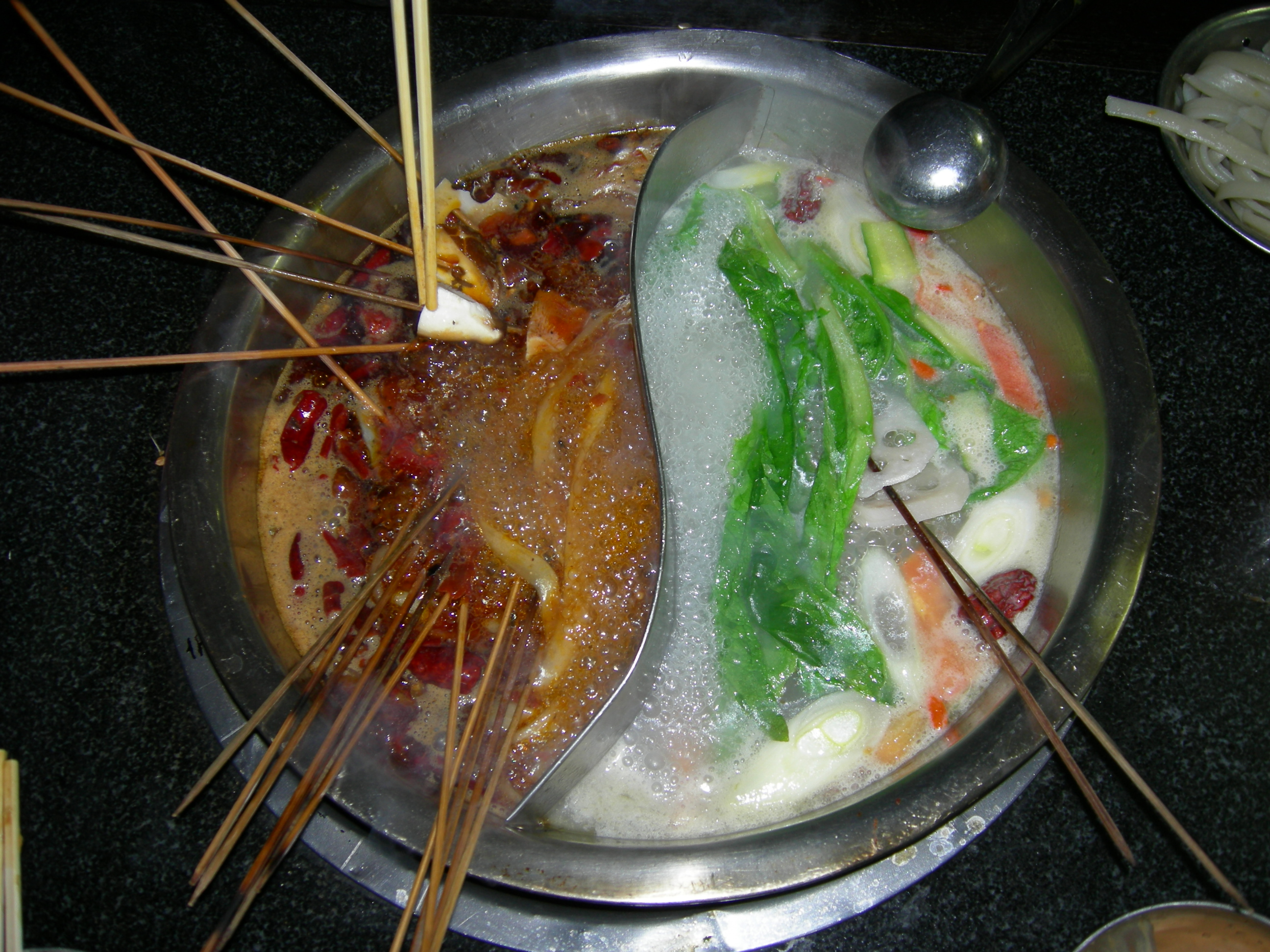
Chili hotpot characteristic of Sichuan cuisine

The complex topography of Sichuan Province, including its mountains, hills, plains, plateaus and the Sichuan Basin, has shaped its food customs with versatile and distinct ingredients.

Abundant rice and vegetables are produced from the fertile Sichuan Basin, whereas a wide variety of herbs, mushrooms and other fungi prosper in the highland regions. Pork is overwhelmingly the most common type of meat consumed. Beef is somewhat more common in Sichuan cuisine than it is in other Chinese cuisines, perhaps due to the prevalence of oxen in the region. Sichuan cuisine also uses various cow and pork offal as ingredients, including intestine, arteries, head, tongue, skin and liver. Rabbit meat is much more popular in Sichuan than elsewhere in China. It is estimated that the Sichuan Basin and Chongqing area are responsible for about 70 percent of China's total rabbit meat consumption. The salt produced from Sichuan salt springs and wells does not contain iodine, which led to issues with goiter before the 20th century.

Sichuan cuisine often contains food preserved through pickling, salting and drying. Preserved dishes are generally served as spicy dishes with heavy application of chili oil.

=== Ingredients ===
The most unique and important spice in Sichuan cuisine is the Sichuan (Szechuan) pepper (花椒; huājiāo; 'flower pepper'), which has an intense, fragrant citruslike taste and produces a notably distinct "numbingly spicy" (麻; má) sensation in the mouth. Other commonly used spices in Sichuan cuisine are garlic, chili peppers, ginger, and star anise.

Broad bean chili paste (豆瓣醬; dòubànjiàng) is another important seasoning. It is an essential component in famous dishes such as Mapo tofu and twice-cooked pork.

Sichuan cuisine is the origin of several prominent sauces/flavors widely used in modern Chinese cuisine, including:

- Yuxiang (魚香)
- Mala (麻辣)
- Guaiwei (怪味)

Other examples of flavor combinations including spicy and hot (Mala), fish flavor (Yuxiang), hot and sour, the five spices (Wuxiang; 五香), ginger juice, mashed garlic, sweet and sour, spice salt (Jiaoyan; 椒鹽), dried tangerine or orange peel (Chenpi; 陳皮), burnt chili, pot-stewed fowl (Lu; 滷味), odd flavor (Guaiwei; 怪味), and other recombinations of these seasonings.

== Notable foods ==
English	Image	Traditional Chinese	Simplified Chinese	Pinyin	Notes
Ants climbing a tree		螞蟻上樹	蚂蚁上树	mǎyǐ shàng shù	So called because the dish has bits of ground meat clinging to noodles, evoking an image of ants climbing a tree
Bon bon chicken		棒棒鷄 / 棒棒雞	棒棒鸡	bàngbàng jī	Chicken mixed with dark, toasty sesame sauce. So-called from the sound of the cleavers being hammered into the chicken to shred it.
Braised pork ribs with konjac		魔芋燒排骨	魔芋烧排骨	móyù shāo páigǔ	
Chili oil wontons		紅油抄手	红油抄手	hóng yóu chāoshǒu	
Dandan noodles		擔擔麵	担担面	dàndàn miàn	Originally a Chengdu street snack sold by men with "carrying poles" (dan).
Dry chili chicken		辣子雞	辣子鸡	làzǐjī	
Fish with pickled mustard greens		酸菜魚	酸菜鱼	suān cài yú	Shredded chicken breast, pork, or any other meat ingredients can be substituted for the fish fillets.
Fragrant and spicy fish slices		香辣魚片	香辣鱼片	xiāng là yú piàn	
Hot and sour noodles		酸辣麵, 酸辣粉	酸辣面, 酸辣粉	suān là miàn, suān là fěn	Typically a vegetarian noodle dish primarily made with brassica juncea, vinegar, hot oil, and soy sauce. It has different flavors such as sour, sweet, fragrant, spicy and salty. Commonly is for breakfast but also a popular street snack in Sichuan, Yunnan, and Hubei.
Kung Pao beef tendon		宮保牛筋	宫保牛筋	gōngbǎo niú jīn	
Kung Pao chicken		宮保雞丁	宫保鸡丁	gōngbǎo jīdīng	Beef or lamb can be substituted for the chicken.
Mao xue wang		毛血旺	毛血旺	máo xuě wàng	Traditional dish from Chongqing made from pig's blood, tripe, duck's blood, ham and chicken gizzard. Beansprouts, chili, Sichuan peppercorn, sesame and other spices are often added as seasoning.
Mapo tofu		麻婆豆腐	麻婆豆腐	mápó dòufǔ	Literally "pockmarked old woman's tofu". Spicy sauce similar to yuxiang ("in the style of fish") sauce.
Sliced beef/beef tripe/ox tongue in chili sauce		夫妻肺片	夫妻肺片	fūqī fèipiàn	Literally "husband and wife lung pieces"
Shredded chicken cold noodles		雞絲涼麵	鸡丝凉面	jī sī liáng miàn	
Shredded pork in yuxiang sauce		魚香肉絲	鱼香肉丝	yúxiāng ròusī	Literally "sliced pork with fish aroma"
Sichuan hotpot		四川火鍋	四川火锅	Sìchuān huǒguō	Sichuan hotpot, the most famous Chinese hotpot, is one of the representative dishes in Sichuan cuisine and famous for its numb and spicy taste. The tradition may owe itself to the area's high humidity, whereby the locals eat spicy food to remove the moisture from their bodies.
Stir-fried green beans		乾煸四季豆	干煸四季豆	gān biān sìjì dòu	Also known as "Dry Fried Green Beans", "Dry Fried String Beans", "Sichuan Style Green Beans", "Szechuan Dry Fried Green Beans", or "Spicy Green Beans"
Tea-smoked duck		樟茶鴨	樟茶鸭	zhāngchá yā	
Three-pepper chicken		三椒煸雞	三椒煸鸡	sān jiāo biān jī	
Twice-cooked pork		回鍋肉	回锅肉	huíguōròu	Literally "meat returning to the wok". Fresh pork is first boiled, then fried.
Water-cooked meat		水煮肉	水煮肉	shuǐzhǔ ròu	
Steamed sweet pork with sticky rice.		甜燒白	甜烧白	tián shāo bái	Fill mashed red beans into sliced pork belly and lay the pork on steamed sweet sticky rice.
Fish-fragrant eggplant		魚香茄子	鱼香茄子	yúxiāng qiézi	Steamed eggplant in a sauce commonly used in cooking fish
Shredded chicken salad	Sichuan shredded chicken salad	涼拌雞絲	凉拌鸡丝	liáng bàn jī sī	Shredded chicken mixed with spicy garlic sauce.
Bo-bo chicken		缽缽雞	钵钵鸡	bǒbǒ jī	Chilled hotpot filled with vegetables and chicken on wooden sticks, different from Bon bon chicken.
Mala duck tongue		麻辣鴨舌	麻辣鸭舌	málà yā shé	Duck tongues stir-fried with Sichuan pepper and chili
Stir-fried chicken kidney		爆炒腰花	爆炒腰花	bàochǎo yāo huā	Stir-fried chicken kidney with pickled pepper sauce
Sichuan signature barbecue		川味燒烤	川味烧烤	chuān wèi shāo kǎo	Barbecue with Sichuan pepper as seasoning
Leshan douhua		樂山豆腐腦	乐山豆腐脑	lèshān dòu fǔ nǎo	Tender tofu with specially made sauce, originated from Leshan, Sichuan.
Leng chi tu		冷吃兔	冷吃兔	lěng chī tù	Marinated spicy rabbit meat.
Leng dan bei		冷淡杯	冷淡杯	lěng dàn bēi	Leng dan bei is a street food from Chengdu that has emerged in recent years. It consists of cold dishes that are served quickly.
Stir-fried potato		土豆絲	土豆丝	tǔdòu sī	Literally "potato thread". Thinly sliced or shredded potato stir-fried with spices.

== See also ==
- Hunan cuisine
- Chen Kenmin
- Chen Kenichi
- List of Chinese dishes

== Sources ==
- Dunlop, Fuchsia (2003), Land of Plenty: A Treasury of Authentic Sichuan Cooking, New York: Norton, ISBN 0393051773. Internet Archive ONLINE
- Chiang, Jung-Feng (1976), Mrs. Chiang's Szechwan Cookbook : Szechwan Home Cooking, Ellen Schrecker and John E. Schrecker, New York: Harper & Row, ISBN 006015828X. Internet Archive ONLINE.
