= Fish with pickled mustard greens =

Chinese seafood dish

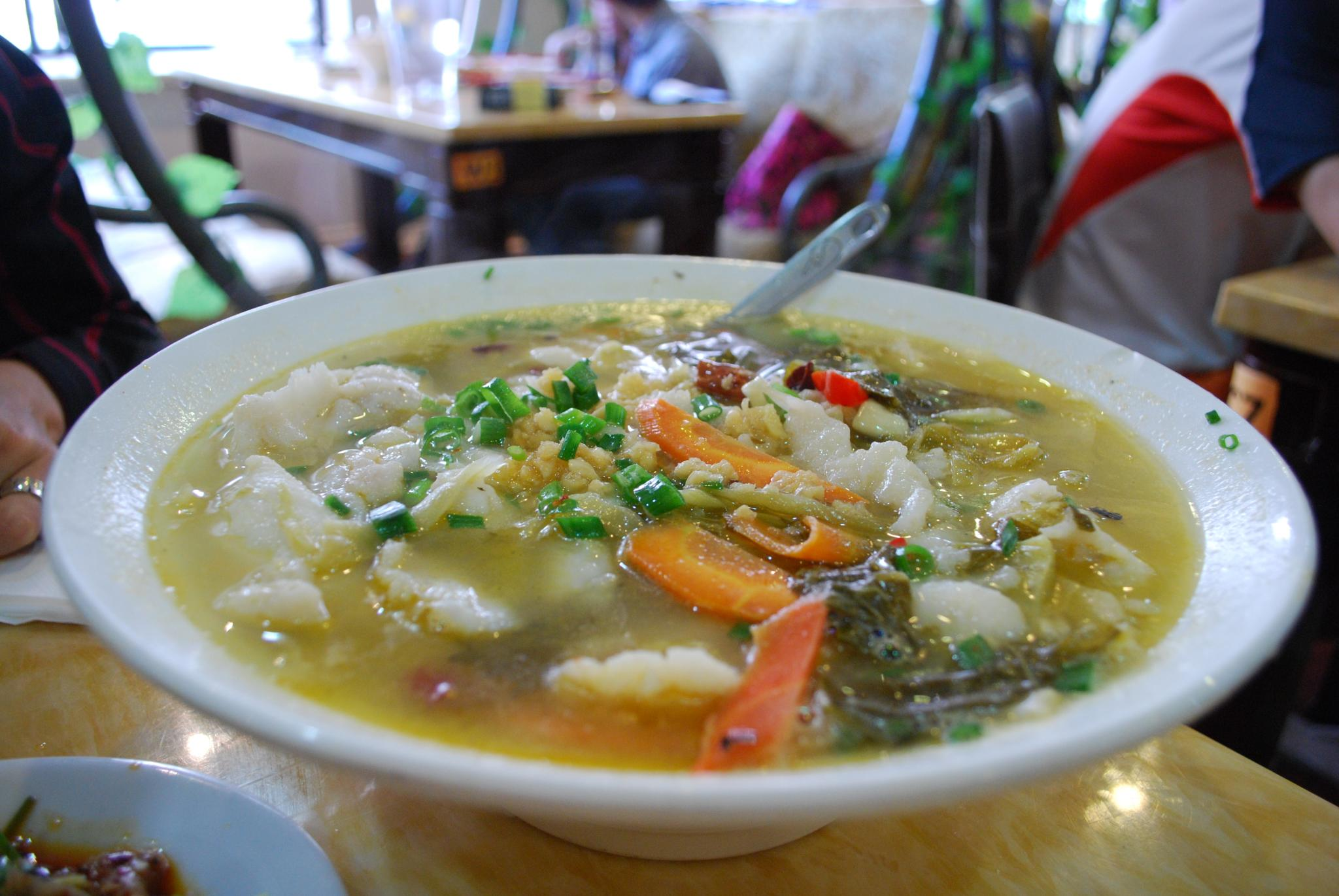
Preserved Mustard Green with Fish

Suan Cai Yu (simplified Chinese: 酸菜鱼; traditional Chinese: 酸菜魚; pinyin: suāncài yú), also known as sauerkraut fish or sichuan fish with pickled mustard greens, is a dish originating from Chongqing in Sichuan Province. Popularized in the 1990s, Suan Cai Yu has become one of Sichuan's most renowned dishes, distinguished by its sour and spicy flavors.

== Origins ==
There are several theories regarding the origin of SuanCai Yu:

First, SuanCai Yu is said to have originated on a fishing boat in Jiangjin, Chongqing. A fisherman returned from his daily work at sea and accidentally dropped his catch into a large pot of pickled broth his wife was cooking. This is how "Suan Cai Yu" was discovered and created thereafter. By the early 1990s, sauerkraut fish gained popularity in restaurants of all sizes, becoming one of the pioneers of Chongqing cuisine.

Second, another version suggests that the dish was first created at a Zhou Yu food store in Jiangjin County, Jinfu Township, Chongqing.

Third, SuanCai Yu may have originated from a fish restaurant in Bishan County, Chongqing Municipality. This restaurant, located near a highway tunnel and surrounded by bodies of water with fresh fish, introduced many fish-based dishes, including SuanCai Yu.

== Recognition ==
On September 10, 2018, SuanCai Yu was recognized as one of Chongqing's top ten classic dishes. It was featured at the 2018 First Event to Introduce "Chinese Cuisine" to the World, a major conference showcasing regional cuisines and famous banquets, held in Zhengzhou, Henan.
