= Yuxiang =

Chinese seasoning mixture

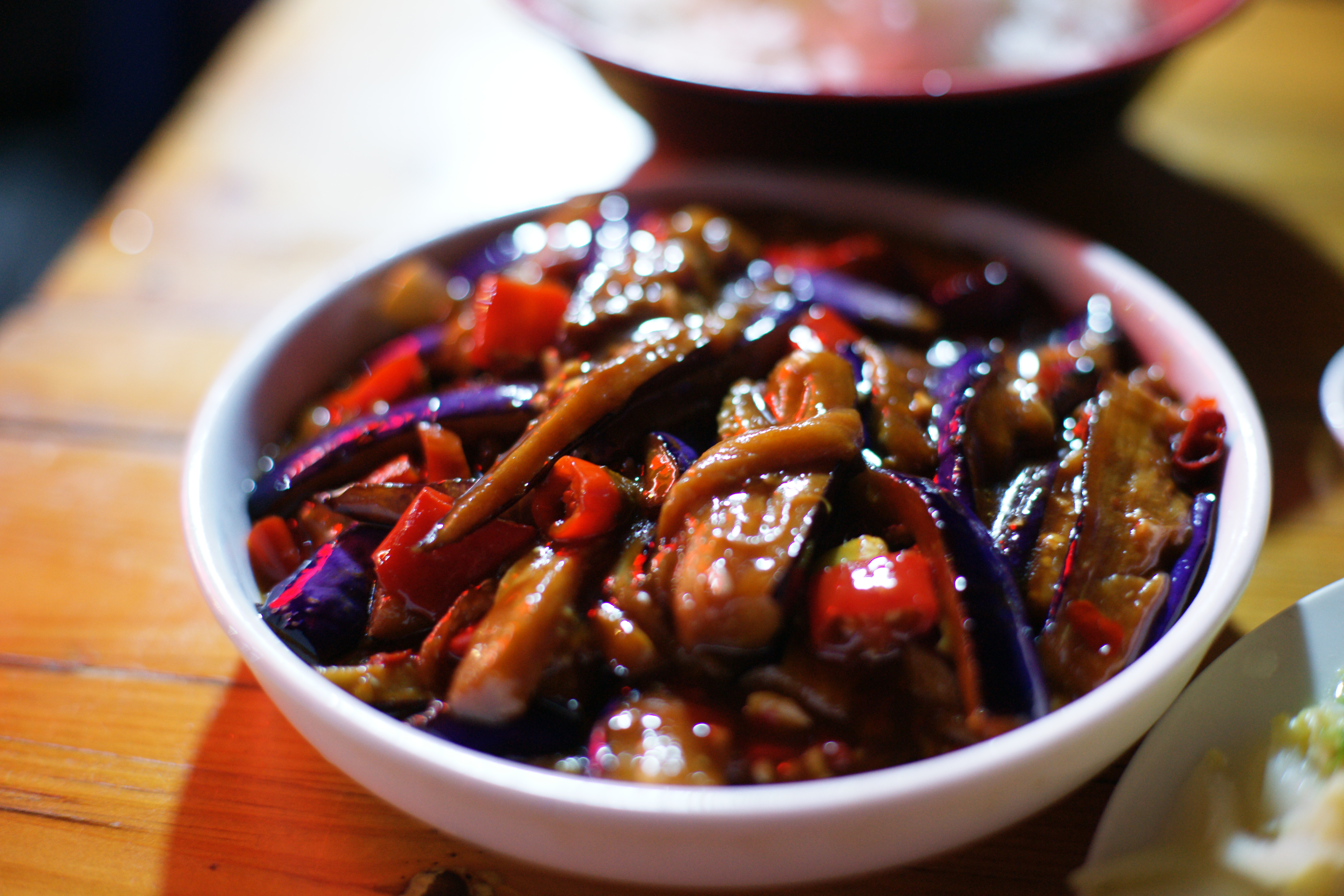
Yuxiang eggplants, a typical Sichuan dish

Yuxiang (simplified Chinese: 鱼香; traditional Chinese: 魚香; pinyin: yúxiāng; lit. 'fish fragrance') is a seasoning mixture in Chinese cuisine, and also refers to the resulting sauce in which meat or vegetables are cooked. It is said to have originated in Sichuan cuisine, and has since spread to other regional Chinese cuisines.

Despite the term literally meaning "fish fragrance" in Chinese, yuxiang contains no seafood and is typically not added to seafood.

On top of the basic mixture, cooking yuxiang almost always includes the use of sugar, vinegar, doubanjiang, soy sauce, and pickled chili peppers.

== Preparation ==
Proper preparation of the yuxiang seasoning includes finely minced pao la jiao (pickled chili), white scallion, ginger, and garlic. They are mixed in more-or-less equal portions, though some prefer to include more scallions than ginger and garlic. The mixture is then fried in oil until fragrant. Water, starch, sugar, and vinegar are then added to create a basic sauce.

== Dishes ==
The sauce is used most often for dishes containing beef, pork, or chicken. It is sometimes used for vegetarian recipes. Barbara Tropp suggests in The Modern Art of Chinese Cooking that the characters can also be interpreted as meaning "Sichuan-Hunan" (渝湘) flavor. Dishes that use yuxiang as the main seasoning have the term affixed to their name. For instance:

- Yúxiāngròusī (魚香肉絲): Pork strips stir-fried with yuxiang
- Yúxiāngqiézi (魚香茄子): Braised eggplants with yuxiang
- Yúxiāngniúnǎn (魚香牛腩): Beef brisket stewed with yuxiang
