= Chinese pickles =

Vegetables or fruits that have been fermented by pickling with salt and brine

Chinese pickles or Chinese preserved vegetables consist of vegetables or fruits that have been fermented by pickling with salt and brine (simplified Chinese: 咸菜; traditional Chinese: 鹹菜; pinyin: Xiáncài), or marinated in mixtures based on soy sauce or savory bean pastes (酱菜; 醬菜; jiàngcài). The former is usually done using high-fiber vegetables and fruits, such as Chinese cabbage, carrot, apple and pineapple, while the latter marinated group is made using a wide variety of vegetables, ranging from mustards and cucumbers to winter melon and radishes. As of now, there are more than 130 kinds of pickles.

== History ==
Vegetables have been a food resource for human survival since ancient times and in order to supply people with basic food needs, it was necessary to store some vegetables during the peak harvest season for consumption in the off-season. Therefore, the ancient Chinese used salt to preserve fresh vegetables by salting and pickling them in earthen jars.

Claims to the history of pickled vegetables date back to the Shang dynasty. The Shijing (~11th century BCE) mentions "葅", understood to be a word for pickles. The pickled vegetables and fruit we refer to today date in practice back to the sixth century B.C.E. In the following Zhou dynasty, Northern Wei dynasty, Tang dynasty, Song dynasty, Yuan dynasty and Ming dynasty, there were historical records and books about pao cai.

== Flavor ==
Chinese pickles all need to balance the flavors of sweet, sour, pungent, salt, bitter and savory. There are also spicy pickles with floral notes, such as the Sichuan pepper. However, most Chinese pickles still aim for a balance between the tastes of vinegar, salt, garlic, ginger, soy sauce, hot chili, sugar, and the vegetable or fruit itself. Most pickles need to wait for a few months for the vegetables and fruit to ferment, but there are also "quick pickles" which can be eaten a few hours or a few days after preparation. Cucumber pickles, for example, may be eaten after they have been pickled in a jar for three hours.

== Consumption ==
Chinese pickles can be eaten by themselves as an appetizer, or used as an ingredient for cooking a larger dish. Before a meal, they are served with wine, beer, sodas, or tea to stimulate people's appetites. People eat small dishes of Chinese pickles and some snacks to drink and chat. Chinese pickles can also be used to flavor a serving of plain rice as an inexpensive meal. Chinese pickles are used as a flavor base in cooking. Pickled ginger and pickled peppers are frequently used ingredients in Sichuan cuisine. They can also be used to flavor vegetables, meat, poultry, and seafood; for example, Chinese duck soup is prepared with pickled radish.

== Fermented ==
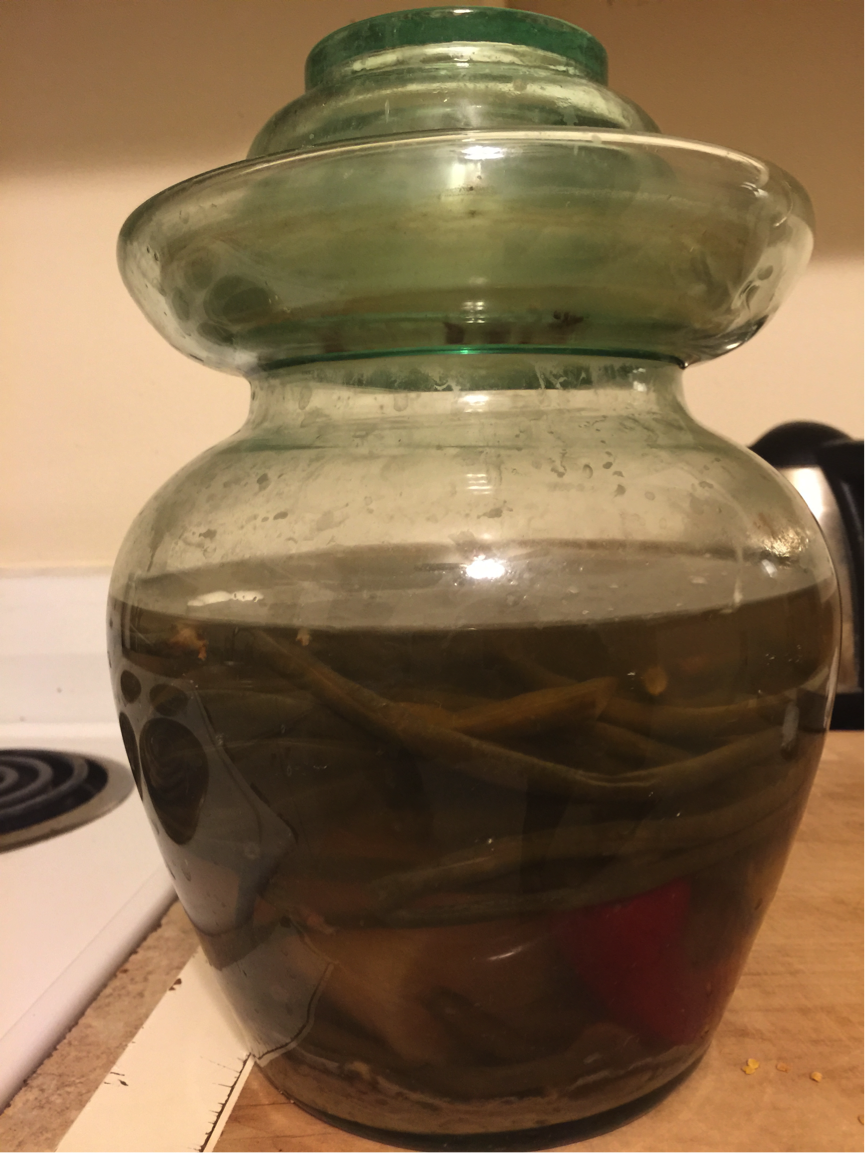
Glass Chinese pickle jar commonly used to pickle vegetables

Vegetables and plums are salted and allowed to ferment with the help of lactic acid bacteria. Depending on the desired product, the vegetable may also be fermented with Chinese wine and spices. Some types of these preserved vegetables are produced through being repeatedly dried after the fermentation.

- Gongcai (simplified Chinese: 贡菜; traditional Chinese: 貢菜; pinyin: gòngcài)
- Meigan cai (梅菜; méi cài)
- Suan cai (酸菜; suāncài)
- Tianjin preserved vegetable (冬菜; dōngcài)
- Prunus mume (酸梅; suān méi)
- Zhacai (榨菜; zhàcài)
- Ya cai (芽菜; yácài)
- Changzhou dried turnip (常州萝卜干; Chángzhōu luóbo gān
- Pao cai (泡菜; pàocài)

== Marinated ==
Vegetables are usually marinated in a soy sauce mixture with sugar, vinegar, salt, and additional spices. The vegetables are lightly boiled in the soy mixture before being left to cool and absorb the marinade:

- Cucumbers (酱瓜; 醬瓜; jiàng guā)
- Radishes (腌萝卜; 醃蘿蔔; yān luóbo)
- Bitter melon (腌苦瓜; 醃苦瓜; yān kǔguā)
- Garlic (腊八蒜; 臘八蒜; làbā suàn)

== Possible health hazards of pickled vegetables ==
The World Health Organization has listed pickled vegetables as a possible carcinogen, and the British Journal of Cancer released an online 2009 meta-analysis of research on pickles as increasing the risks of esophageal cancer. The report, citing limited data in a statistical meta analysis, indicates a potential two-fold increased risk of oesophageal cancer associated with Asian pickled vegetable consumption. Results from the research are described as having "high heterogeneity" and the study said that further well-designed prospective studies were warranted. However, their results stated "The majority of subgroup analyses showed a statistically significant association between consuming pickled vegetables and oesophageal squamous cell carcinoma".

The 2009 meta-analysis reported heavy infestation of pickled vegetables with fungi. Some common fungi can facilitate the formation of N-nitroso compounds, which are strong oesophageal carcinogens in several animal models. Roussin red methyl ester, a non-alkylating nitroso compound with tumour-promoting effect in vitro, was identified in pickles from Linxian in much higher concentrations than in samples from low-incidence areas. Fumonisin mycotoxins have been shown to cause liver and kidney tumours in rodents.

A 2017 study in Chinese Journal of Cancer has linked salted vegetables (common among Chinese cuisine) to a fourfold increase in nasopharynx cancer, where fermentation was a critical step in creating nitrosamines, which some are confirmed carcinogens, as well as activation of Epstein–Barr virus by fermentation products.

== See also ==
- South Asian pickles – Pickled varieties of vegetable and fruit
- List of fermented foods
- Pickling – Procedure of preserving food in brine or vinegar
