= Mapo tofu =

Sichuan cuisine dish

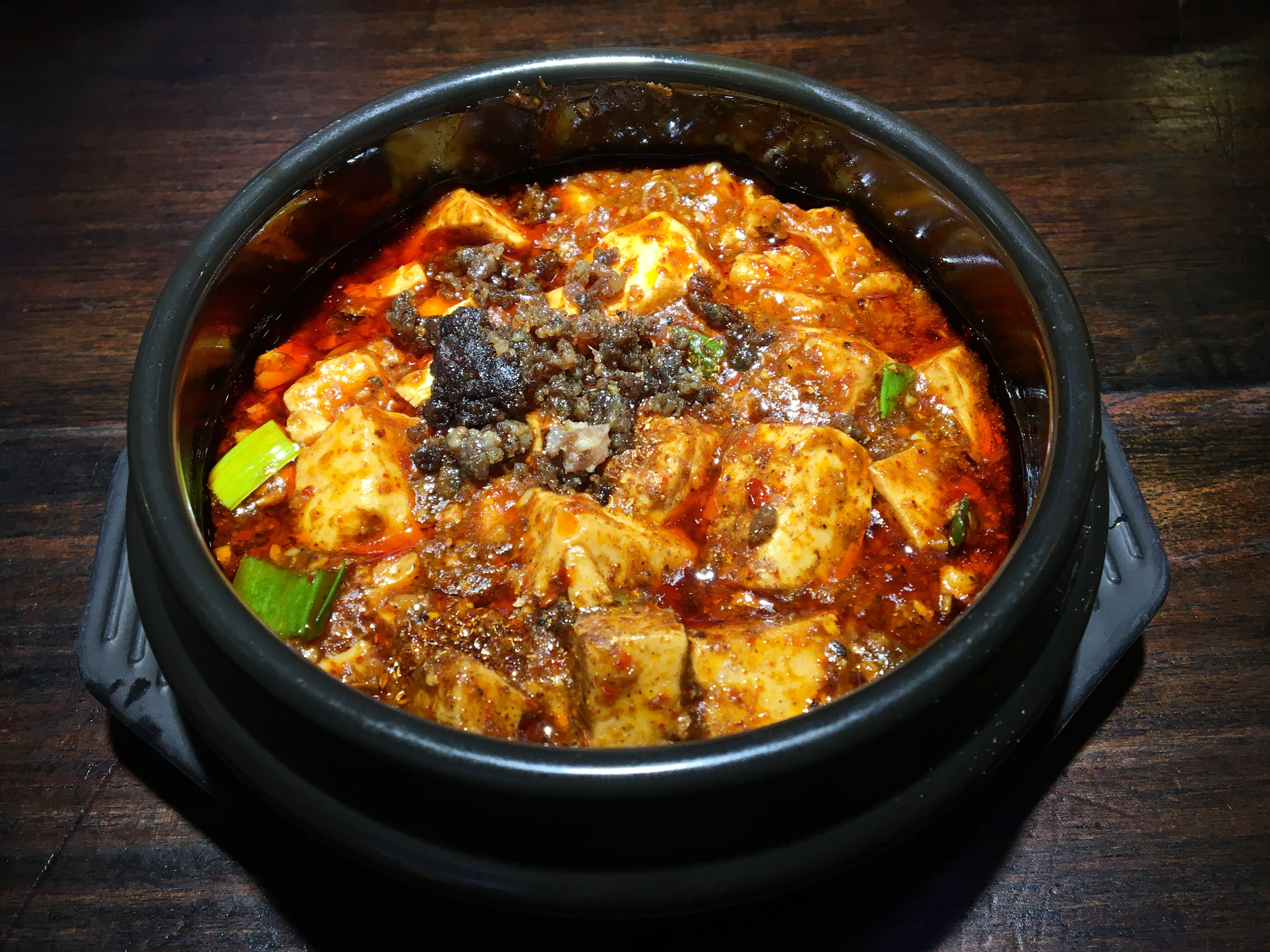
- A bowl of mapo tofu
- Place of origin: China
- Region or state: Sichuan
- Main ingredients: Tofu, douban (fermented broadbean and chili paste), and douchi (fermented black beans), along with minced meat

Chinese name
- Chinese: 麻婆豆腐
- Hanyu Pinyin: mápó dòufu
- Literal meaning: "pockmarked old woman beancurd"
Transcriptions
Standard Mandarin
- Hanyu Pinyin: mápó dòufu
- Bopomofo: ㄇㄚˊ ㄆㄛˊ ㄉㄡˋ ˙ㄈㄨ
- Gwoyeu Romatzyh: mapor dow.fuu
- Wade–Giles: ma^{2}-pʻo^{2} tou^{4}-fu
- Tongyong Pinyin: mápó dòufů
- Yale Romanization: mápwó dòufu
- IPA: [mǎ.pʰwǒ tôʊ.fu]
Yue: Cantonese
- Yale Romanization: màhpòh dauhfuh
- Jyutping: maa4po4 dau6fu6
- IPA: [ma˩.pʰɔ˩ tɐw˨.fu˨]
Southern Min
- Hokkien POJ: bâ-pô-tāu-hū

Mapo tofu (Chinese: 麻婆豆腐; pinyin: mápó dòufu) is a popular Chinese dish from Sichuan province. It consists of tofu set in a spicy sauce, typically a thin, oily, and bright red suspension, based on douban (fermented broad bean and chili paste), and douchi (fermented black beans), along with minced meat, traditionally beef. Variations exist with other ingredients such as water chestnuts, onions, other vegetables, or wood ear fungus. It is likely to have originated at a Chengdu restaurant in the 1860s–1870s.

== Etymology and history ==
"Ma" stands for mázi, 麻子, which means pockmarks. "Po" is the first syllable of pópo, 婆婆, which means an old woman or grandma. Hence, mápó is an old woman whose face is pockmarked. It is thus sometimes translated as "pockmarked grandma's beancurd".

Historical records tie the history of mapo tofu to Chen Mapo restaurant in Chengdu. It was opened in 1862 or 1874 as a Fanpu eatery named Chenxingsheng by a couple named Chen, near a popular Wanfu bridge. According to Li Jieren, the initial version created by Mrs. Chen, nicknamed "Chen Mapo," was a simple dish, made with chili, pork, tofu, and Sichuan pepper. In the 1920s, Chen Mapo hired a chef named Xue Xiangshun, who transformed the eatery into a restaurant and perfected the mapo tofu recipe by cooking with beef instead of pork and adding douchi.

The first written and published recipe for mapo tofu was included in “中国名菜谱”, a 1950s document by the Food, Beverage, and Hospitality Bureau cataloguing recipes found throughout the country. It did not include Pixian doubanjiang or Sichuan chili bean paste, relying only on douchi. A documentary named Chugoku No Shoku Bunka from the 1980s shows a Chen Mapo restaurant version of mapo tofu that doesn't use doubanjiang or chili bean paste either.

According to Mrs. Chiang's Szechwan Cookbook: "Eugene Wu, the Librarian of the Harvard Yenching Library, grew up in Chengdu and claims that as a schoolboy he used to eat Pock-Marked Ma's Bean Curd or mapo doufu, at a restaurant run by the original Pock-Marked Ma herself. One ordered by weight, specifying how many grams of bean curd and meat, and the serving would be weighed out and cooked as the diner watched. It arrived at the table fresh, fragrant, and so spicy hot, or la, that it actually caused sweat to break out."

In Japan, the dish was introduced and popularized by the Chinese-Japanese chef Chen Kenmin. His son, Chen Kenichi, made it more popular as it was one of his trademark dishes on the television program Iron Chef.

== Characteristics ==
Authentic mapo tofu is powerfully spicy with both conventional "heat" spiciness and the characteristic málà (numbing spiciness) flavor of Sichuan cuisine. The feel of the particular dish is often described by cooks using seven specific Chinese adjectives: má 麻 (numbing), là 辣 (spicy hot), tàng 烫 (hot temperature), xiān 鲜 (fresh), nèn 嫩 (tender and soft), xiāng 香 (aromatic), and sū 酥 (flaky). The authentic form of the dish is increasingly easy to find outside China today, but it is usually adapted for non-Sichuanese tastes.

The most important and necessary ingredients in the dish that give it the distinctive flavour are chili broad bean paste (salty bean paste) from Sichuan's Pixian county (郫县豆瓣酱), fermented black beans, chili oil, chili flakes, Sichuan peppercorns, garlic, ginger, and green onions. Supplementary ingredients include water or stock, sugar (depending on the saltiness of the bean paste brand used), and starch (if it is desired to thicken the sauce).

== Variations ==
Mapo tofu can also be found in restaurants in other Chinese provinces, as well as in Japan and Korea where the flavor is adapted to local tastes. In the West, the dish is often greatly changed, with its spiciness toned down in order to widen its appeal. This happens particularly in Chinese restaurants which do not specialize in Sichuan cuisine. The dish is often made without meat to appeal to vegetarians, using shiitake, other edible mushrooms, or plant-based meat substitutes. In preparing the vegetarian version of the dish, one can add pickled vegetables (zha cai or ya cai) to create more flavor to make up for the absence of the meat, but these are optional. The pickles can also be added to the non-vegetarian dish if desired.

== Gallery ==
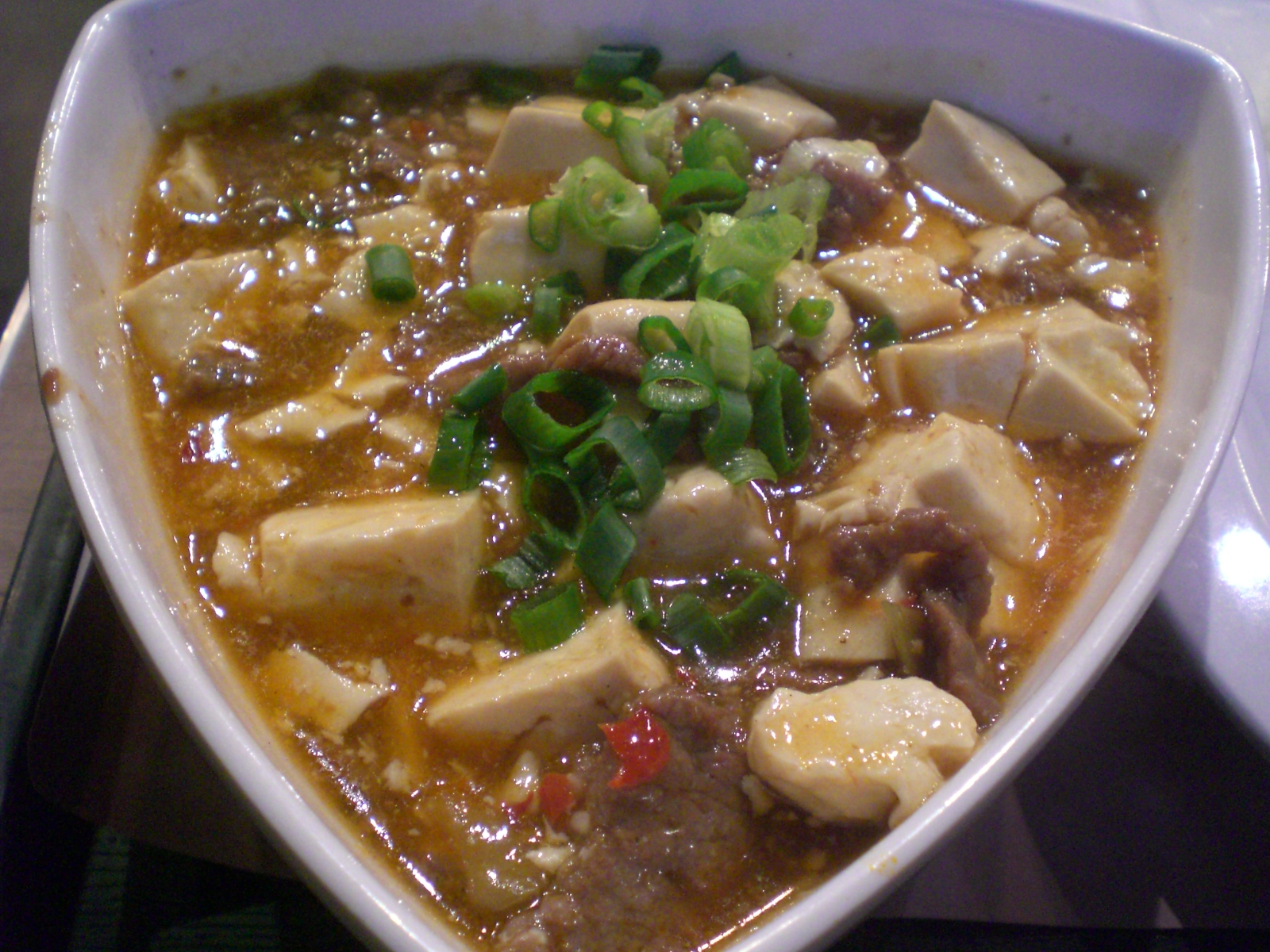
Mapo tofu in Hong Kong

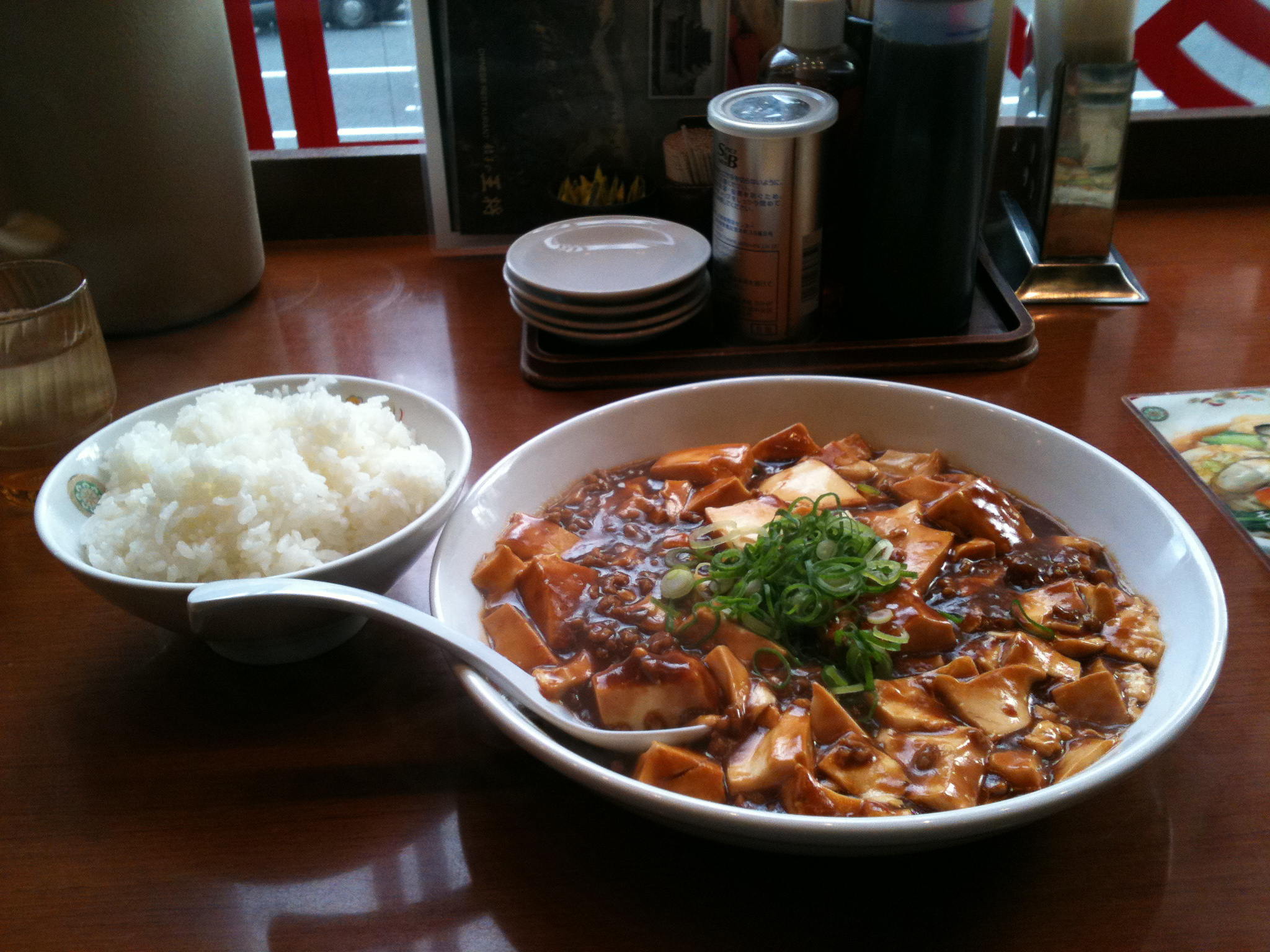
Mapo tofu at a restaurant in Kobe, Japan

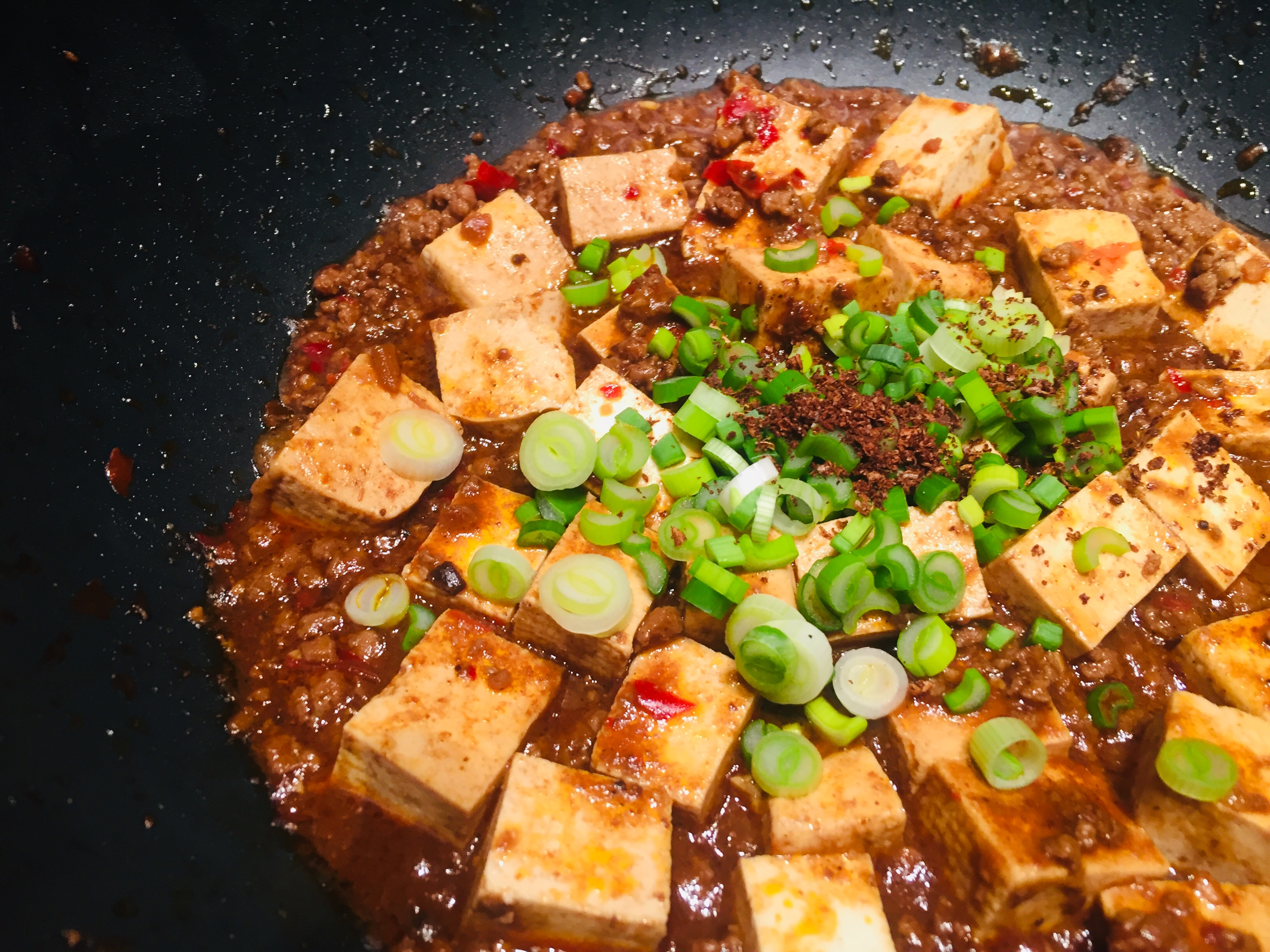
Homemade mapo tofu

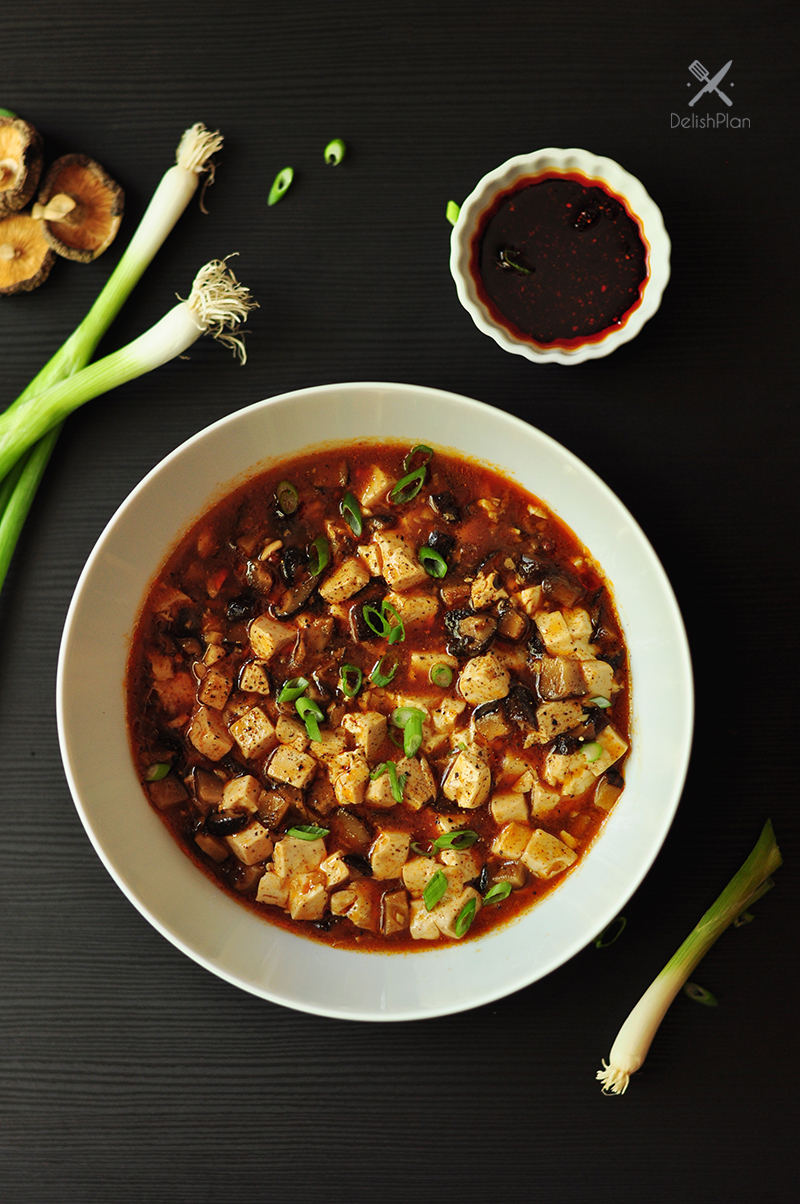
Vegan mapo tofu

== See also ==
- Chinese cuisine
- Sichuan cuisine
- Kung Pao chicken
- List of Chinese dishes
- List of tofu dishes
