= Dandan noodles =

Chinese noodle dish

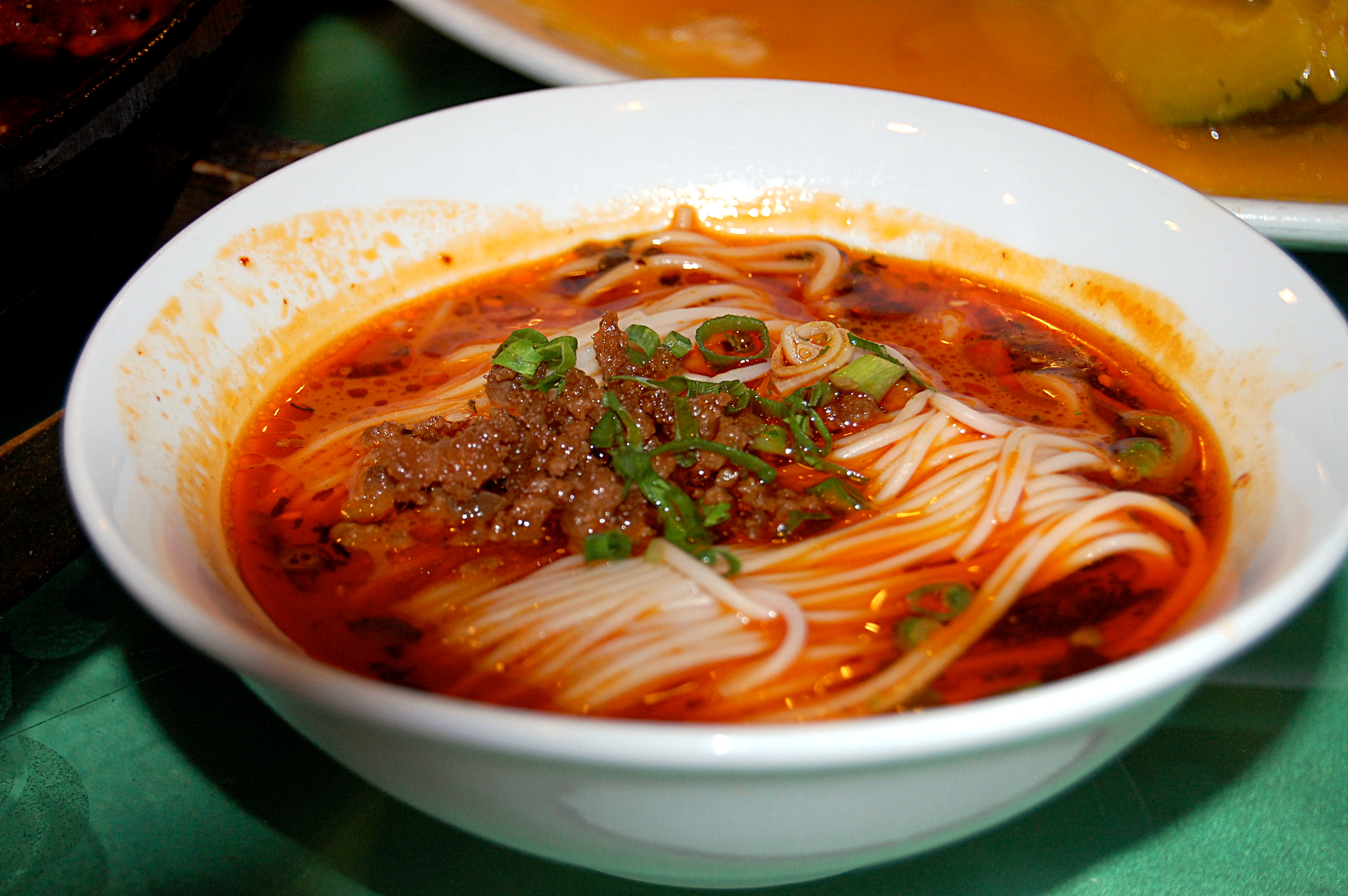
- Hong Kong–style dandan noodle soup (擔擔湯麵) from a Sichuanese restaurant in Shanghai, with red chili oil, pork, and spring onions
- Alternative names: Dandanmian, tantanmen
- Type: Noodles, noodle soup
- Course: Main
- Place of origin: China
- Region or state: Sichuan
- Serving temperature: Hot, cold
- Main ingredients: Chinese noodles, chili oil
- Variations: Jinsimian

Dandan noodles

Chinese name
- Traditional Chinese: 擔擔麵
- Simplified Chinese: 担担面
- Literal meaning: "carrying-pole noodles"
Transcriptions
Standard Mandarin
- Hanyu Pinyin: dàndànmiàn
- IPA: [tântânmjɛ̂n]
Yue: Cantonese
- Jyutping: daam1 daam 1 min6

Japanese name
- Kanji: 担々麺
- Kana: タンタンメン
Transcriptions
- Romanization: Tantanmen

Dandan noodles (traditional Chinese: 擔擔麵; simplified Chinese: 担担面; dandanmian, literally 'carrying pole noodles') is a Chinese noodle dish originating from Sichuan cuisine. The dish consists of wheat noodles served with a spicy sauce that usually contains pickled vegetables such as zha cai (lower mustard stems) or ya cai (upper mustard stems), chili oil, Sichuan pepper, and minced pork, and is topped with scallions and peanuts. The dish can be served either dry, as in the Chengdu style, or as a noodle soup, as in the Hong Kong style.

Dandanmian originated in Chengdu, the capital of Sichuan. The original dish is served with no soup in a small bowl covered in a mala meat sauce and pickled vegetables, with peanuts and scallions served on top. The soup variant is from Hong Kong, which tones down the spice, and sometimes includes sesame paste or peanut butter. The Hong Kong variant is uncommon in Sichuan itself, where the traditional style dominates, but it is widespread throughout the rest of China and in Chinese restaurants overseas.

== Origin and name ==
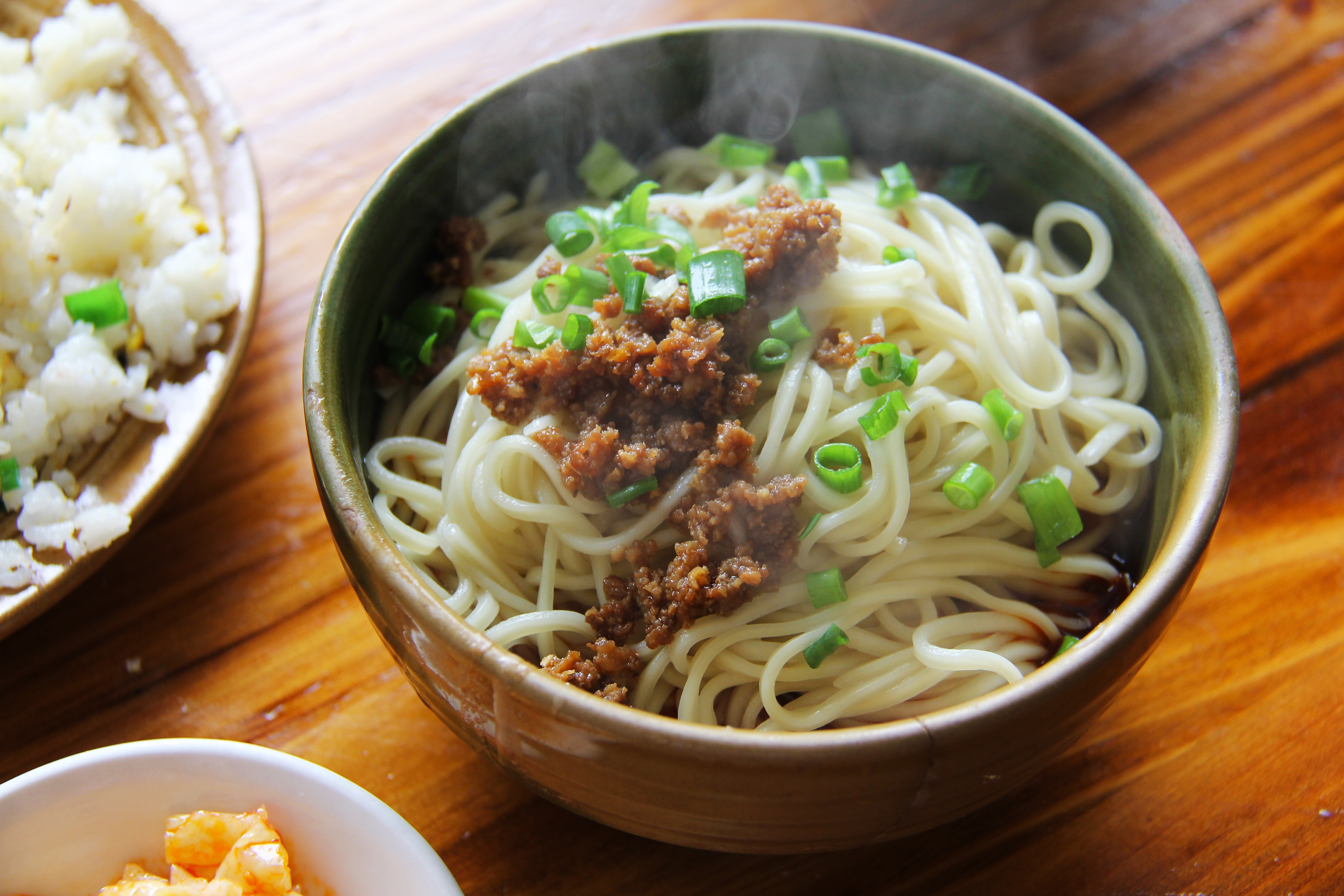
Chengdu-style dandan noodles

Dandan refers to a type of carrying pole that was used by walking street vendors who sold the dish to passers-by. The pole was carried over the shoulder, with two baskets containing noodles and sauce attached at either end. As the noodles were affordable due to their low cost, the local people gradually came to call them dandan noodles, referencing the street vendors. The name translates directly as 'noodles carried on a pole', but may be better translated as 'peddler's noodles'.

A variety of English spellings are used. The first word may be either dandan, dundun or tantan. The last word mian (noodle) may also be spelled mein in Cantonese pronunciation.

== Related dishes ==
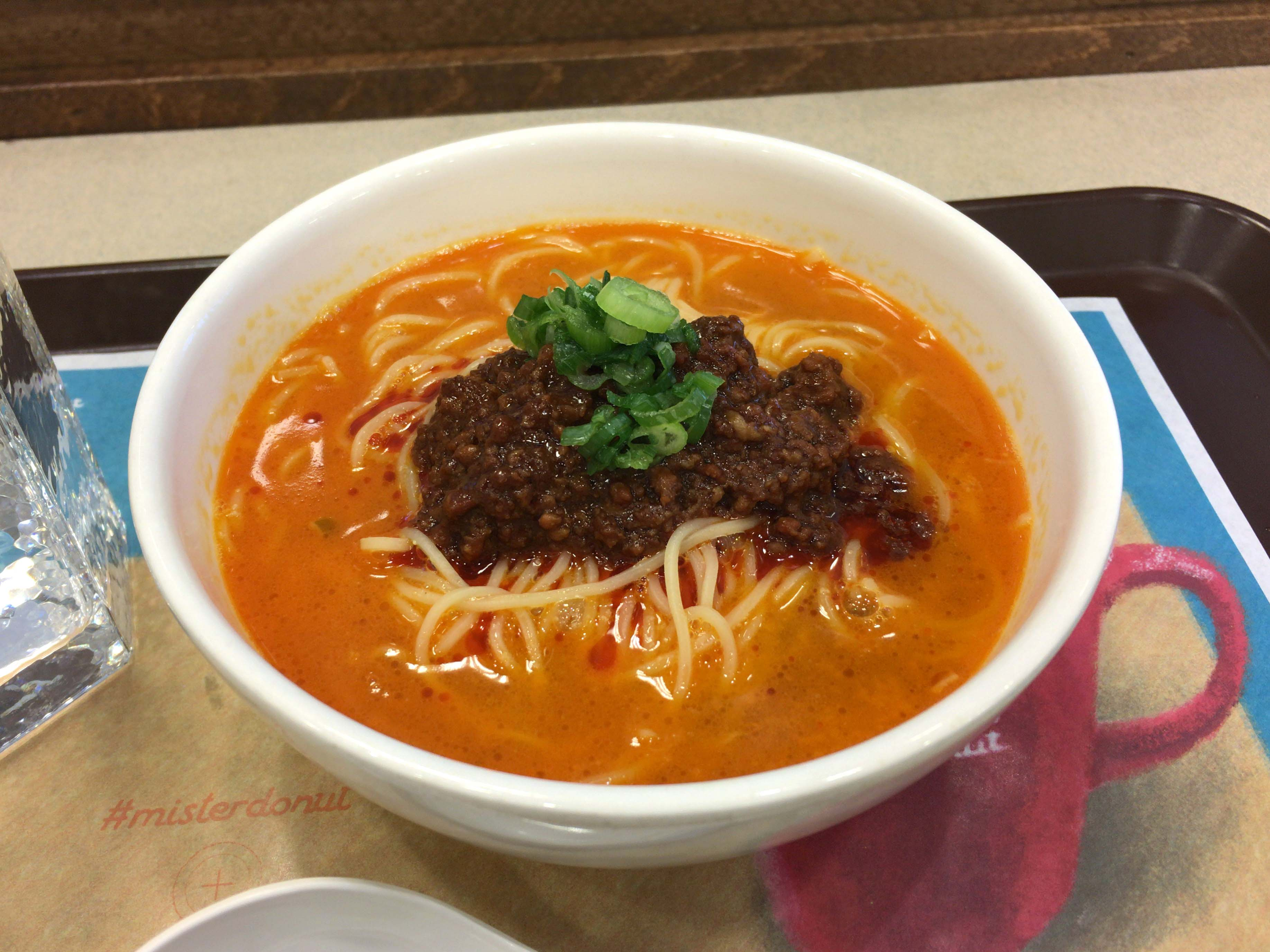
Japanese tantanmen from a Mister Donut store, which is based on Hong Kong-style dandanmian

The same sauce is frequently served over bang bang chicken, and on steamed, meat-filled dumplings in another Sichuan dish called suanla chaoshou.

The dish was introduced to Japan by Sichuanese chef Chen Kenmin. It is known as tantan-men in Japanese, formally written 担担麺, as in Chinese, but often written with an iteration mark as 担々麺, or with 坦 instead of 担. It is sometimes considered a form of ramen.

=== Jinsimian ===
Jinsimian (金丝面) or "gold thread noodle" is a variation of the dandan noodles, which was invented by chef Li Hong-kai (李红凯) in 1989. Using a special kneading technique, Li was able to make a dough consistency that does not become mushy when cooking even if cut really thin. The noodles are cut so thin they can be threaded through a needle. Li was registered in Guinness World Records for the most noodles (45) threaded through a needle, which was beaten by Li Enhai in 2010 by adding two more threads. The latter also holds the record of the thinnest noodle at 0,18 mm. As of 2024, there are other chefs as well, who cook the dandan dish using jinsimian.

== Gallery ==
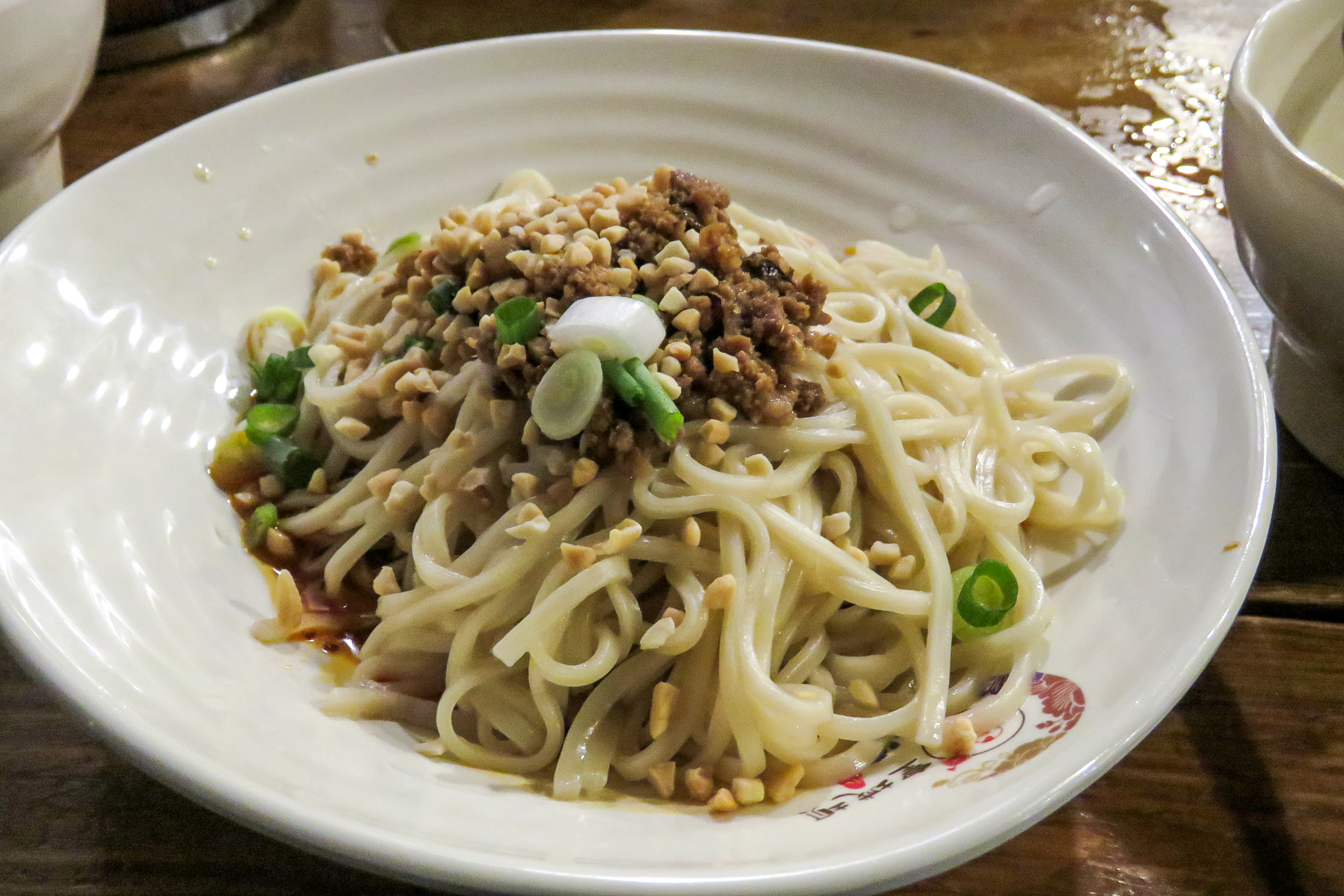
Dandanmian from Chengdu

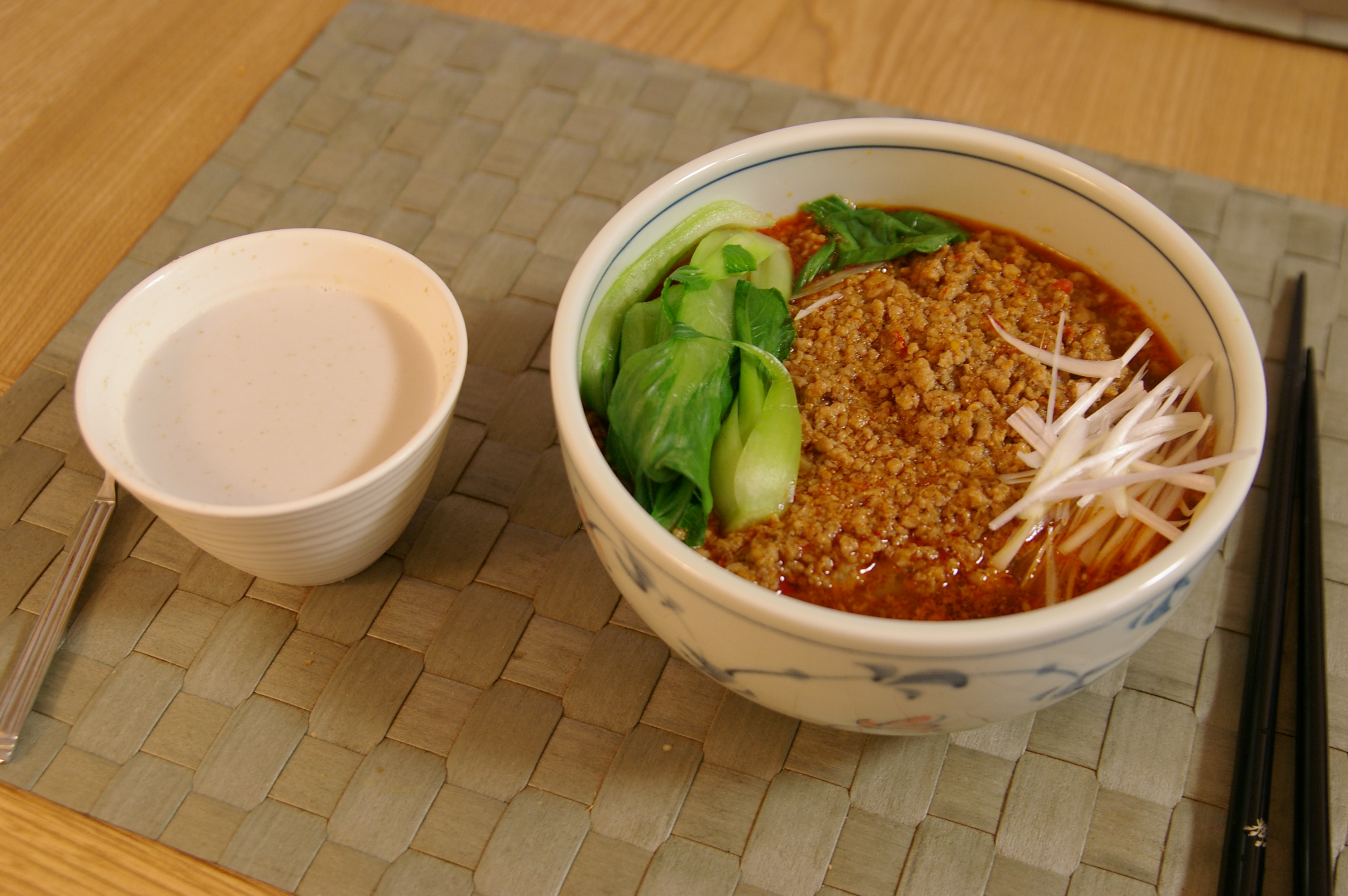
Spicy dandanmian served with coconut milk pudding

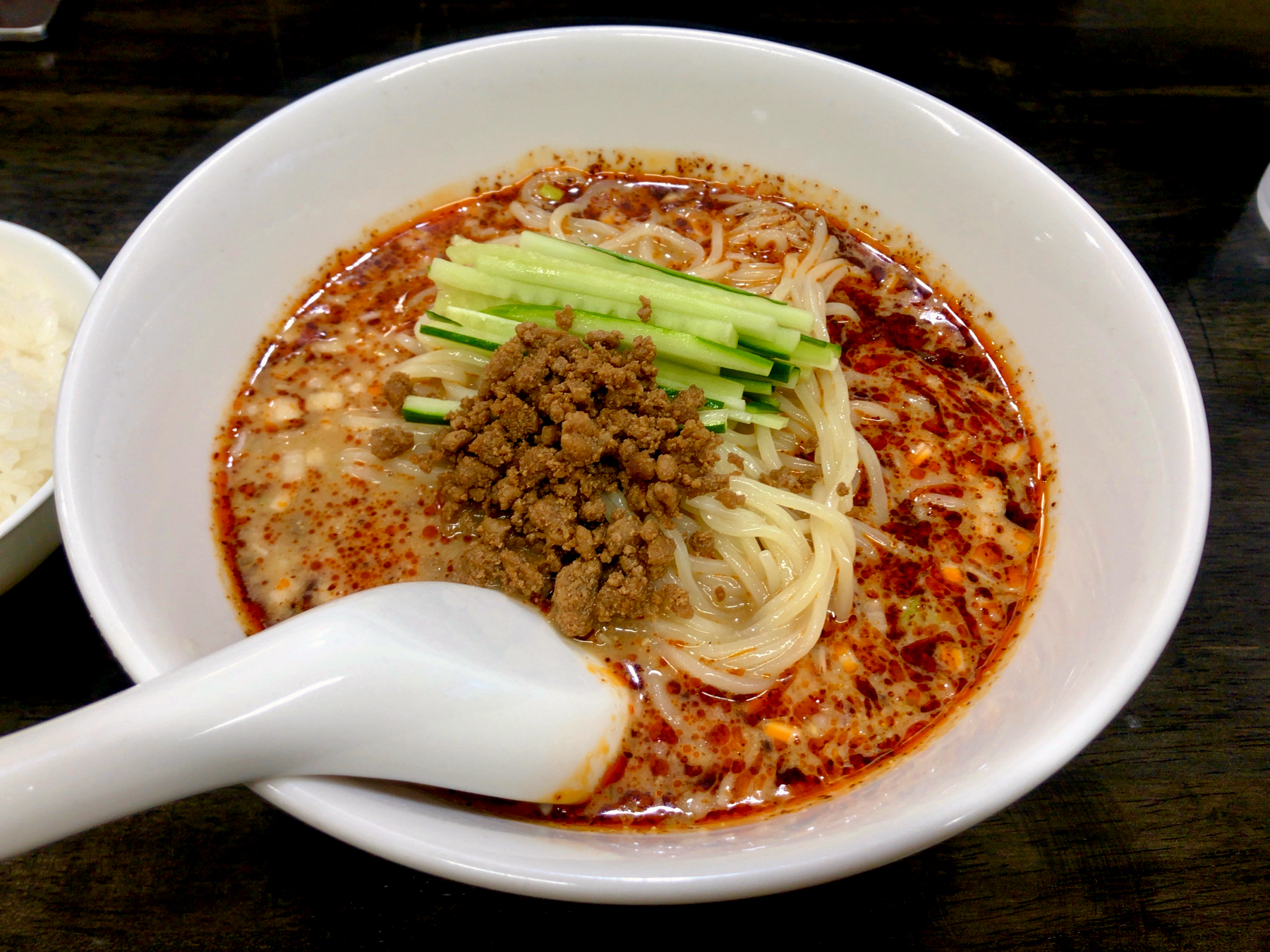
Japanese tantanmen

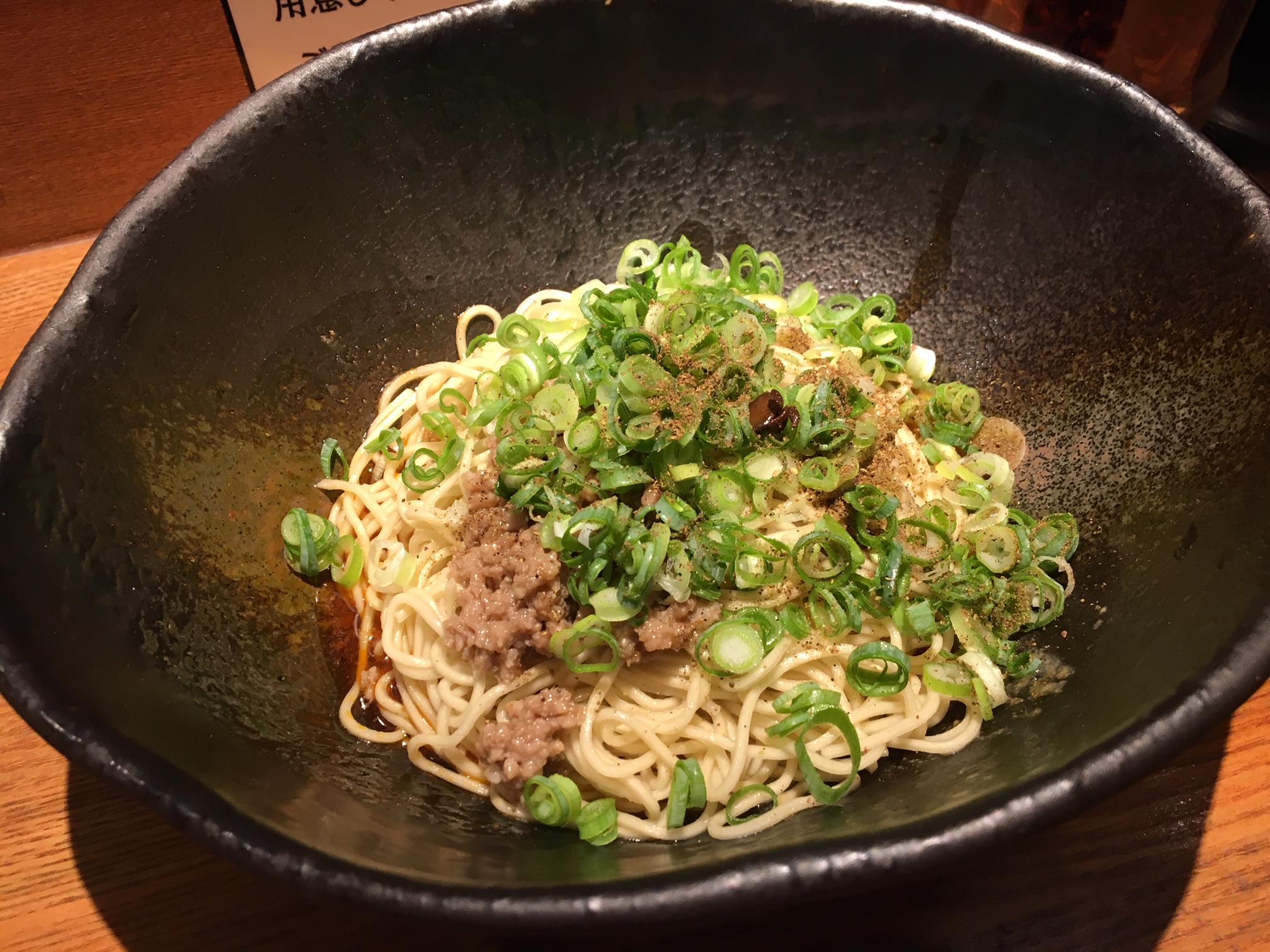
Japanese soupless tantanmen

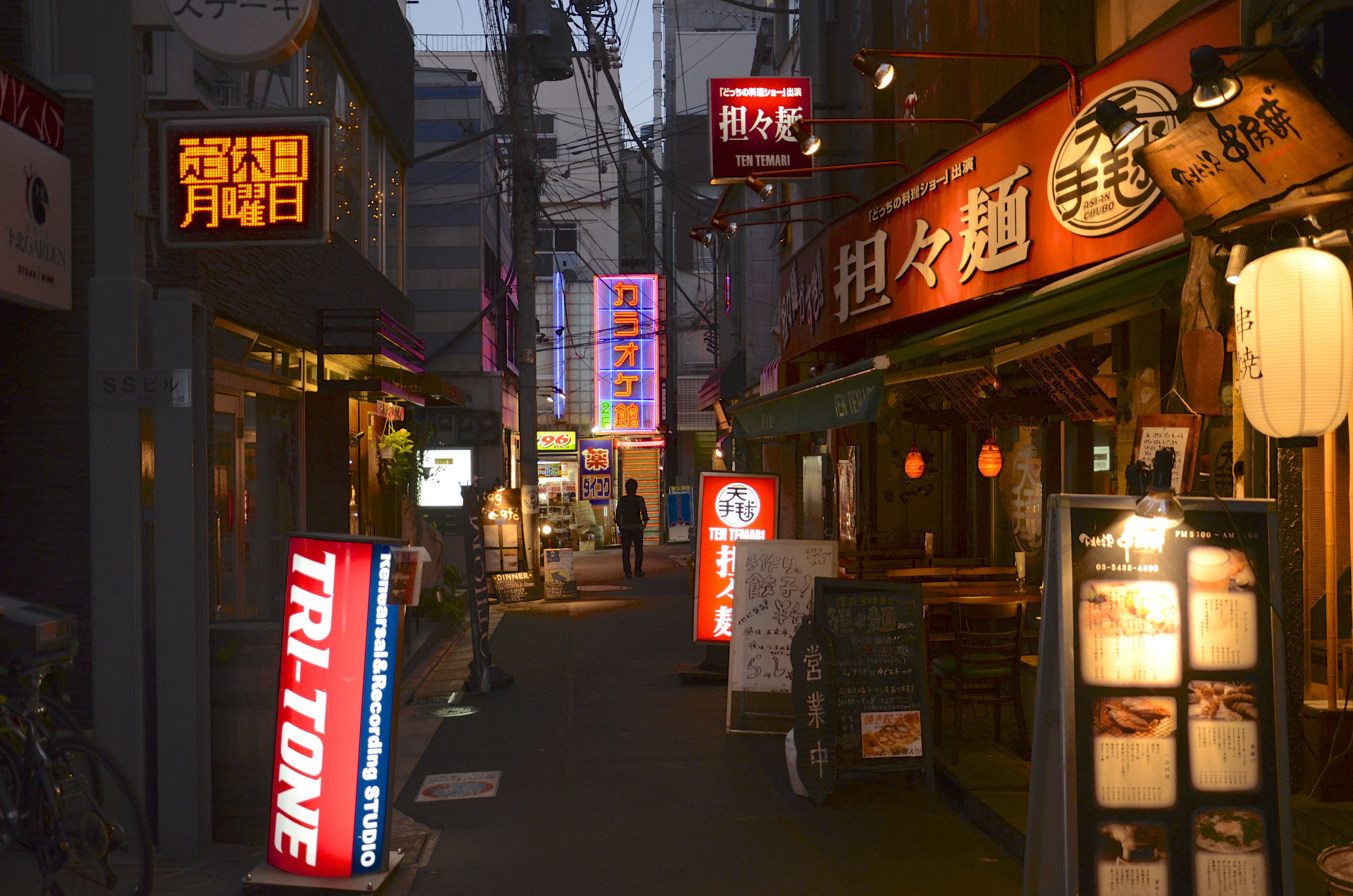
Store selling tantanmen in Tokyo

== See also ==
- Chinese noodles
- List of Chinese dishes
- Ta-a noodles
