= Ya cai =

Chinese pickled vegetable

Ya cai (Chinese: 芽菜; pinyin: yácài) is a pickled vegetable originating from Sichuan province, China. It is made from the upper stems of a variety of mustard green. Ya cai is more pungent than the similar zha cai.

== See also ==
- Tianjin preserved vegetable
- Suan cai
- Pao cai
- Meigan cai
