= Changzhou dried turnip =

Local food of Jiangsu province, China

Changzhou dried turnip (Chinese: 常州萝卜干; pinyin: Chángzhōu luóbogān) is a local food of Changzhou, southern Jiangsu province, east-central China. It is believed to have an almost 1,000-year history. It is called the "spicy dried turnip" because of its mix of a sweet taste and texture. It is one of the famous traditional types of pickled vegetables from China.

Changzhou dried turnip is grown in Xinzha, Zhonglou District, Changzhou, and is described as red, smooth, crumbly, and having a sweet flavor. This kind of turnip used to be called the small turnip. By following a special salted process, when one chews Changzhou dried turnip, the chewing has no residue.

== History ==
For a long time, most families living beside the canal of the Xinzha district planted and salted the turnip. After the People's Republic of China was established, the sauce-production company, Hongmei (红梅), of Changzhou became the center of its production.

In 1978, a Cheng family living on the southern bank of the canal in Beigang, adhering to the ancestors’ business, set up Changzhou Yudie specialty food product factory (常州玉蝶食品厂) to produce dried turnip. The ancestral secret recipe process has been passed on for five generations, and it is believed that the turnip made by this factory results from a more traditional process than its competitors.

== Status quo ==
The Changzhou dried turnip has already become the specialty food of Changzhou. In 2008, the “Yudie” spicy dried turnip was listed on the Changzhou non-material cultural heritage list.
