= Suan cai =

Traditional Chinese pickled vegetables

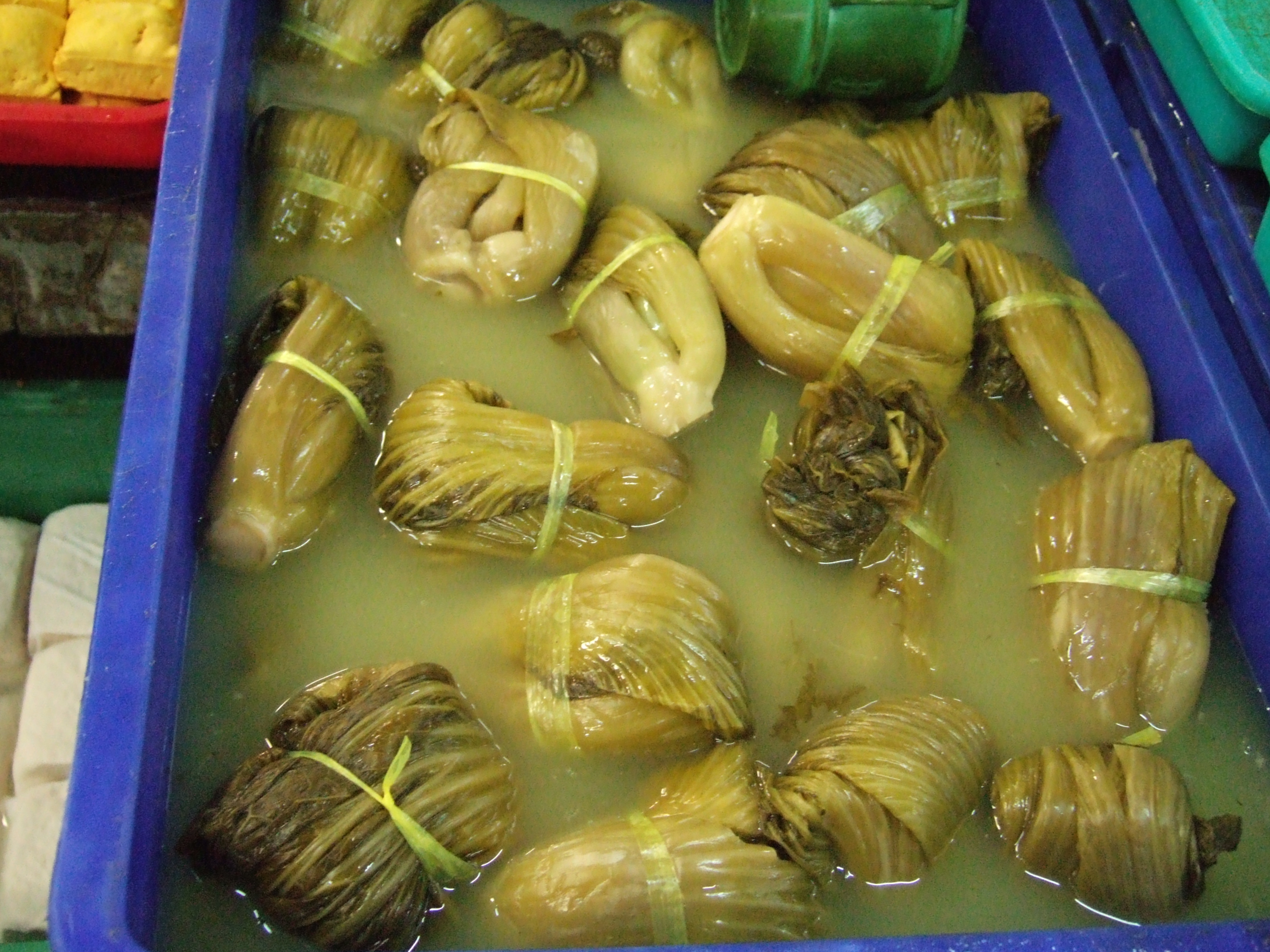
- A tub of suancai made from Chinese mustard.
- Chinese: 酸菜
- Hanyu Pinyin: suān cài
- Literal meaning: Sour vegetable
Transcriptions
Standard Mandarin
- Hanyu Pinyin: suān cài
- Wade–Giles: suan^{1}-ts'ai^{4}
other Mandarin
- Dungan: Сўан цаы
Yue: Cantonese
- Yale Romanization: syūn choi
- Jyutping: syun1 coi3

Alternative Chinese name
- Chinese: 鹹菜
- Hanyu Pinyin: xián cài
- Literal meaning: Salty vegetable
Transcriptions
Standard Mandarin
- Hanyu Pinyin: xián cài
- Wade–Giles: hsien^{2}-ts'ai^{4}
other Mandarin
- Dungan: Щыән цаы
Yue: Cantonese
- Yale Romanization: hàahm choi
Southern Min
- Hokkien POJ: kiâm-chhài

Suancai (also called suan tsai and Chinese sauerkraut; lit. 'sour vegetable') is traditional Chinese pickles made from Chinese cabbage (napa cabbage) or Chinese mustard. Suancai is a unique form of paocai, due to the ingredients used and the method of production.

== History ==
In China, the earliest record of Chinese traditional Suan cai production is in the Book of Odes (or Classic of Poetry), dating back to 11th to 7th centuries BC. During that time period, fermented vegetables were used as a sacrifice in the worship ceremony of ancestors. In the poem Xin Nan Shan (Chinese: 信南山; pinyin: xìn nán shān), there is a description of how the ancient Chinese produced suan cai by pickling gourds:

In the midst of the fields are the huts, 中田有廬、

And along the bounding divisions are gourds. 疆場有瓜。

The fruit(s) is sliced and pickled, 是剝是菹、

To be presented to our great ancestors, 獻之皇祖。

That their distant descendant may have long life, 曾孫壽考、

And receive the blessing of Heaven. 受天之祜。

—Classic of Poetry (translated by Xuepen Sun and Xiaoqian Zheng, in Shi Jing [Book of Odes])

A Northern Wei Dynasty (386-534 AD) agricultural book, Ch'i Min Yao Shu, illustrates the detailed procedure of producing 18 types of suan cai using different vegetables. Some of the vegetables are plain while others add salt in the suan cai. This indicates that suan cai were commonly accepted and widely eaten by Chinese people during that time.

== Production ==
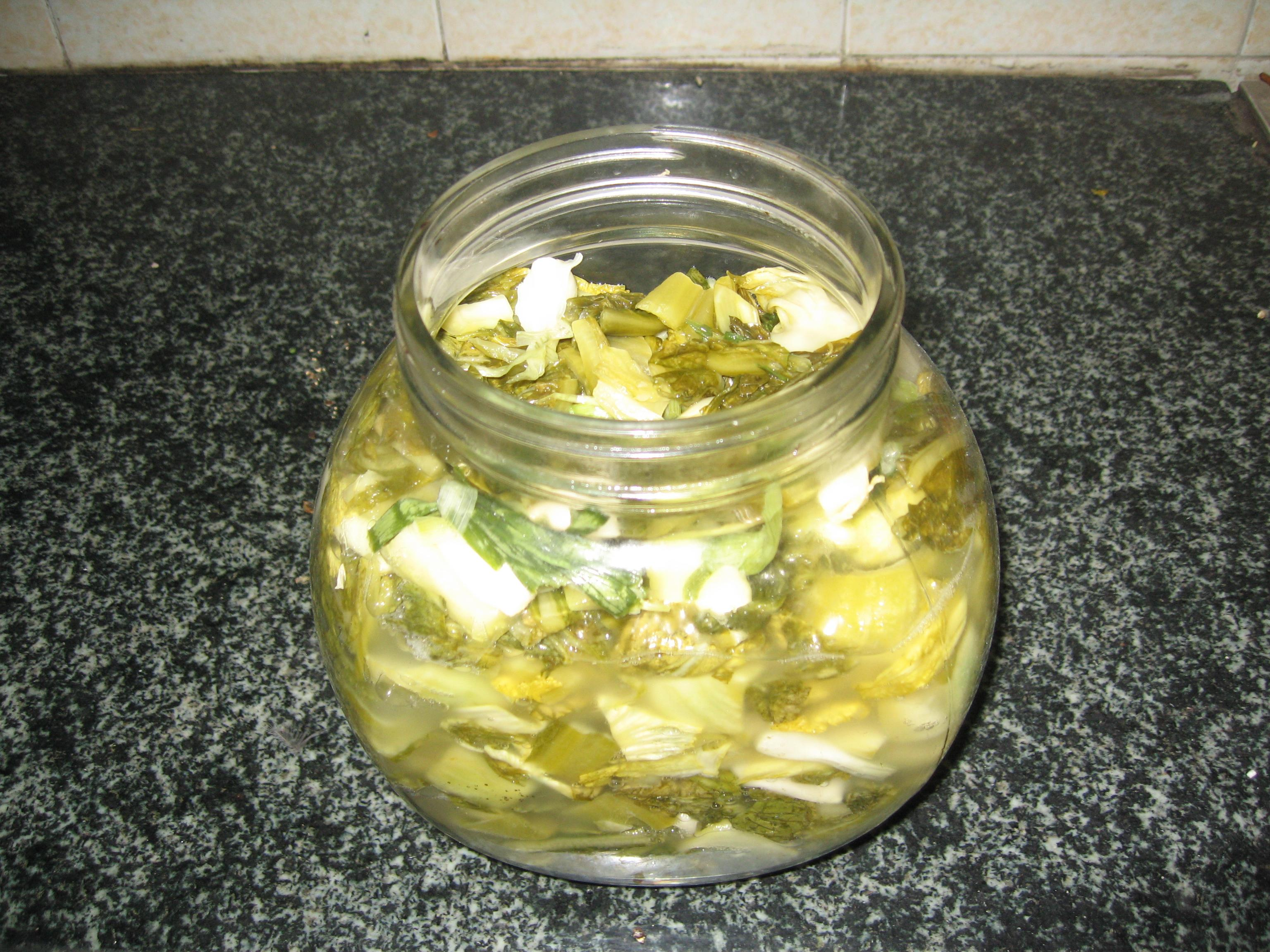
Vietnamese dưa cải muối

Two distinct types of suancai are found in China:

1. Northern China has used napa cabbage (Chinese: 大白菜; pinyin: dàbáicài) as the traditional vegetable of choice.
2. Southern and Western China uses the thick stalk varieties of Chinese mustard (Chinese: 芥菜; pinyin: jìecai; Jyutping: gaai3 coi3) variety to make suancai.

Production of suancai differs from other paocai in that the vegetable is compressed. This is accomplished by placing a heavy weight, such as a large rock, on top of the cover of the container so that the Chinese cabbage inside the container is slowly pressed as fermentation takes place. The processing of the vegetable helps to create a distinct flavor.

Suancai is often used in cooking with meat, especially pork. It is said to neutralize the grease of the meat.

During wintertime, cabbages, mixed with salt, are preserved in jars and crocks to await fermentation. The fermentation process will take around one month "at ambient temperature." There are two main methods for spontaneous fermentation by autochthonous microbiota—homemade and industrial processes. In the fermentation of suancai, salt plays an important role in affecting the growth and metabolism of microbes. The higher the salt concentration, the better quality and flavor of the suancai.

== Nutrients ==
Adding nutrients to suan cai can reduce the fermentation time and nitrite content of suan cai, for example, Asp, Thr, Glu, Cys, Tyr, Mg2+, Mn2+ and inosine. With the condition of 10 °C (50 °F), the fermentation time of suan cai is reduced by 5 days compared with that of unsupplemented suan cai, and the nitrite content of suan cai supplemented with these nutrients was approximately 0.7 times less than that of suan cai without supplemented nutrients.

== Regional ==
=== Muslim regions in China ===
In Chinese Islamic cuisine, suancai can top off noodle soups, especially beef noodle soup.

=== Hakka ===
In Hakka cuisine, suancai (called soen choi in Hakka) is a common pantry staple used in many Hakka dishes, including stir fries.

=== Hunan ===
In Hunan, suancai is frequently made with ginger and chilies (typical of Hunan cuisine).

=== Guangdong and Hong Kong ===
In Cantonese cuisine, it is served in a small dish, often as an appetizer, and usually free. Sometimes it can be available in mini-containers on the dining table. There are also Cantonese variations such as salted suancai (鹹酸菜).

=== Northeast China ===
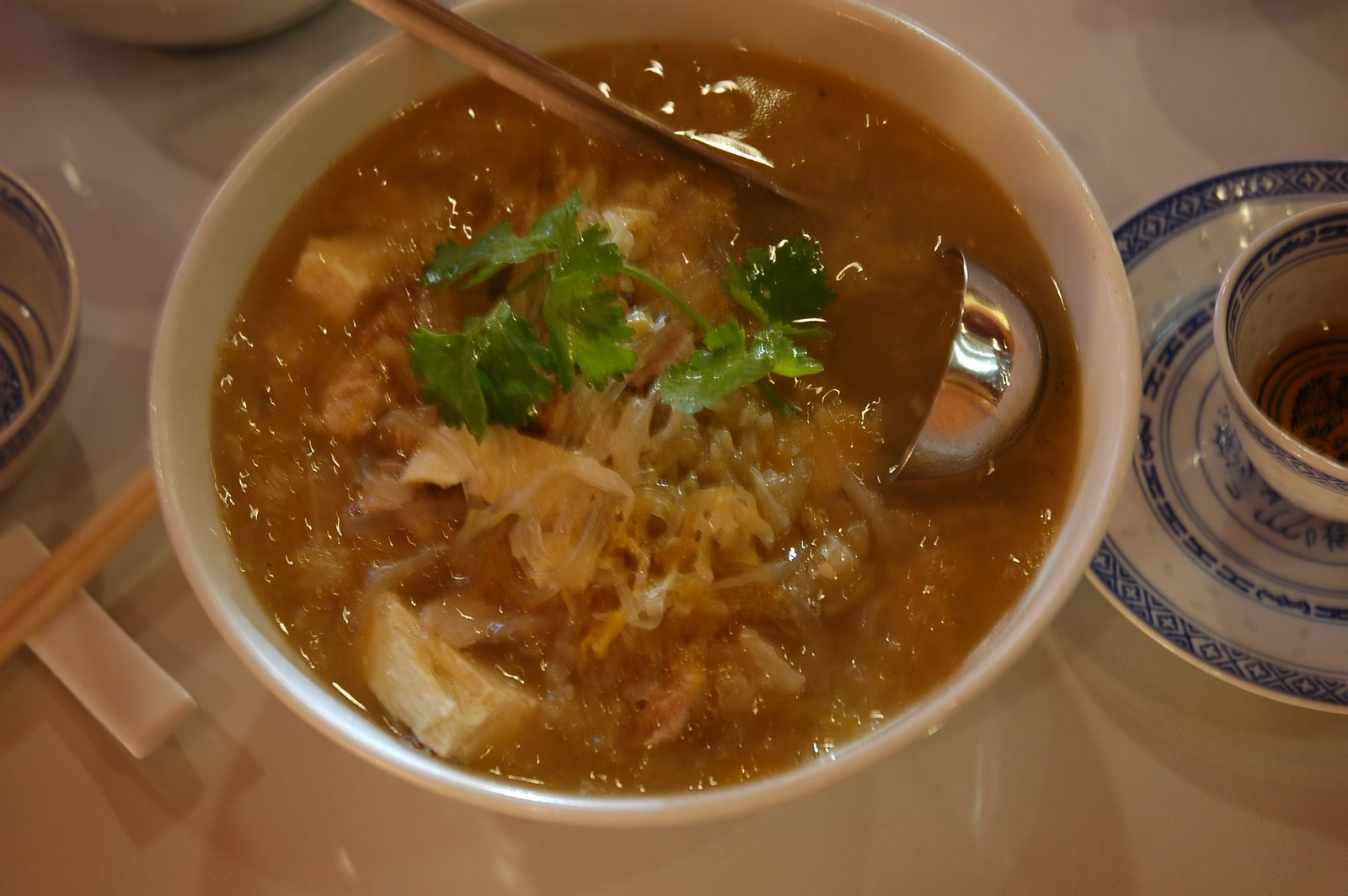
Suancai stewed with pork and cellophane noodle is a very common dish in Northeastern China

In Northeastern Chinese cuisine, suancai is made from napa cabbage and has a taste similar to sauerkraut. As part of the cuisine in Manchuria, it is used with dumplings and boiled, or stir fried. More frequently, suancai is used to make suancai and pork stew.

=== Hot pot ===
In hot pot cuisine, it is often one of the ingredients.

=== Sichuan ===
In Sichuan cuisine, the dish suancai yu (simplified Chinese: 酸菜鱼; traditional Chinese: 酸菜魚; pinyin: Suāncài yú) uses suancai. This dish is served in a broth.

=== In Thailand ===
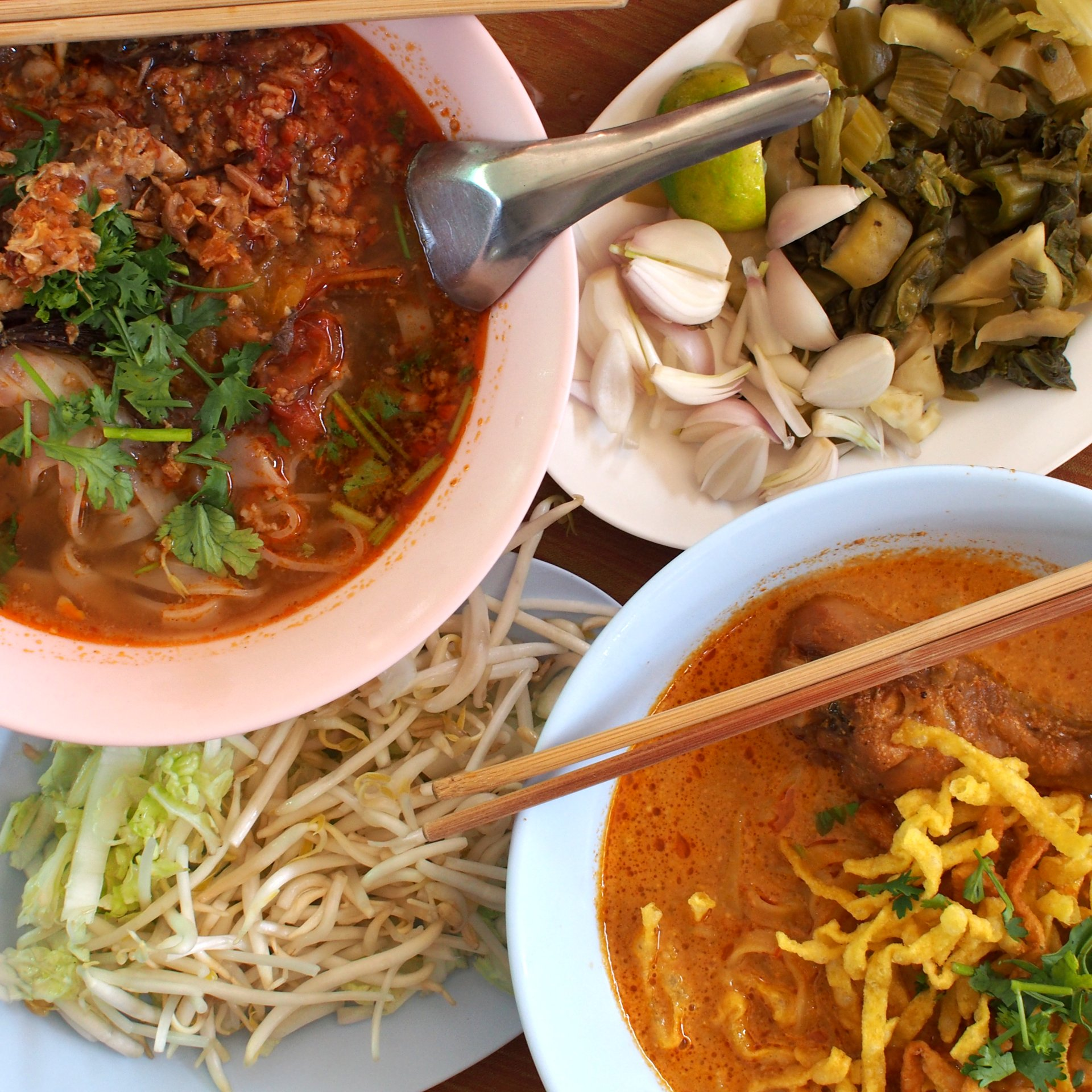
Two styles of khao soi. Pickled cabbage is used as a condiment with the curry version of khao soi.

Suancai has also been incorporated into Thai cuisine, where it is known as phak kat dong (ผักกาดดอง) when only the upper stem and leaf are used'. Most often used in Thai-Chinese dishes, it can also be served as an ingredient in a Thai salad, or as a condiment such as with khao soi, a northern Thai curry-noodle soup. The chopped sour leaf and upper stem is combined with scrambled egg in the dish pak khat dong pat kai. When the dish includes only the main stem and tuber of the cabbage (in the style of zha cai), it is called chee chuan chai in Thai.

=== In Vietnam ===
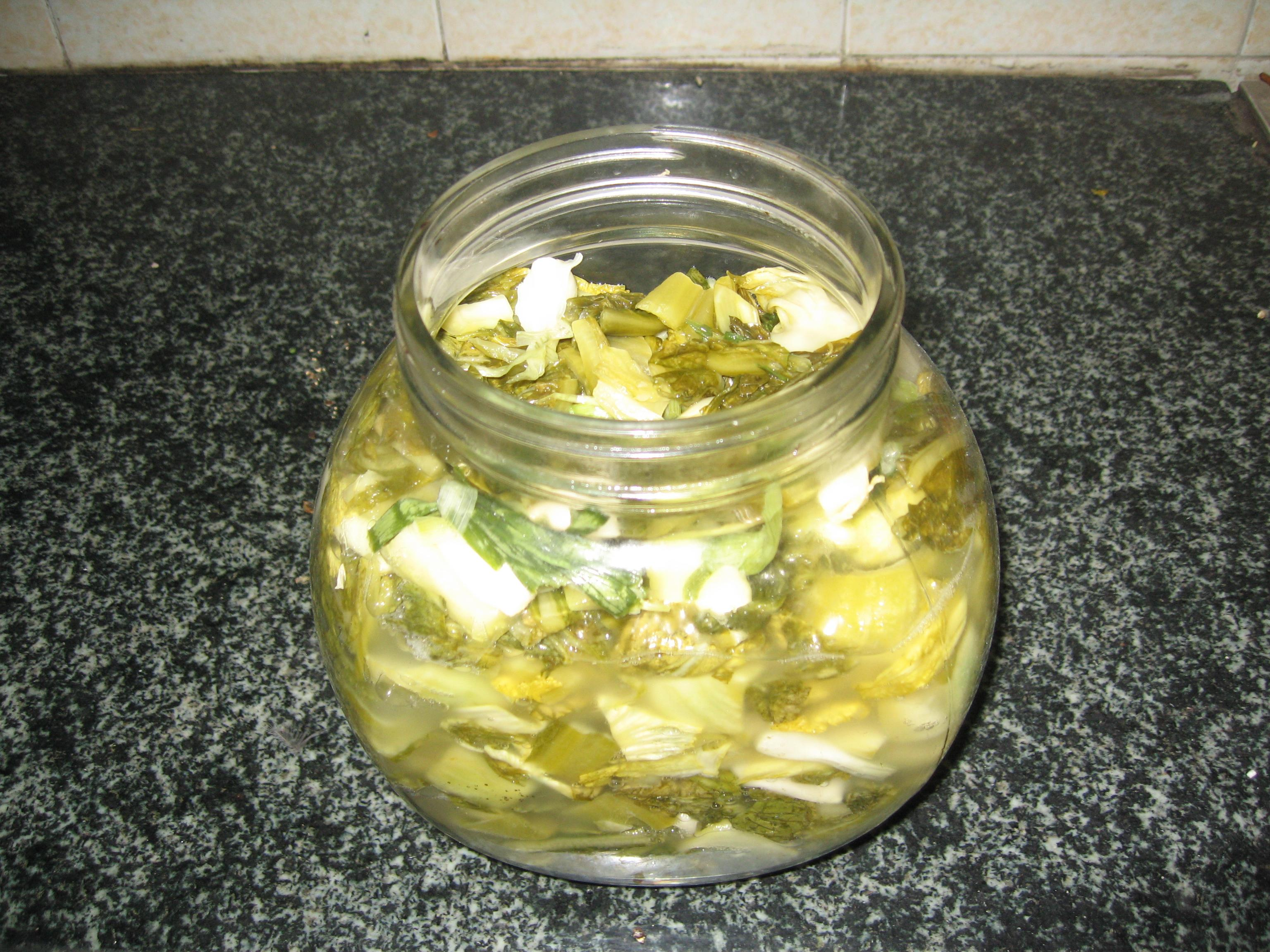
A jar of dưa cải muối

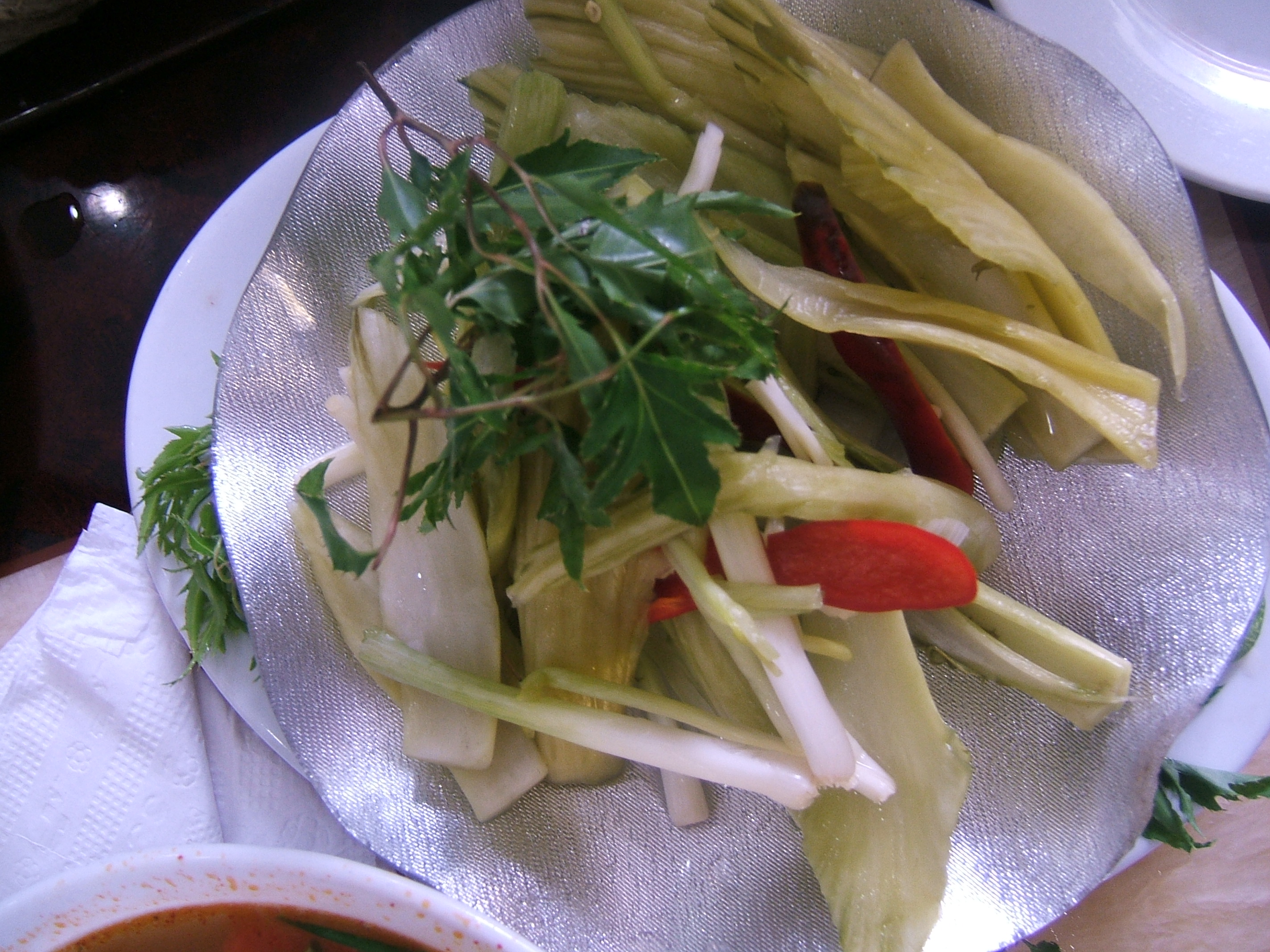
A plate of dưa muối

Pickled mustard or dưa cải chua is a traditional staple in Vietnamese cuisine, using green mustard instead of Chinese cabbage. It is used as a side relish or in dishes such as thịt kho dưa cải (braised pork and pickled mustard), canh cải chua (sour mustard soup) and cơm rang dưa bò (fried rice with beef and pickles).

== Comparison ==
Suancai is similar to a fermented-cabbage dish, sauerkraut, which is common in the cuisines of Central and Eastern Europe.

== In popular culture ==
A popular sitcom and namesake song depicting lives in Northeast China titled Cui Hua Shang Suancai (翠花, 上酸菜, lit. 'Green Flower, serve the sour greens') debuted in 2001, and the phrase Cui Hua Shang Suancai became a popular catch phrase. A company in China registered "Cui Hua" brand packaged suancai.

== See also ==
- Sauerkraut – A finely cut raw cabbage fermented by various lactic acid bacteria
- Kimchi – a Korean dish made with fermented cabbage in chili peppers
- Zha cai – Pickled mustard plant stem from Chongqing, China
- Tianjin preserved vegetable – Type of pickled Chinese cabbage from Tianjin, China
- Meigan cai – Type of dry pickled Chinese mustard
- Gundruk – Nepali fermented vegetable dish
- List of cabbage dishes
