= Pao cai =

Pickle in Chinese cuisine

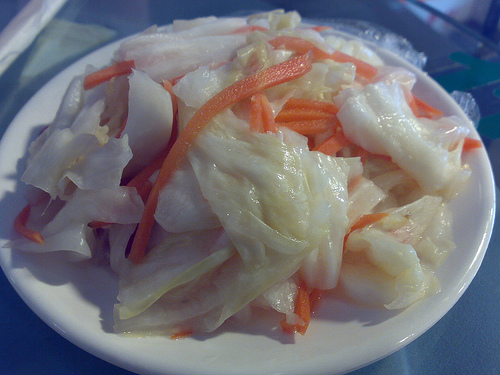
- Chinese: 泡菜
- Hanyu Pinyin: pàocài
- Literal meaning: pickled vegetable
Transcriptions
Standard Mandarin
- Hanyu Pinyin: pàocài
- Wade–Giles: p'ao^{4} ts'ai^{4}
Southern Min
- Hokkien POJ: phàu-chhài

Pao cai (Chinese: 泡菜; pinyin: pàocài; Wade–Giles: p'ao^{⁴} ts'ai^{⁴}; lit. 'soaked vegetables'), also romanized as pao tsai, is a generic term for pickled, specifically fermented in brine, vegetables in Chinese.

There are more than 11 varieties of pickled vegetables across China, but pao cai by itself usually refers to Sichuanese pao cai (Chinese: 四川泡菜), primarily produced and consumed in southwestern China. A wide variety of vegetables (including Chinese cabbage, cabbage, radish, mustard stems, long beans, peppers, daikon, carrots, and ginger), are placed with spices into a seasoned brine and kept shut. It is widely used as side dishes, appetizers, and condiments because of its crisp texture, special fragrance, and health benefits originating from its lactic acid fermentation. Sichuan pao cai is produced both domestically in locals' daily life and commercially in industry, and it is popular throughout China.

Other names applied to pao cai include Sichuan pickle, Chinese sauerkraut, and pickled cabbage.

== History ==
Claims of the history of Sichuan pao cai date variously back to the Shang Dynasty, though such sources do not necessarily mention Sichuan specifically. Specific mention of Sichuan pao cai occurs in the Qing Dynasty, when locals are said to use pao cai as a dowry. The custom remains in some parts of Sichuan to this day, demonstrating the importance of pao cai in people's lives since ancient times.

In the history of the development of pao cai in China, Sichuan paocai has been widely recorded, whether it is the climate and soil suitable for growing raw vegetables for pao cai, the technology of pao cai production, the fermentation containers of pao cai (i.e. pao cai jar), the popularity of pao cai or the status in the pao cai industry.

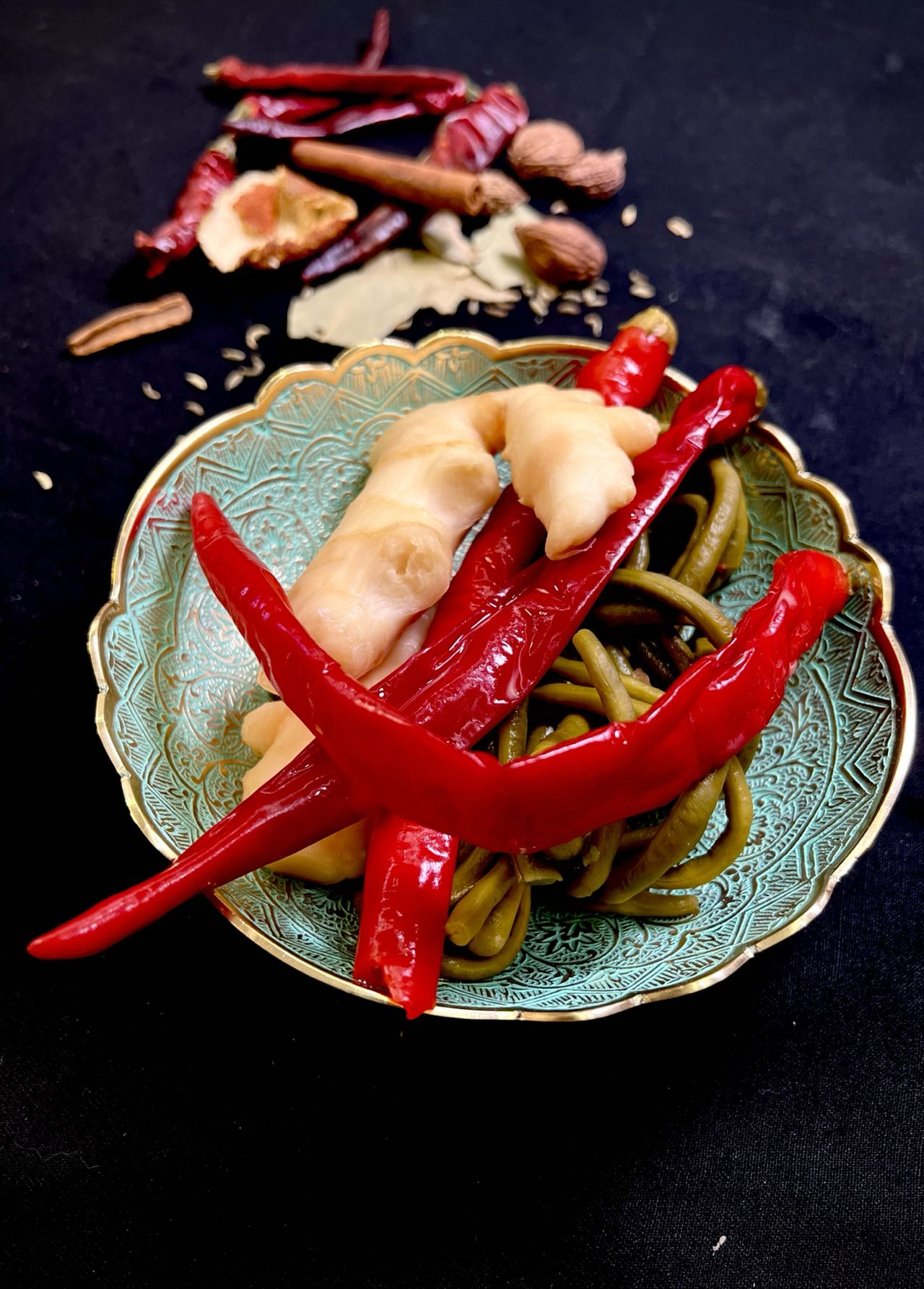
Sichuan paocai (chilli, ginger and cowpea）

== Production ==
The Sichuan pao cai is commonly made from fresh or salted vegetables like radish, carrot, and cowpea with anaerobic fermentation under ambient temperature based on the microbes present on the raw materials. The microbes are mainly lactic acid bacteria (LAB) which grows preferentially under the fermentation conditions. The raw materials are immersed in brine (a 6–8% salt concentration) seasoned by dressings like ginger, chili, Sichuan pepper, and garlic. Local people in Sichuan utilize aged pao cai brine for fermentation. If the aged brine is not spoiled, it is often reused for many years or even decades. The aged Sichuan pao cai brine can provide great amounts of lactic acid bacteria, which helps it to grow rapidly and become the dominant microorganisms.

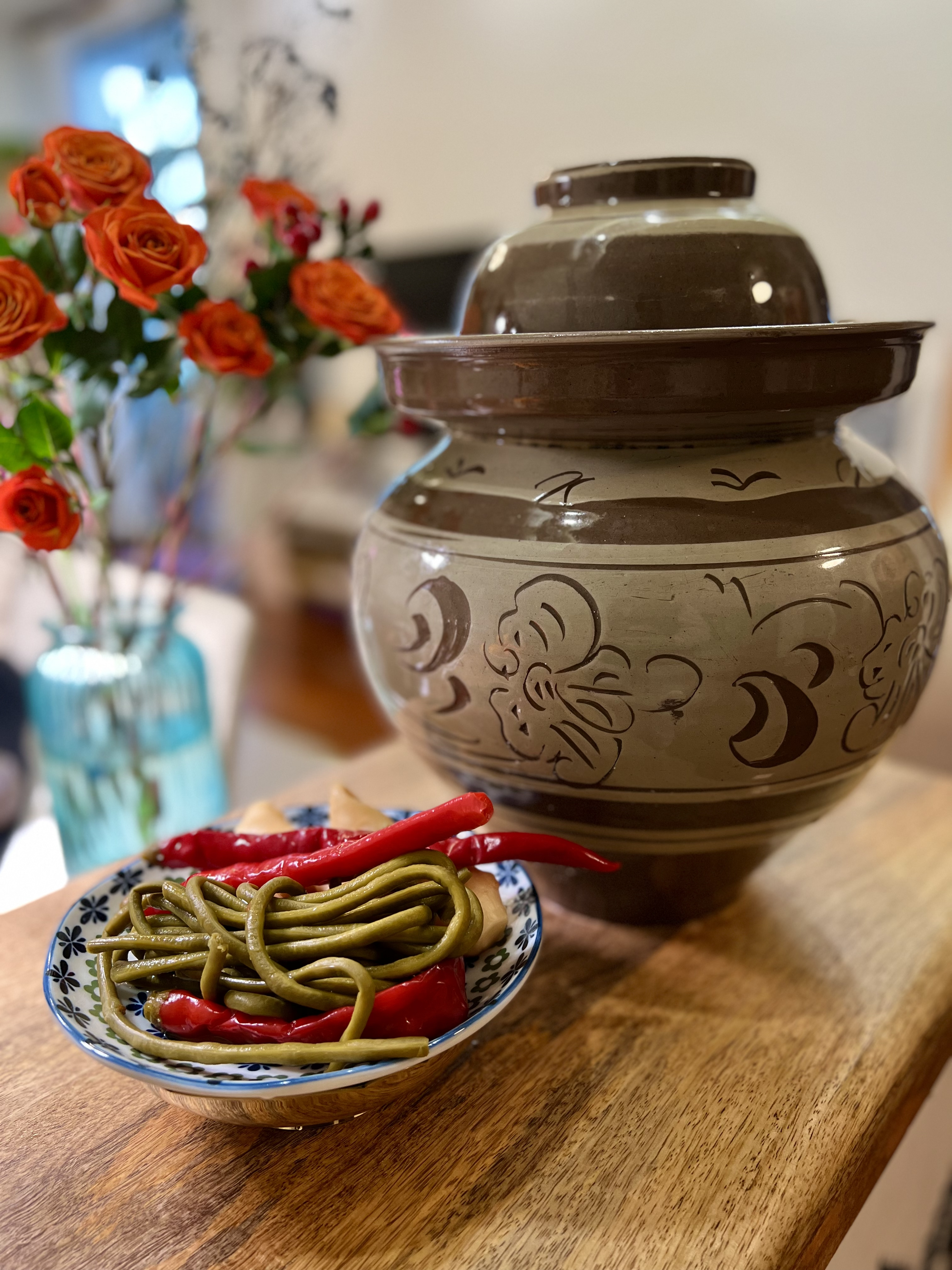
Sichuan pao cai and pao cai Jar

The production of homemade Sichuan pao cai utilizes specially designed jars. The top of the jar is surrounded by an eave-like circle notch and the lid is upside down like a bowl at the top of the jar. The notch is filled with water to seal the jar and create an anaerobic environment for lactic acid bacteria. The gas produced by microbes during the process of fermentation inside the jar can escape the jar through dissolving in the water. Many local families in Sichuan have pao cai jars at home.

In industrial production, Sichuan pao cai is classified into three categories: fermented pickles, instant pickles, and other pickles. Fermented pickles are firstly soaked in salted water for fermentation and then add bittern or solution in it. The solid materials are less than 50% and will not separate from the liquid. Instant pickles will also be soaked in salted water in the first place. Then they are reshaped, desalted, dressed, packaged, and sterilized on the assembly line. Other pickles utilize many other vegetable such as mushrooms, legumes, and seaweed besides the traditional ingredients.

== Pao cai industry in Sichuan ==
China's pao cai industry has grown rapidly in recent years, with a market size of more than 40 billion yuan, pao cai enterprises are mainly concentrated in the Sichuan region, the output value of Sichuan pao cai reached 33 billion yuan in 2018, accounting for 70.21% of the national total output value, of which Meishan's output value of up to 16 billion yuan, accounting for 48.48% of the output value of Sichuan pao cai.

With the rapid growth of the industry scale, the accompanying environmental pollution problems have been intensified, especially the discharge of high salinity wastewater, which will deteriorate water quality, affect the growth and reproduction of aquatic organisms, especially fish, and cause groundwater pollution and soil salinization. In turn, these affect the safety of drinking water and agricultural production in the watershed. The environmental problems faced by the industry development are the important constraints that inhibit the sustainable development of the Chinese pao cai industry.

== Health benefits ==
Sichuan pao cai has abundant fibers, vitamins, minerals, and small amounts of carbohydrates, which can help to achieve the balance of dietary nutrition. Because of the rich lactic acid bacteria in Sichuan pao cai, bacteria that cause intestinal diseases can be inhibited, leading to the microbiological balance in the intestines. In some Sichuan areas, the Sichuan pao cai brine is used to treat diarrhea, colds, and other diseases. Moreover, some types of lactic acid bacteria in Sichuan pao cai may help with oral health by affecting the oral microbiome. Also, the lactic acid bacteria separated from Sichuan pao cai can be made into drugs, significantly reducing the fat accumulation and thus resisting fat livers.

== Kimchi controversy ==
In Chinese, kimchi is translated as "Korean pao cai" or "Korean pickles" (simplified Chinese: 韩国泡菜; traditional Chinese: 韓國泡菜). However a misunderstanding over the translation of "pao cai" in Chinese media in 2020, has led to tensions between China and South Korea over the origins of kimchi, and is one of the soft power conflicts between the two countries. According to Dr Sojin Lim, the co-director of Institute of Korean Studies at the University of Central Lancashire, Korean kimchi is often called "pao cai" in China, but China has its own fermented vegetable dish that is also called as "pao cai", despite the two dishes being different.

Due to a Chinese linguistic idiosyncrasy of typically using the same word when referring to both Korean kimchi and Sichuanese "pao cai", on 7 November 2013, the Korean government announced that the new Chinese translation of the term kimchi would be 辛奇 (pinyin: xīnqí), which is a phono-semantic matching of Korean kimchi and can also mean "spicy and extraordinary". On 14 May 2014, since this term has still not become popular despite the promotion of the Korean government, the National Institute of the Korean Language announced that the translation would be reverted to "pao cai". On 22 July 2021, the Ministry of Culture, Sports and Tourism of Korea announced that the translation would once again be reverted to "xinqi".

== ISO 24220 ==
On November 24, 2020, a global regulator issued an international standard for the pao cai industry which was developed under Chinese leadership and led by the Meishan Municipal Bureau of Market Supervision in Sichuan Province. The global regulator, the International Organization for Standardization (ISO), set standardized definitions of the “categories” and “requirements” of pao cai, with the objectives of facilitating the international trade and distribution of pao cai by developing unified and explicit product quality and safety guarantees for the industry.

The ISO standard used the name, pao cai, in Mandarin for these fermented vegetables that are popular in the western Chinese province of Sichuan, and explicitly excluded kimchi in its definition by stating "the document does not apply to kimchi".

== See also ==
- Zha cai – Pickled mustard plant stem from Chongqing, China (another Sichuanese dish)
- Suan cai – Traditional Chinese pickled vegetables
- Meigan cai – Type of dry pickled Chinese mustard
- Sauerkraut – Finely sliced and fermented cabbage
- Torshi – Procedure of preserving food in brine or vinegar
- Pickling (East Asia) – Procedure of preserving food in brine or vinegar
- List of salads
