= Journal of the Science of Food and Agriculture =

- Discipline: Agriculture
- Language: English
- Edited by: Mark Shepherd and Andrew Waterhouse

Publication details
- History: 1950-present
- Publisher: John Wiley & Sons
- Frequency: 15/year
- Open access: yes
- Impact factor: 3.639 (2020)

Standard abbreviations
- ISO 4: J. Sci. Food Agric.

Indexing
- CODEN: JSFAAE
- ISSN: 0022-5142 (print); 1097-0010 (web)
- LCCN: 55015190
- OCLC no.: 1782672

Links
- Journal homepage; Online access; Online archive

The Journal of the Science of Food and Agriculture is a peer-reviewed scientific journal. It was established in 1950 and is published 15 times a year by John Wiley & Sons on behalf of the Society of Chemical Industry. The journal is included in the Index Medicus (MEDLINE).
