= Meigan cai =

Type of dry pickled Chinese mustard

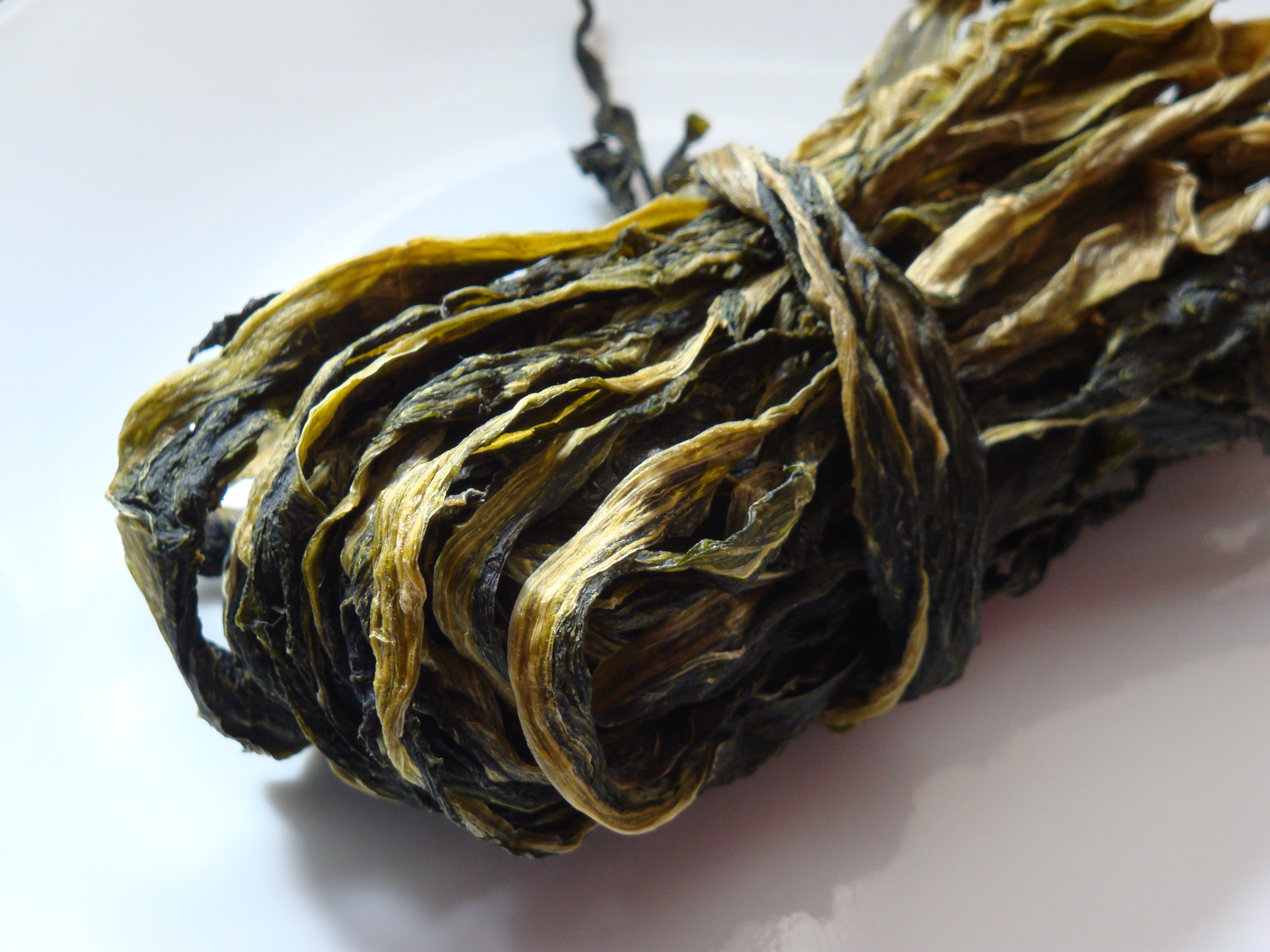
- A bundle of meigan cai

Meigan cai
- Traditional Chinese: 梅乾菜
- Simplified Chinese: 梅干菜
- Literal meaning: plum dried vegetable
Transcriptions
Standard Mandarin
- Hanyu Pinyin: méigāncài
- Wade–Giles: mei^{2}-kan^{1} ts'ai^{4}

Meicai
- Chinese: 梅菜
- Literal meaning: plum vegetable
Transcriptions
Standard Mandarin
- Hanyu Pinyin: méicài
- Wade–Giles: mei^{2} ts'ai^{4}
Hakka
- Romanization: mòi chhoi
Yue: Cantonese
- Jyutping: mui4 coi3

Second alternative Chinese name
- Chinese: 霉菜
- Literal meaning: moldy vegetable
Transcriptions
Standard Mandarin
- Hanyu Pinyin: méicài

Meigan cai, also called mei cai or mui choy, is a type of dry pickled Chinese mustard of the Hakka people from Huizhou, Guangdong province, China. Meigan cai is also used in the cuisine of Shaoxing (绍兴), Zhejiang province, China.

The pickle consists of a whole head of various varieties of 芥菜 (Chinese mustard), 油菜 (rape), and 白菜 (Chinese cabbage) that has undergone an elaborate process consisting of drying, steaming, and salting. The vegetables are harvested, trimmed before the Qingming Festival, and sun-dried until limp. It is then salted or brined, kneaded until the juices are exuded, and left to ferment in large clay urns for 15 to 20 days. The vegetable is then repeatedly steamed and dried until reddish brown in colour and highly fragrant.

== Uses ==
=== Culinary ===
This pickled vegetable is used to flavor stews, in particular, meigan cai cooked with pork (梅菜扣肉), a classic dish from Hakka cuisine. In this dish, slices of pork belly are parboiled and then deep-fried before being steamed with meigan cai.

=== Pastry ===
Meigan cai can also be used as a filling for vegetarian baozi, known as meicaibao (梅菜包), and to make pork belly bao buns (梅菜扣肉包).

== See also ==
- Zha cai – Pickled mustard plant stem from Chongqing, China
- Suan cai – Traditional Chinese pickled vegetables
- Pao cai – Pickle in Chinese cuisine
- Gundruk – Nepali fermented vegetable dish
