= Tianjin preserved vegetable =

Type of pickled Chinese cabbage from Tianjin, China

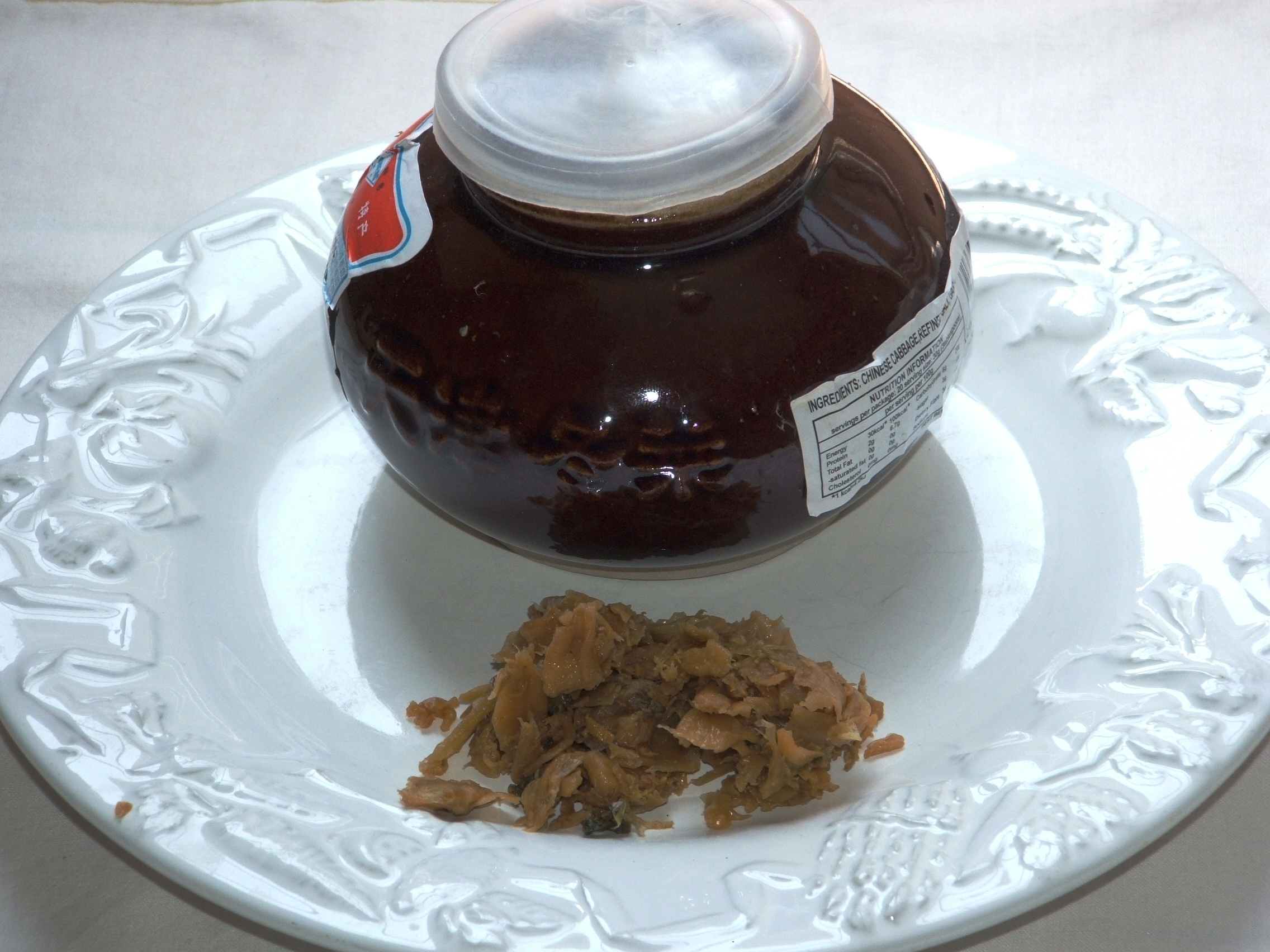
A jar of Tianjin preserved vegetable

Tianjin preserved vegetable (Chinese: 天津冬菜; pinyin: Tiānjīn dōngcài; lit. 'Tianjin winter vegetable'; also called tung tsai (Chinese: 冬菜), Tientsin preserved vegetable or Tianjin preserved cabbage) is a type of pickled napa cabbage originating in Beijing and Tianjin region of China. It consists of finely chopped "arrow-shaft" cabbage (箭杆菜 jiàngān-cài; a variety with an elongated stalk) and salt. Garlic is also generally added in the pickling process, although it is omitted in versions prepared for consumption by members of certain Chinese Buddhist sects, who practice strict Buddhist vegetarianism and do not consume garlic or other spicy foods. This pickled vegetable is used to flavor soups, stir-fries or stewed dishes.

Tianjin preserved vegetable is commercially available in earthenware crocks or clear plastic packages.

== See also ==
- Chinese pickles – Vegetables or fruits that have been fermented by pickling with salt and brine
- List of cabbage dishes
