= Zhacai =

Pickled mustard plant stem from Chongqing, China

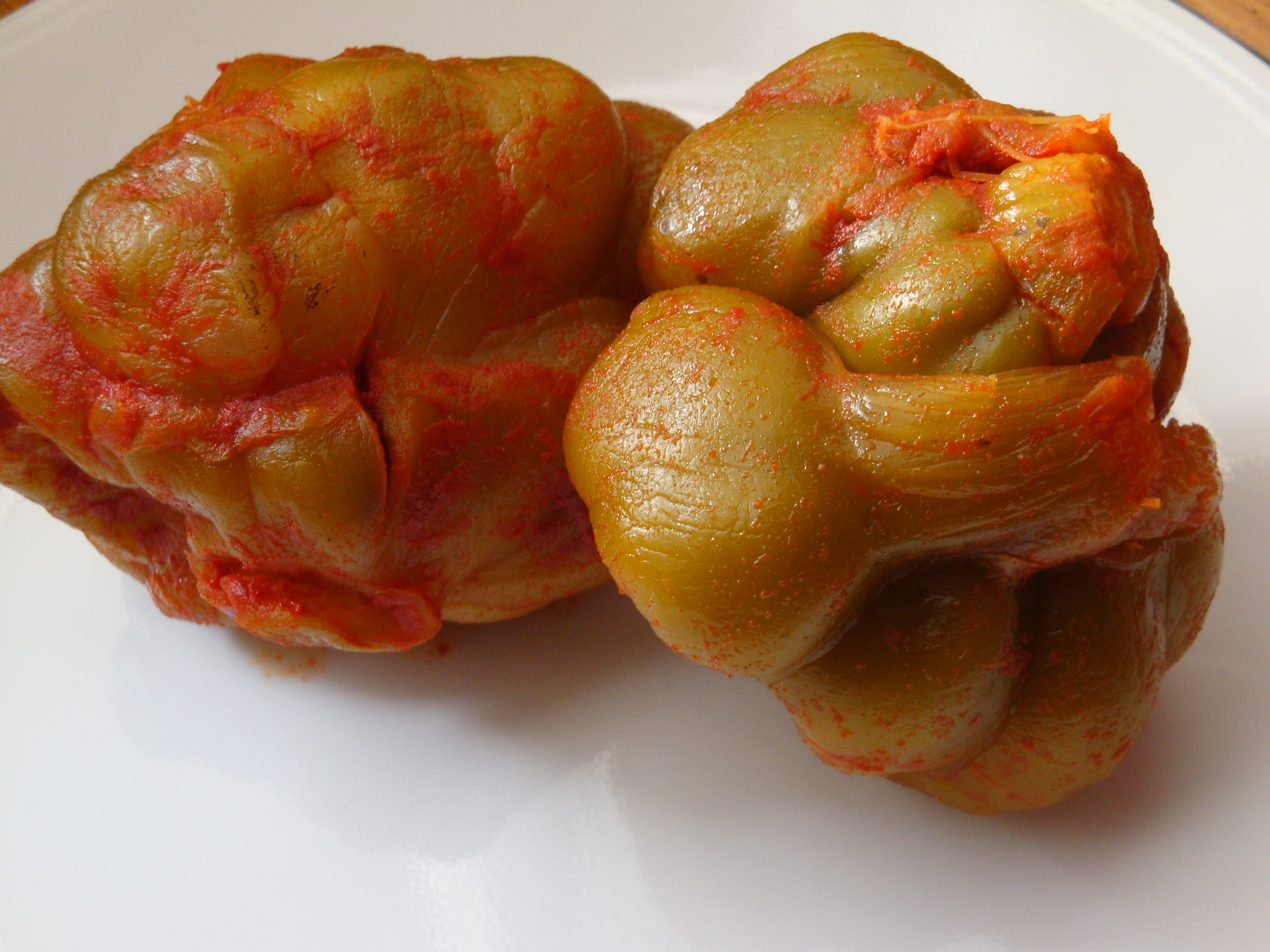
- Whole heads of zhacai coated in chili paste
- Chinese: 榨菜
Transcriptions
Standard Mandarin
- Hanyu Pinyin: zhàcài
- Wade–Giles: cha^{4} ts'ai^{4}

Zhacai (Chinese: 榨菜; lit. 'pressed greens') is a pickled Chinese mustard tuber popular in Sichuan province. It is made from the tumida variety of Brassica juncea, grown mostly around the Yangtze river in Fuling District, Chongqing. Generally harvested around February to March, the raw tubers are placed in cement pools and marinated in brine solutions to slow lactic acid fermentation and allow for complex flavor development. After an increasing amount of time in each of the three or four stages, they are taken out of the brine and pressed dry. Following several months of pickling, they are placed in jars alongside seasonings such as chili peppers, Sichuan peppercorns, and dried ginger, and left to ferment. The resulting pickle is very spicy, with intense salty, sour, and umami flavors, and used as an appetizer, garnish, or seasoning in Sichuan cuisine, often paired with meat dishes such as twice-cooked pork. Described as the most widely-known Chinese pickle overseas, it is often available at international Chinese grocery stores.

Although mustard greens have been used in Chinese cooking since the 6th century CE, pickled mustard stems are attested during the Qing dynasty in the 19th century. Likely evolving from local pickling traditions in Sichuan, the invention of zhacai is often attributed to the Qing dynasty pickle producer Qiu Shou'an and his farmhand Deng Bingcheng, who began processing the tumida tubers in a similar manner to datoucai pickles and exported them to be sold in Yichang, Hubei. During the early 20th century, zhacai companies emerged around Chongqing—especially in Fuling and in Luoqi, Jiangbei District—and began exporting the product across China and into Southeast Asia. Zhacai production was placed under state control following the establishment of the People's Republic, and was most sidelined in favor of other crops during the Great Leap Forward. After reaching its lowest level of production in 1961, cultivation grew throughout the 1960s and 1970s. About 1,000,000 metric tons of zhacai are produced in China every year, about a fifth of all pickled vegetables produced in the country.

== Production ==
Fresh zhacai tubers

Pickled vegetables are common throughout Chinese cuisine, with pickling used both to preserve ingredients and to impart flavor. The most common pickles varies between regions, with cruciferous plants especially common in northern and eastern China, fruits in the south, and chili peppers around Sichuan province in the west. Varieties of the cruciferous genus Brassica commonly used for pickling include Napa cabbage (Brassica rapa var. pekinensis, used for yancai), choy sum (Brassica rapa var. parachinensis, used for paocai), and various cultivars of Chinese mustard (Brassica juncea), including foliosa (used for suancai), multisecta (used for xuelihong), and napiformis (used for datoucai). In Sichuan, the tubers of the tumida variety of B. juncea is used to make zhacai (榨菜; 'pressed greens').

Plants of the tumida cultivar—also known simply as zhacai—have thick stems and petioles with fleshy bases. Their seedlings closely resemble the related multisecta variety, except with a smoother texture, enlarged rosette stems, and lumpy petioles. This cultivar is known by a wide variety of other names in Sichuan, such as yangjiaocai (羊角菜; 'ram's horn greens'), naitoucai (羊角菜; 'nipple greens'), lingcai (菱菜; 'water caltrop greens') or jiecai (芥菜; 'mustard greens').

About 1,000,000 metric tons of zhacai are produced in China every year, comprising about a fifth of China's pickled vegetable production. Most production occurs near the Yangtze in the vicinity of Fuling, Chongqing, its traditional place of origin, although smaller amounts are grown in other parts of Sichuan, Zhejiang, and Hunan. About 120,000 hectares (300,000 acres) of farmland is used to grow zhacai tubers in Chongqing, with about 30,000 hectares (74,000 acres) in Sichuan. Chongqing produces about 70% of China's zhacai, with about 50% in Fuling alone.

Zhacai mustard greens are traditionally planted in bailu (the solar term around mid-September) and harvested the next year in yushui (around late February to early March). The climate of the Fuling area has cool winters, ranging from 4 to 10 °C (39 to 50 °F) for much of the growth period, resulting in slowly-growing plants with dense cells.

=== Pickling and fermentation ===
Whole and halved zhacai tubers before (top) and after pickling

For commercial production of zhacai, the raw tubers are peeled and air-dried, before being placed in cement pools and marinated in a brine solution for about 7 days. After the tubers are removed and pressed to remove the brine, they are placed in another brine pool (often saltier than the first) for 20 to 30 days. They are then pressed and placed in a third, saltier pickling brine for anywhere between 4 to 6 months, before being again pressed to dry. The salty brines inhibit microorganisms and enzymes present in the tubers. In the third pickling stage, the high salt content greatly slows microbial lactic acid fermentation, allowing for a longer pickling period and the emergence of more complex flavors. An alternative pickling process developed by the 2010s instead uses four stages using reduced saltiness, removing the tubers once a desired acidity level is reached for each stage. This allows for the pickling process to be shortened under 4 months, and reduces the effort needed to desalinate the tubers following pickling.

Following the final stage of pickling, the pickled tubers are trimmed, packed into jars alongside seasonings, and left to ferment. The traditional seasoning mix includes chili peppers, Sichuan peppercorns, black pepper, dried ginger, star anise, and licorice root. Some carbohydrates in the tubers are converted to amino acids and monosaccharides during the fermentation process, resulting in savory and sweet flavors respectively. Microbes also produce compounds such as esters, aldehydes, and alcohols during fermentation, giving the zhacai a distinct aroma. Pungency comes from glucosinolate compounds present in the tubers.

Zhacai is sold in whole, sliced, diced, or shredded form. Zhacai-flavored sauces are also available. Pre-packaged sliced or shredded zhacai is often sold in 70-to-100-gram (2.5 to 3.5 oz) packages, although smaller packages are made as instant noodle toppings or as components of airline meals.

== History ==
Zhacai at a market in Hong Kong

The cultivation of mustard in China dates to at least the Eastern Zhou period (770–256 BCE), with mentions of the plant in the 4th century BCE Zuo Zhuan and the 2th century BCE Mawangdui Silk Texts. Only mustard seed was used until the 6th century CE, when mustard greens began to be cultivated as a vegetable, accompanying the differentiation of the plant into various cultivars. Some folk stories attribute the introduction of pickled mustard greens to Zhuge Liang's army during the Three Kingdoms period of the 3rd century, or to a poor vegetable vendor named Huang Cai during the Qing dynasty in the 18th and 19th centuries. During the Qing dynasty, the tumida (or "big-stem") cultivar of mustard began to enter culinary use. The 1845 Fuzhou Gazetteer (涪州志) mentions the use of mustard stem pickled in brine.

Fuling and (to a lesser extent) Luoqi (a town in Jiangbei District, Chongqing) have both been claimed as the birthplace of zhacai. Histories of its creation often focus on the first commercial ventures during the late Qing period, although the dish likely originated from local pickling traditions during the High Qing era. During the reign of the Guangxu Emperor (1875–1908), a businessman named Zeng Decheng (曾德诚) purportedly made an attempt to export "pickled mustard green heads" (泡青菜头) from Sichuan.

According to various local histories and gazettes of Fuling, a pickle producer in Xiaqiujiwan, Fuling, named Qiu Shou'an (邱寿安) began to air-dry mustard stems prior to salting and pickling, naming the product zhacai after the use of wooden boxes to press out the brine after pickling. According to some histories, a farmhand of Qiu's named Deng Bingcheng, experienced with processing datoucai, had recommended Qiu to process tumida tubers in a similar manner to datoucai. Qiu sent zhacai to a condiment shop owned by his brother in Yichang, Hubei, in 1898; this purportedly became so popular among merchants than Qiu founded a factory dedicated to zhacai production. The Qiu family enjoyed a monopoly on zhacai export until 1909, when other local producers began to export the product.

=== Industrial expansion ===
The pickle became widely known across China during the Republican era (1912–1949), often under the name chuancai (川菜; 'Sichuan vegetable'). Wide-scale commercial export of zhacai is first attested from Fuling, soon followed by similar export ventures in nearby Luoqi, Fengdu, Changshou, and Jiangjin. By 1931, there were over 100 firms producing zhacai in Fuling alone. Luoqi zhacai was generally considered the highest quality during the Republican period, while Fuling zhacai was the most affordable. Hankou (now part of Wuhan) and Shanghai became major distribution centers for zhacai, which began to be exported internationally to Hong Kong and Maritime Southeast Asia. About 600,000 mu (9,884 acres / 4,000 hectares) of farmland in Sichuan was used to grow zhacai in 1935, of which nearly half was in Fuling. During the early 1930s, zhacai began to be produced around Haining, Zhejiang.

Zhacai production methods adapted as exports grew. By 1912, some producers in Fuling began to split the plants before putting them on open-air racks, which greatly increased the speed they dried. By 1928, many commercial producers had switched from the earthenware jars traditionally used to pickle zhacai, replacing them with cement tubs. Some producers began to rub salt into the plant by treading on it.

By the early 20th century, it became common practice to make vegetable soups with zhacai, using leftover drippings from the preparation of twice-cooked pork (huiguorou). Recipes for shredded pork and zhacai appear in early 20th century Sichuan cookbooks, and remain a common dish in the province.

After World War II, a period of economic downturn and hyperinflation severely damaged the Chinese vegetable industry. The number of zhacai producers in Fuling fell from around 500 to 200 between 1948 and 1949, with total output falling from 10,500 to 1,875 tons. In the 1950s, following the establishment of the People's Republic of China, large portions of the zhacai industry was placed under state control. Producers with ties to anti-communist forces had their factories seized and placed under the Fuling Prefecture Native Produce Company (涪陵专区土产公司). The Logistics Department of the East Sichuan Military Region began to produce its own zhacai in 1951, opening or restoring 15 factories along the Yangtze around Chongqing. By 1953, 80% of zhacai production was under state ownership. During the Five-Anti Campaigns, many private producers were prosecuted, and by 1958, all private zhacai factories had become fully state-controlled.

Large areas of farmland used for mustard greens were converted to other crops during the Great Leap Forward, leading production of zhacai to fall to less than 20% of its previous yield. However, yields fell below production quotas, leading the Fuling branch of the Communist Party to launch a campaign against failures in zhacai production. Hitting its lowest level in 1961, production rose through the 1960s and 1970s, although regulatory disruptions during the Cultural Revolution (1966–1976) led to a temporary decline in quality. New regulations were formulated in the 1970s and 1980s, with the Sichuan provincial government codifying standards for zhacai production in 1980. The share in production by township and commune-owned operations grew from 37% in 1981 to 60% in 1985.

Following reform and opening up in the 1980s, zhacai yields increased while new cultivars and varieties were introduced. In 2006, the China National Space Administration sent tumida seeds to space aboard the Shijian 8 satellite in a partnership with local government offices and zhacai companies to study space-induced mutations. It was exported simply under the name "Fuling Pickled Mustard Tuber" during the 1960s and 1970s. Wujiang has been the most widely-exported zhacai brand since the 1980s. Traditionally canned or jarred, smaller plastic film bags of zhacai began to be sold in 1984.

== Uses ==
Beef served with zhacai and coriander

Zhacai has intense salty, sour, and umami flavors. It is generally spicy, although some brands or flavors are comparatively mild. It is one of the "four great pickles" (四大腌菜; sì dà yāncài) used in Sichuan cuisine, alongside datoucai, dongcai, and yacai (all made from Brassica cultivars). (Note: Sometimes numerated as the "five great pickles" along with pao cai) Botanist Hu Shiu-ying described zhacai as the most widely-known Chinese pickle outside of China. It is commonly available at international Chinese grocery stores, often tinned and labeled "Sichuan preserved vegetable".

It is used as an appetizer or topping in Sichuan cooking. Zhacai is often put on rice, porridge, or steamed buns, incorporated into mixed vegetable dishes such as cucumber salad, or finely chopped and mixed into braised or stewed meat dishes. In Youting (within Dazu District, Chongqing) finely-chopped zhacai is commonly used alongside cilantro, crushed peanuts, and deep-fried soybeans in a sauce for crucian carp. Zhacai is sometimes touted as a hangover cure, especially in Japan.

=== Nutrition ===
According to the Chinese Nutrition Society and the Chinese Center for Disease Control and Prevention, 100 grams (3.5 oz) of zhacai contain 140 kilojoules (33 calories), 2.2 grams of protein, 0.3 grams of fat, and 4.25 grams of sodium. It also contains 155 mg of calcium, 2 mg of vitamin C, 41 mg of phosphorus, and 3.9 mg of iron.

== Notes ==
=== Works cited ===
- Dunlop, Fuchsia (2019). The Food of Sichuan. W. W. Norton & Company. ISBN 9781324004844.
- He, Shichang; Li, Gande; Tang, Pengzhu (2014). 榨菜产业经济学研究 [Research on the Economics of the Zhacai Industry] (in Chinese). China Economic Publishing House. ISBN 9787513632546.
- He, Shichang (2017). 涪陵榨菜文化研究 [Research on Fuling Zhacai Culture] (in Chinese). Xinhua. ISBN 9787516633694.
- Hu, Shiu-ying (2005). Food Plants of China. Chinese University of Hong Kong Press. ISBN 9789629962296.
- Lan, Yong (2019). 中国川菜史 [History of Chinese Sichuan Cuisine] (in Chinese). Sichuan Wenyi Chubanshe. ISBN 9787541154553.
- Li, Jing; He, Zhifei; Yan, Lixiu; He, Yunchuan; Yang, Jixia (2023). "Analysis of the Microbial Community Structure and Flavor Components Succession During Salt-Reducing Pickling Process of Zhacai (Preserved Mustard Tuber)". Food Science & Nutrition. 11 (6): 3154–3170. doi:10.1002/fsn3.3297. PMC 10261794. PMID 37324844.
- Lian, Yinyin; Song, Jiajia; Mumby, William; Suo, Huayi; Zhang, Yu (2024). "The Correlation Between Flavor Formation and Microbial Community Dynamics During the Fermentation of Zha cai". Journal of the Science of Food and Agriculture. 104 (10): 6233–6241. Bibcode:2024JSFA..104.6233L. doi:10.1002/jsfa.13447. PMID 38451122.
- Wu, Xiaoyan; Lei, Dongmei; Zhuo, Ma (2024). 川渝地区酱腌菜区域性产业链集群发展现状及对策浅析 [Regional Industrial Chain Clusters for Pickled and Preserved Vegetables in the Sichuan–Chongqing Region: An Analysis of Current Development Status and Countermeasures]. South China Agriculture (in Chinese). 18 (19): 137–140.
- Yang, Jixia; Li, Fengzhu; Zhang, Yuli; He, Zhifei (2021). "Metagenomic Analysis of Microbial Community Succession During the Pickling Process of Zhacai (Preserved Mustard Tuber) and its Correlation with Zhacai Biochemical Indices". Journal of the Science of Food and Agriculture. 101 (4): 1646–1658. Bibcode:2021JSFA..101.1646Y. doi:10.1002/jsfa.10785. PMID 32888329.
