= Stinky tofu =

Chinese fermented tofu with a strong odor

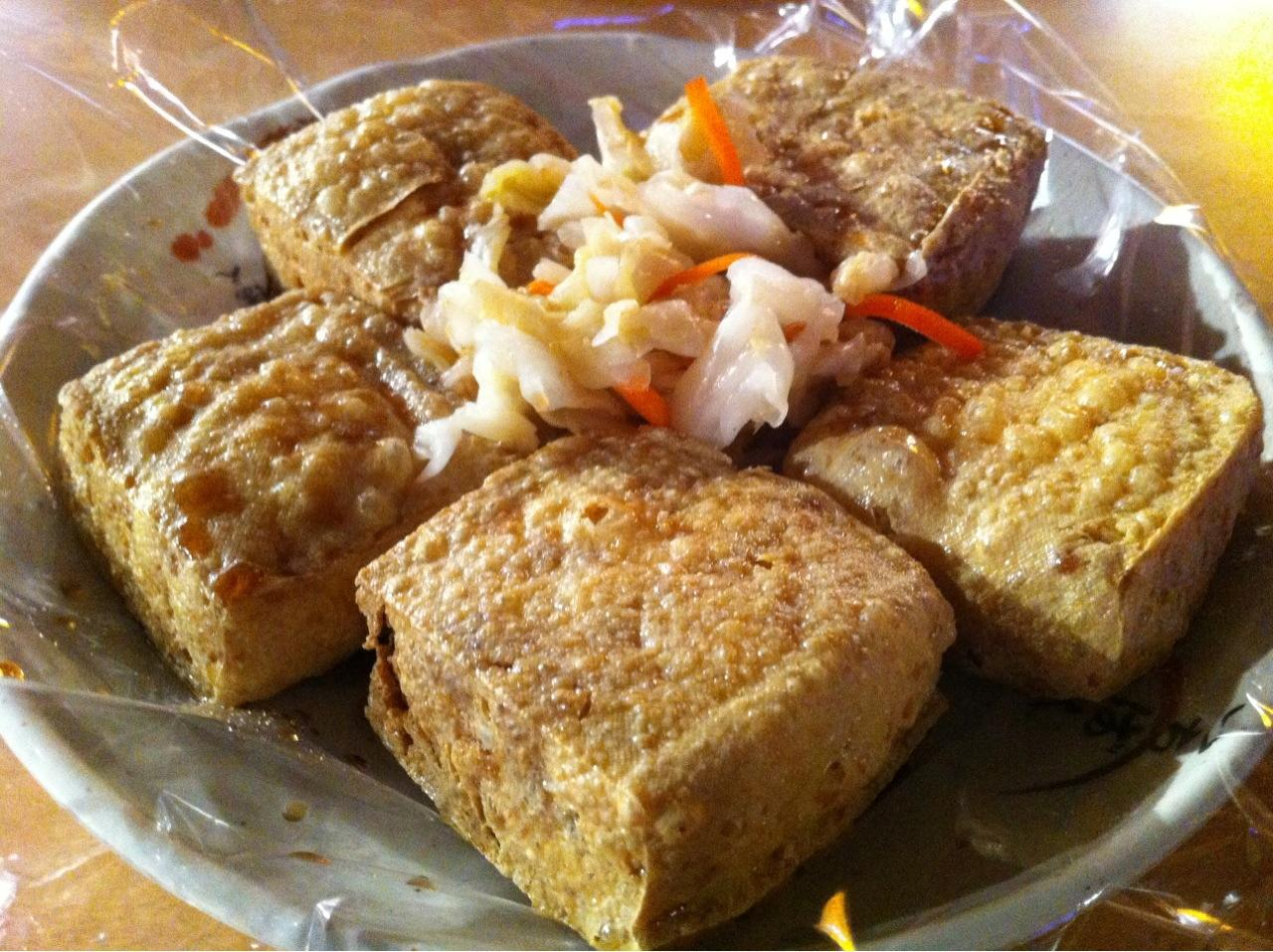
- Place of origin: China
- Region or state: East Asia
- Main ingredients: fermented tofu

Stinky tofu
- Chinese: 臭豆腐
- Literal meaning: stinky tofu
Transcriptions
Standard Mandarin
- Hanyu Pinyin: chòu dòufu
Gan
- Romanization: chhiu2 theu5 fuh
Hakka
- Romanization: Tshu-theu-fú
Yue: Cantonese
- Jyutping: cau3 dau6 fu6
Southern Min
- Hokkien POJ: chhàu-tāu-hū
- Tâi-lô: tshàu-tāu-hū

Stinky tofu (Chinese: 臭豆腐; pinyin: chòu dòufu) is a traditional Chinese delicacy made from fermented tofu, renowned for its distinctive and pungent aroma. Despite its strong odor, it typically has a surprisingly mild and savoury flavour.

It is commonly sold as a snack at night markets or roadside stalls, or served as a side dish in casual eateries rather than in formal restaurants. Traditionally, stinky tofu is fermented for several months in a brine containing vegetables and meat. In contrast, most modern factory-produced versions are soaked in specially prepared brine for just one or two days to develop their characteristic odour.

As its primary ingredient is tofu, the fermentation process—driven by edible moulds—also increases the production of B vitamins while providing a variety of minerals and trace elements.

== Production ==
Unlike cheese, stinky tofu fermentation does not have a fixed formula for starter bacteria; wide regional and individual variations exist in manufacturing and preparation.

The traditional method of producing stinky tofu is to prepare a brine made from fermented milk, vegetables, and meat; the brine can also include dried shrimp, amaranth greens, mustard greens, bamboo shoots, and Chinese herbs. The brine fermentation can take as long as several months.

Modern factories often use quicker methods to mass-produce stinky tofu. Fresh tofu is marinated in prepared brine for only a day or two, especially for fried or boiled cooking purposes. The process only adds odor to the marinated tofu instead of letting it ferment completely.

Depending on the method of production, some stinky tofu can be linked to food poisoning outbreaks, especially if prepared traditionally and cooked at home.

== Preparation ==
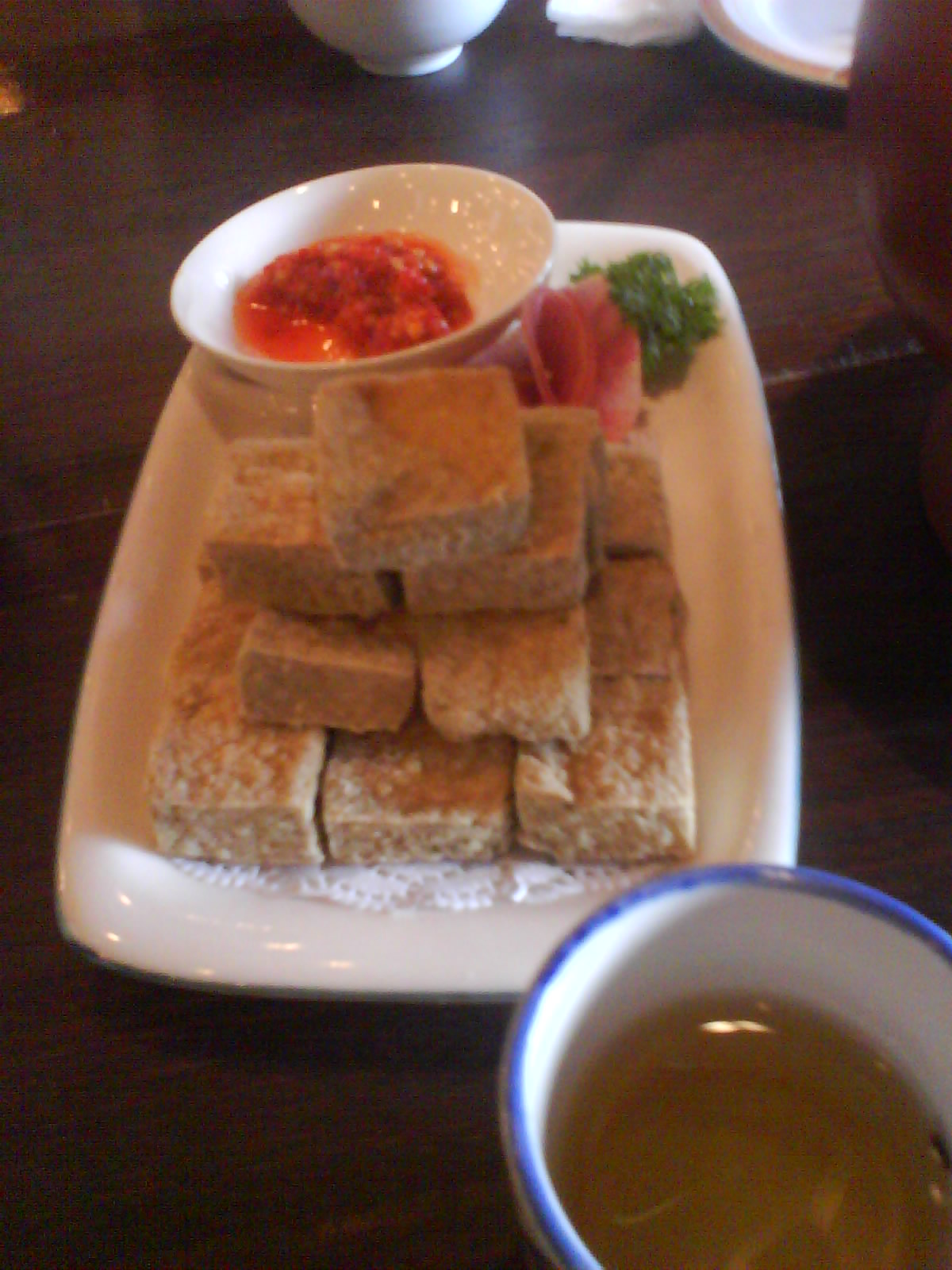
Stinky tofu in Beijing

Stinky tofu can be eaten cold, steamed, stewed, or, most commonly, deep-fried, and it is often accompanied by chili sauce or soy sauce. The color varies from the golden, fried Zhejiang-style to the black, typical of Hunan-style stinky tofu.

From a distance, the odor of stinky tofu is said to resemble that of rotten garbage or smelly feet. Some people have compared it to the taste of blue cheese / limburger cheese, while others have compared it to rotten meat. It is said that the more it smells, the better its flavor.

== History ==
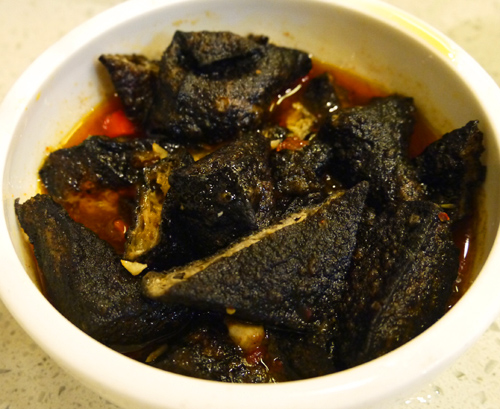
Blackened, Hunan-style stinky tofu

According to a Chinese legend, a scholar named Wang Zhihe (王致和) hailing from Huang Shan in Anhui Province invented stinky tofu during the Qing dynasty. After failing the imperial examination, Wang stayed in Beijing and relied on selling tofu to make a living. One day, having a huge quantity of unsold tofu on his hands, he cut the tofu into small cubes and put them into an earthen jar. In a legend, Wang Zhihe also wrote a poem titled "Stinky Tofu, National Fragrance."

The stinky tofu that Wang Zhihe invented gained popularity and was later served at the imperial Qing Dynasty palace. The dish has now become extremely popular in Taiwan.

== Chemical analysis ==
A 2012 chemical analysis found 39 volatile organic compounds that contributed to the unique smell and taste of fermented stinky tofu. The main volatile compound was indole, which has an intense fecal odor, followed by dimethyl trisulfide, phenol, dimethyl disulfide and dimethyl tetrasulfide.

== Health and odor issues ==
In China, there have been reported cases of food scandals where stinky tofu is made with dead snails, fecal matter and rancid meat for odour enhancement. People who have consumed it reportedly became ill and required hospitalization.

In the town of Pingyao, China, authorities have taken strict enforcement actions against those who sell and consume stinky tofu, due to multiple complaints from tourists and negative traits associated with stinky tofu caused by the unpleasant odour of stinky tofu, as well as possible food poisoning caused by the consumption of ill-prepared stinky tofu.

== Around the world ==
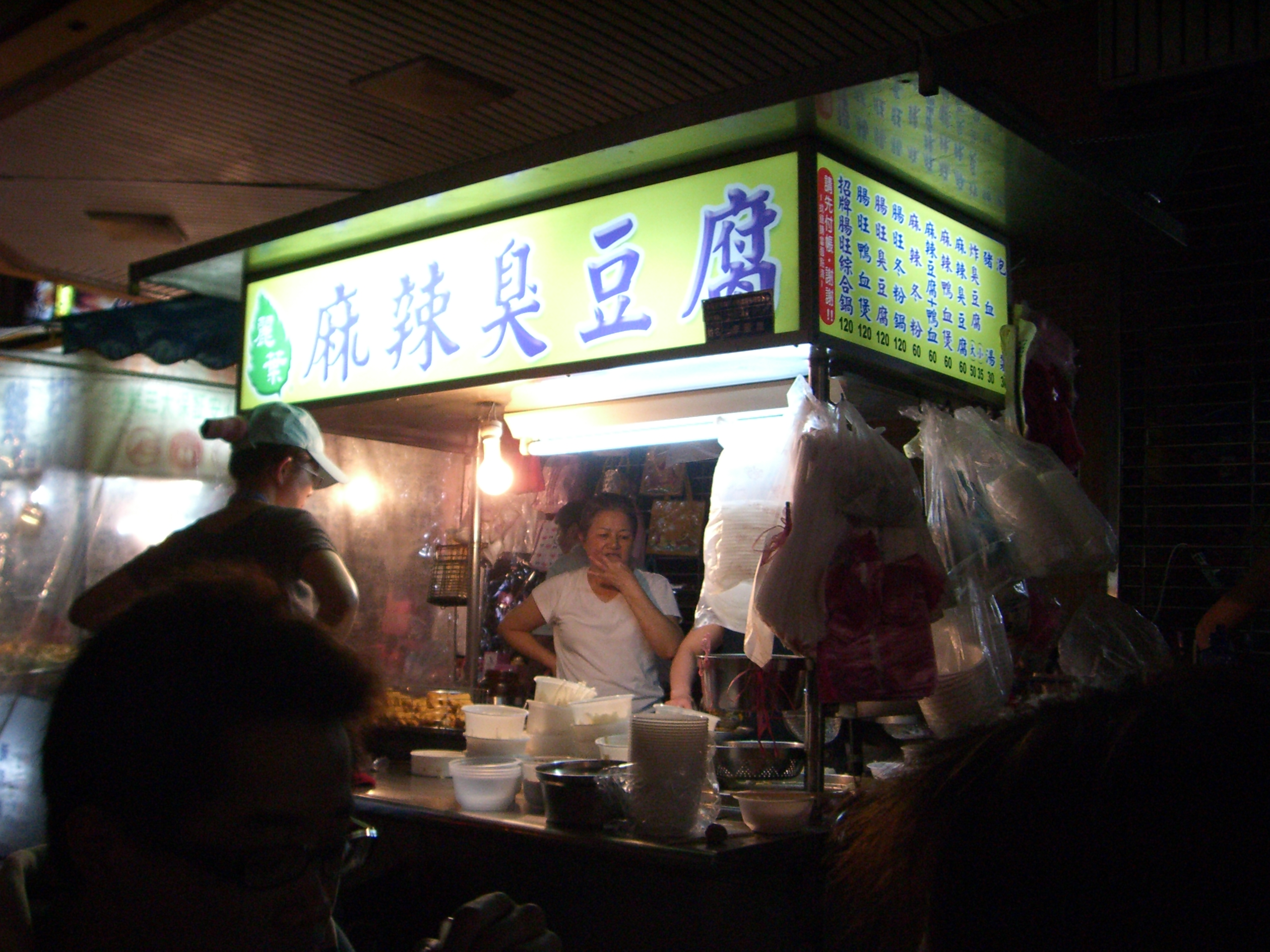
A stinky tofu stall in Keelung, Taiwan

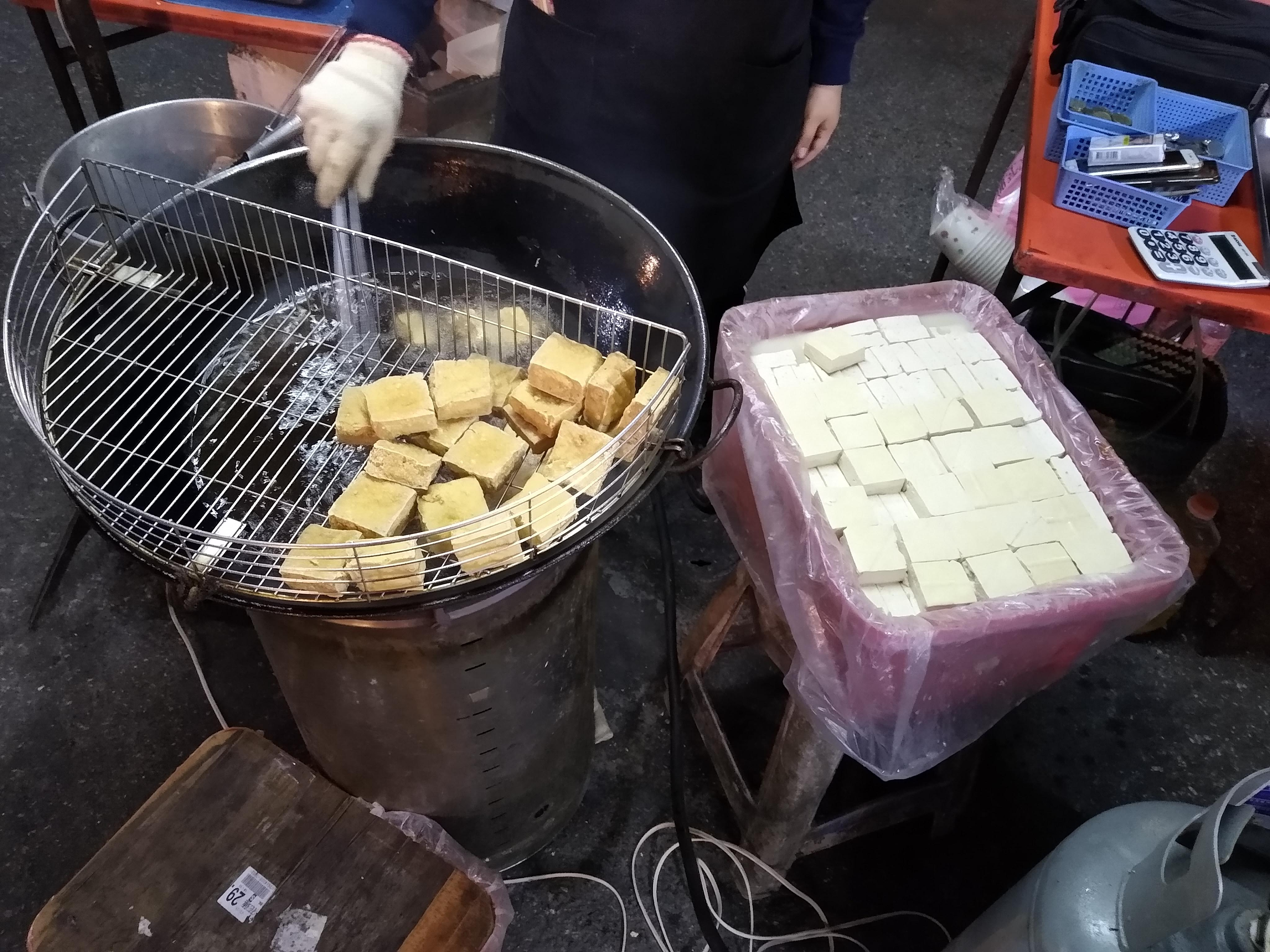
A vendor preparing stinking tofu at Xincheng Night Market, Hualien

=== China ===
Stinky tofu is made and consumed in different ways in various areas of China. For example, the types of dried stinky tofu made in Changsha and Shaoxing are made using different methods, and the resulting flavors are very different. Huo Gong Dian (a stinky tofu shop in Changsha) makes the tofu with yellow soybeans marinated in seasoning. The stinky tofu sold in Tianjin is made mostly in the Nanjing style, with a mild aroma. In Shanghai, stinky tofu is fried and sold on the street, typically served with a spicy or sweet sauce much like the Shaoxing variety. It is also served as a condiment to congee, often as a part of a regular breakfast meal. In Chongqing, stinky tofu on the street is usually fried and dipped in a mixture of, typically, coriander (cilantro) leaves, scallions, chili powder, Sichuan pepper and oil. Stinky tofu is also sometimes dipped in Sichuan spicy hot pot. In Beijing, there is a form that is sold in jar as a curd.

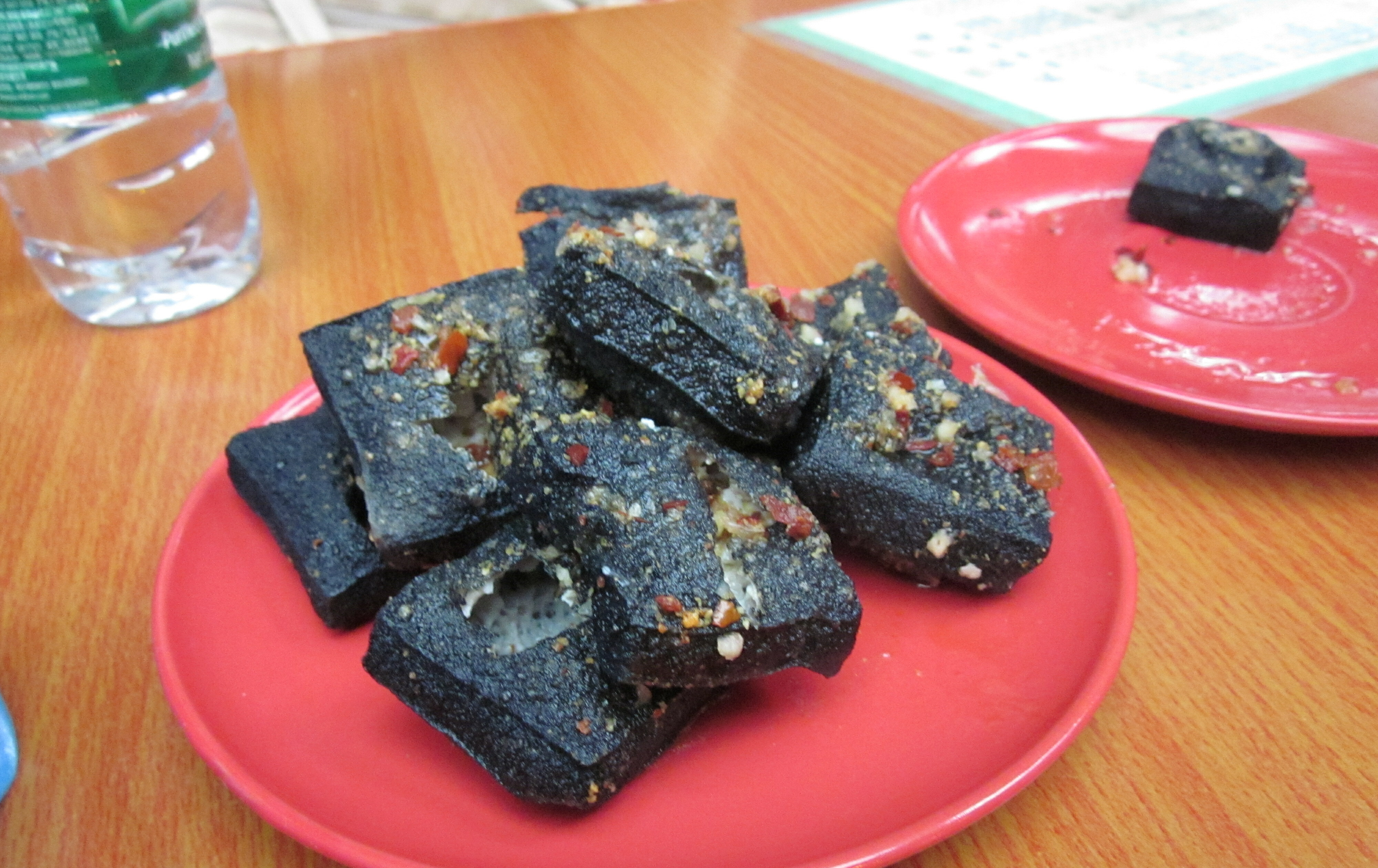
Changsha-style stinky tofu

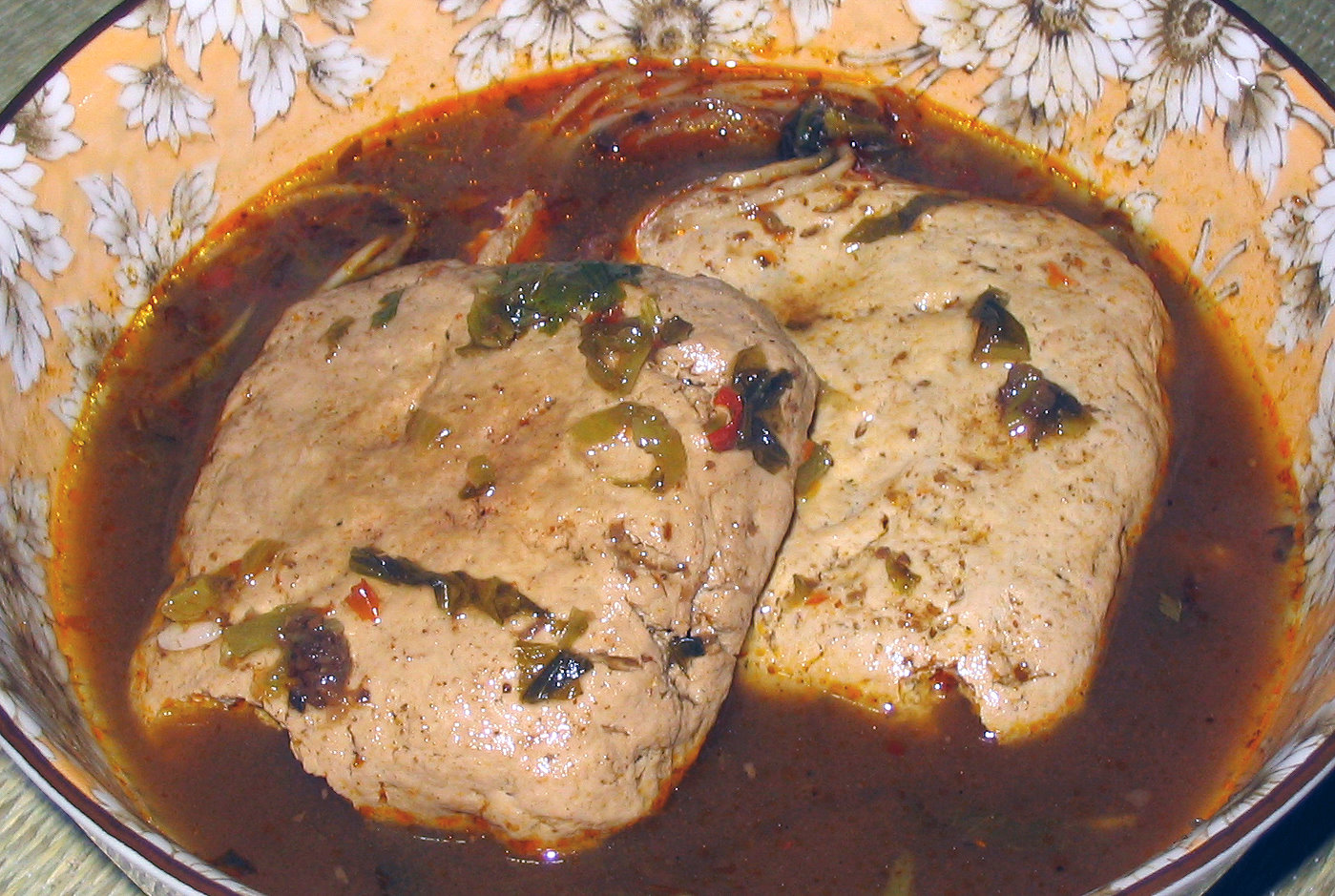
Sichuan-style (málà chòu dòufu) numbing spicy stinky tofu

==== Hong Kong ====
In Hong Kong, stinky tofu is a street food. It is deep-fried fresh at hawkers' stalls and at dai pai dongs and sold by the bag. Stinky tofu in Hong Kong is typically served deep-fried and eaten with hoisin sauce.

==== Anhui ====
In Anhui, the perceived deliciousness of stinky tofu depends mainly on its spiciness: the spicier it is, the more it suits the local favor. Chinese legend says that stinky tofu was invented by a man from Anhui province, and indeed it is common to attribute the creation of tofu dishes in general to Anhui cuisine, as Anhui is seen as the birthplace of tofu.

==== Changsha, Hunan ====
Stinky tofu is a symbol of Changsha street snack, also called chou ganzi (smelly jerky) by local people. Changsha stinky tofu is famous for its spicy flavor. Different than Sichuan stinky tofu, Changsha-style has black crackling. Changsha stinky tofu is made from brine composed of winter bamboo shoots, koji, and shiitake mushrooms. After the surface grows white hair-like filaments, and once it turns grey, the stinky tofu is ready to be fried. Chopped mustard, chili, and shallot are regular toppings on Changsha stinky tofu. Along with Xiangtan lotus seeds and Yongfeng chili sauce, Changsha stinky tofu is known as one of "Hunan Sanbao" or one of Hunan's three treasures.

==== Nanjing, Jiangsu ====
There is one famous kind of stinky tofu in Nanjing, called "Gaochun stinky tofu". It has different kinds of brine than Changsha style stinky tofu. The brine needs to be made of rotten pickles and its stinky smell will be very natural. Similar to Changsha-style stinky tofu, it also has black crackling.

==== Sichuan ====
In Sichuan, stinky tofu is often flavored with mala, a spicy and numbing seasoning made from chilli and Sichuan peppercorns. Sichuan-style stinky tofu does not need to be deep-fried in the oil, so it does not have black cracklings. It needs to be stir-fried and boiled with different kinds of spices.

===== Stewed stinky tofu =====
Stewed stinky tofu is served in a thick soup. A Sichuan mala base is often used, but can vary. The spicy broth of a mala base is said to be able to mask the smell and taste of the tofu.

=== Taiwan ===
In Taiwan, stinky tofu is commonly found at stalls in night markets. Taiwanese stinky tofu is cooked with many methods including frying, steaming, cooking in soup, and barbecuing, but is most commonly found in its fried form. The Shenkeng Old Street in New Taipei's Shenkeng District is known for having an entire boulevard dedicated to eateries serving Taiwanese varieties of stinky tofu.

==== Fried stinky tofu ====
Fried stinky tofu is the most common variety found in Taiwanese night markets and is considered to be less pungent than other varieties. It is almost always served with pickled cabbage and garlic sauce.

==== Steamed stinky tofu ====
Steamed stinky tofu in Taiwan is considered to be the most pungent variety of stinky tofu available. It is typically served with pickled cabbage, chili sauce, and garlic sauce.

==== Barbecued stinky tofu ====
Barbecued stinky tofu is a popular stinky tofu variety believed to have originated in Taipei's Shenkeng District, and is served in many of Taiwan's night markets. It is often described as have a nutty, smooth center and a spongy outer skin. Cubes of stinky tofu are speared on a bamboo skewer are roasted over charcoal with roasted meat sauce. Because of the huge amount of seasonings, the unpleasant odor of barbecued stinky tofu is comparatively weaker. Therefore, barbecued stinky tofu is interesting for people trying stinky tofu for the first time.

=== United States ===
Stinky tofu can also be found in specialty restaurants in some parts of the United States (with preparation methods altered where needed to comply with U.S. food safety laws). Besides restaurants, some grocery stores are starting to carry packaged ones to make easily at home.

== See also ==
- Fermented bean curd
- List of fermented soy products
- List of tofu dishes
- Specialty foods
