= Specialty food =

High-value food made in small quantities

A specialty food is a food that is typically considered as a "unique and high-value food item made in small quantities from high-quality ingredients". Consumers typically pay higher prices for specialty foods, and may perceive them as having various benefits compared to non-specialty foods.

Compared to staple foods, specialty foods may have higher prices due to more expensive ingredients and labor. Some food stores specialize in or predominantly purvey specialty foods. Several organizations exist that promote specialty foods and its purveyors.

== Definition ==
There is no standard definition for "specialty food".

== Specialty foods ==
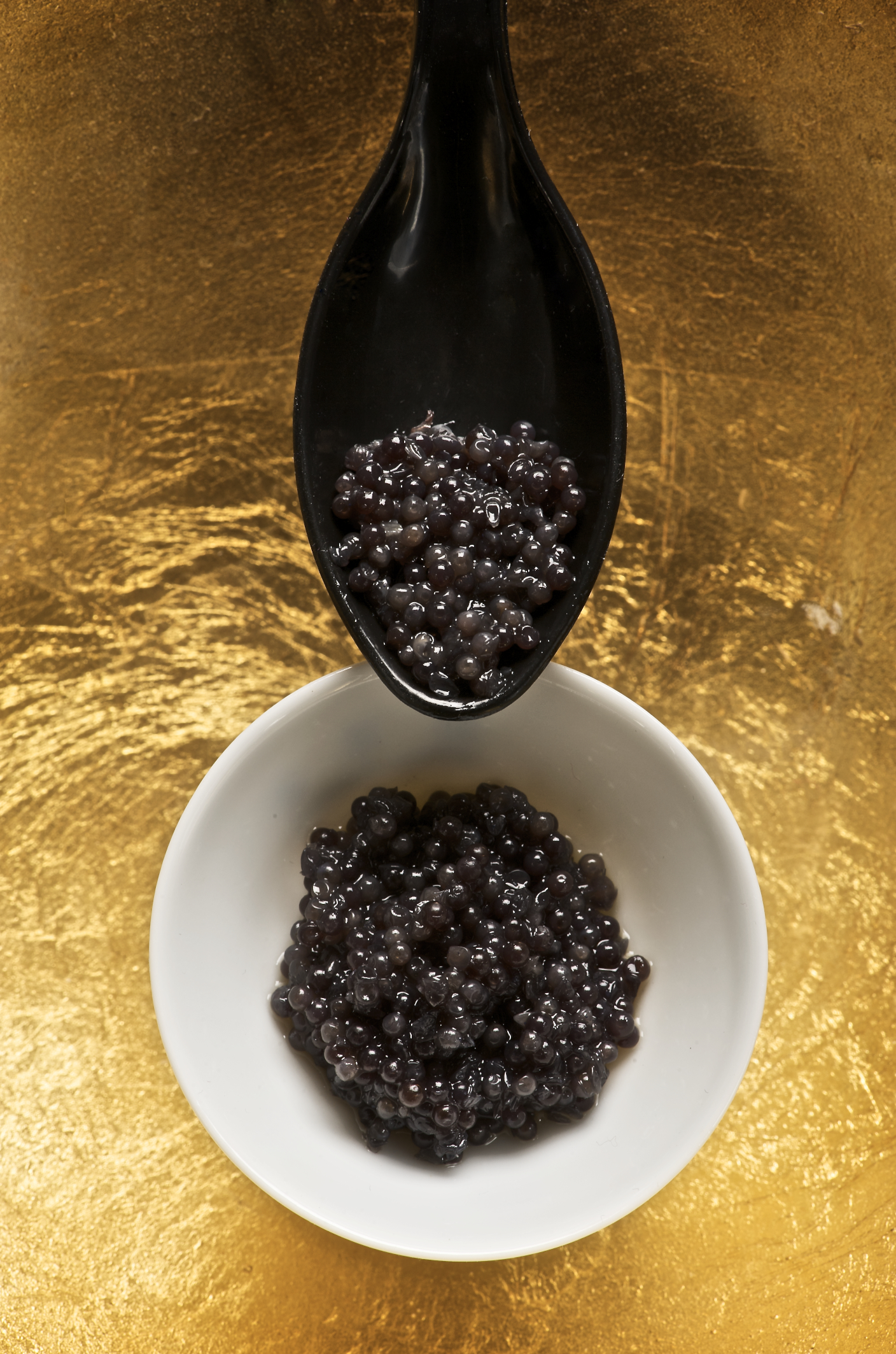
Caviar has been described as a specialty food.

Foods that have been described as specialty foods include:

- Alici from the Gulf of Trieste near Barcola
- Artisanal foods
- Caviar
- Cheese and artisan cheese
- Craft beer
- Specialty coffee, sometimes referred to as artisanal coffee
- High-quality chocolate
- Foie gras
- Iberico, Serrano, and other artisanal dry-cured ham
- Morels, chanterelles, matsutake and other rare mushrooms
- Mostarda
- Gourmet pet foods
- Edible seaweed
- Stinky tofu (Chinese: chòu dòufu) has been described as a local specialty food in the Old City of Shanghai.
- Truffles
- Truffle oil
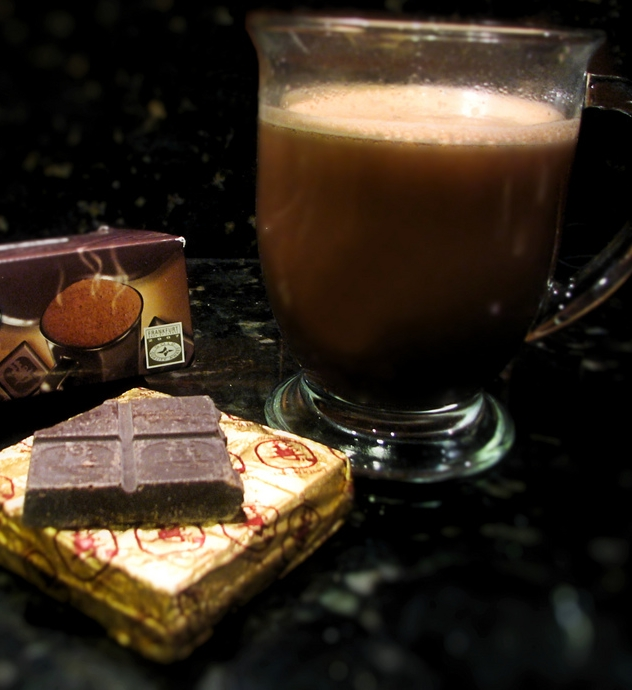
Bean-to-bar chocolate, used here to prepare hot chocolate

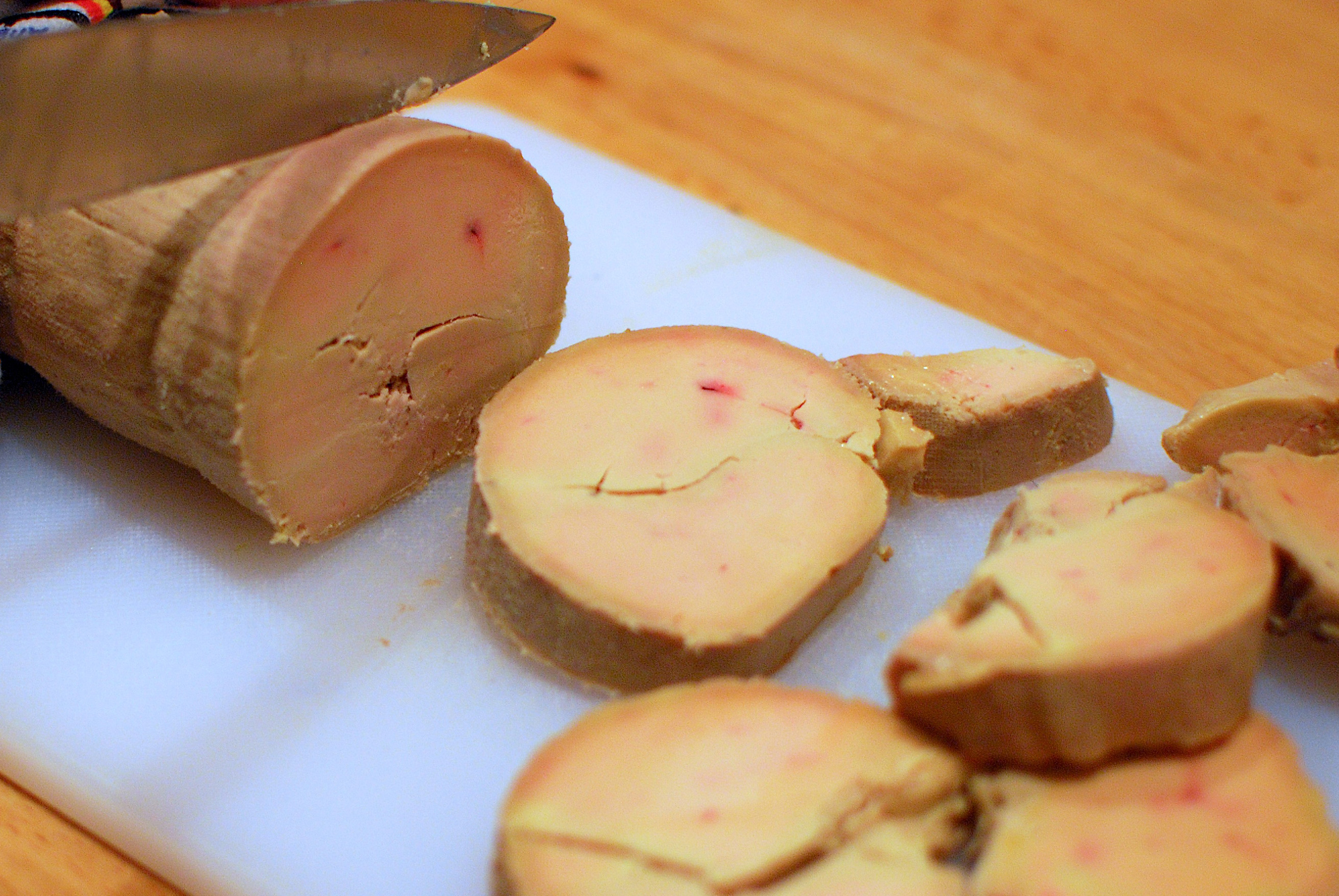
Foie gras being sliced

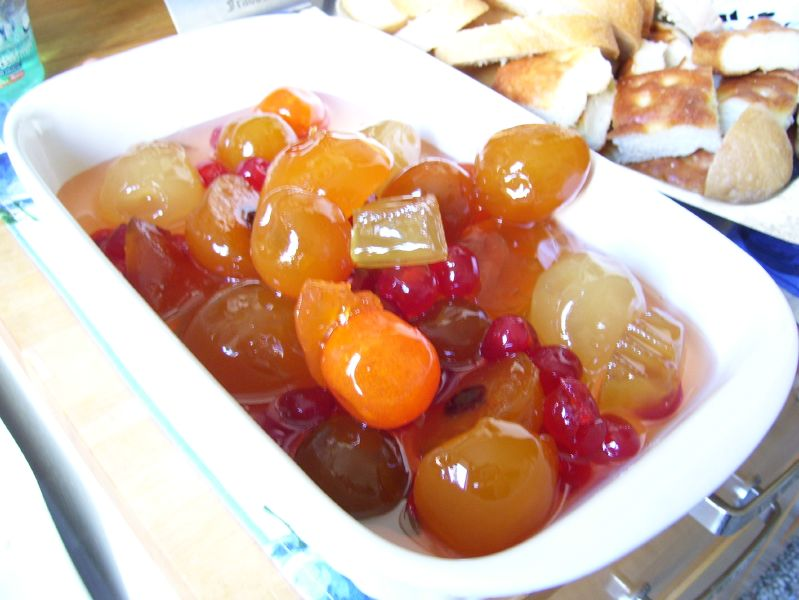
Mostarda di Cremona

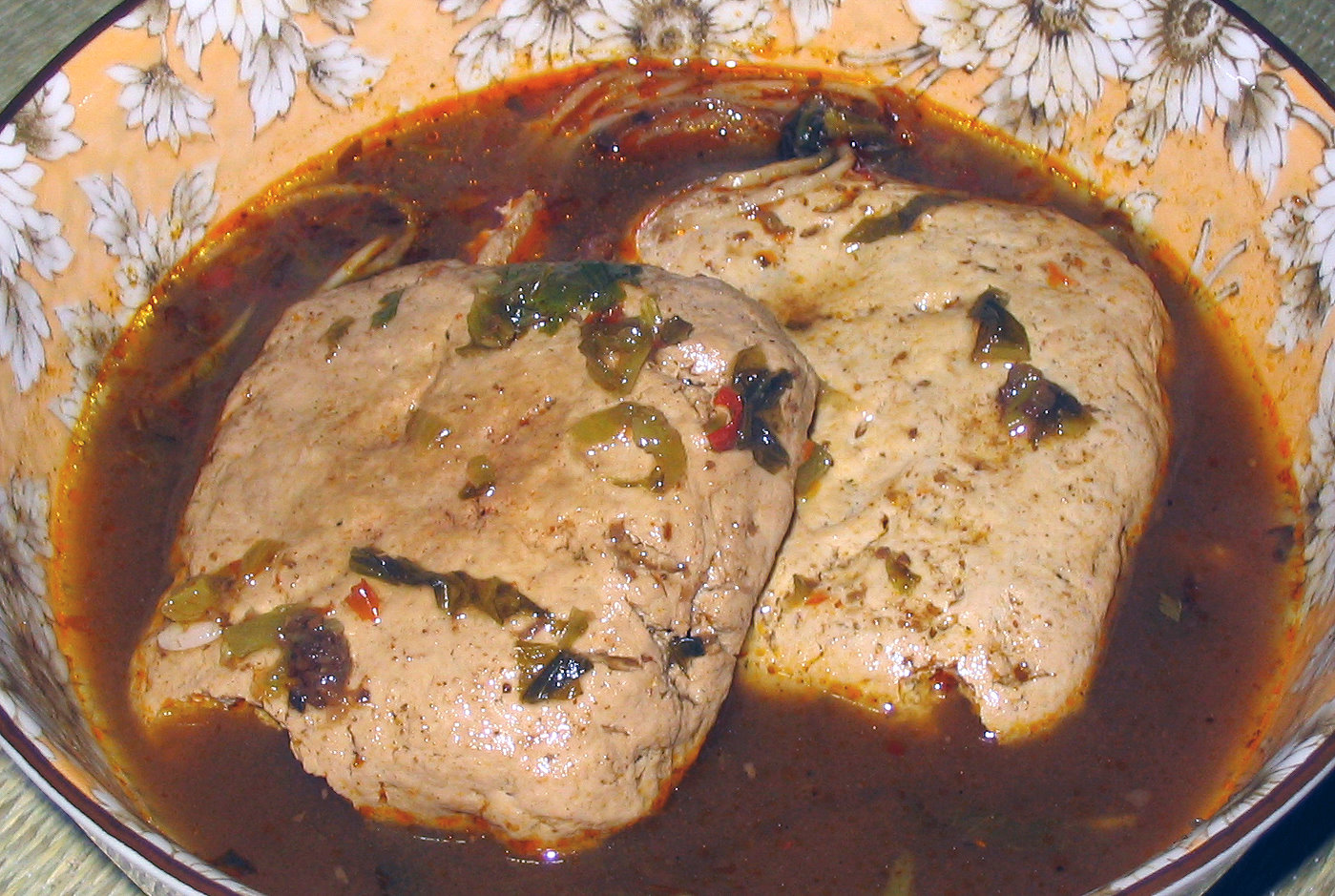
Stinky tofu

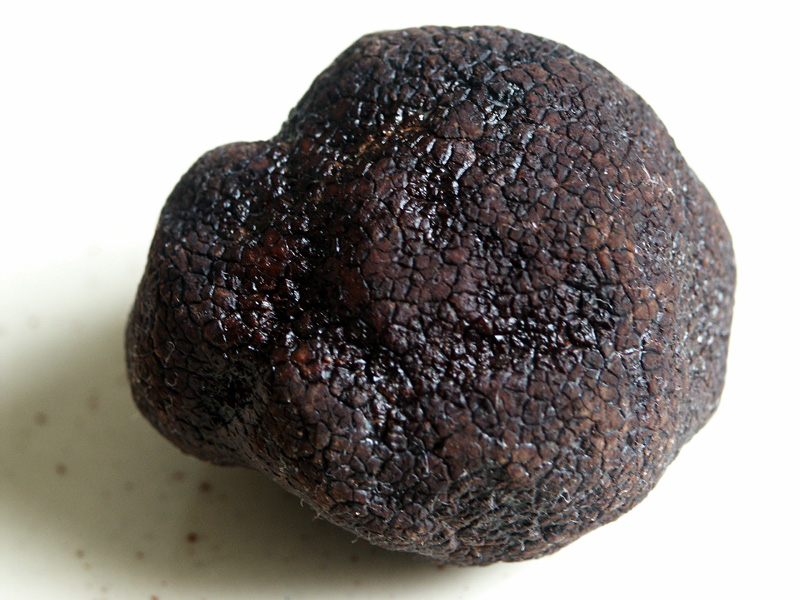
A black Périgord truffle

Some specialty foods may be ethnic specialties.

Foods that have been described as specialty foods as per not precisely corresponding to other food categories include:

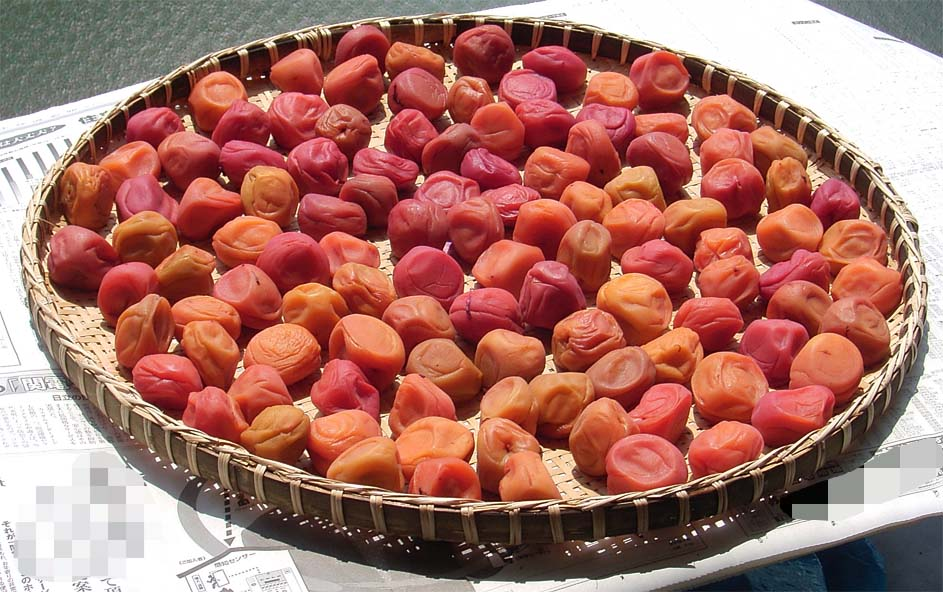
Umeboshi being dried in the sun

- Kimchi
- Olives
- Royal jelly, bee pollen and propolis
- Sauerkraut
- Sea vegetables
- Umeboshi
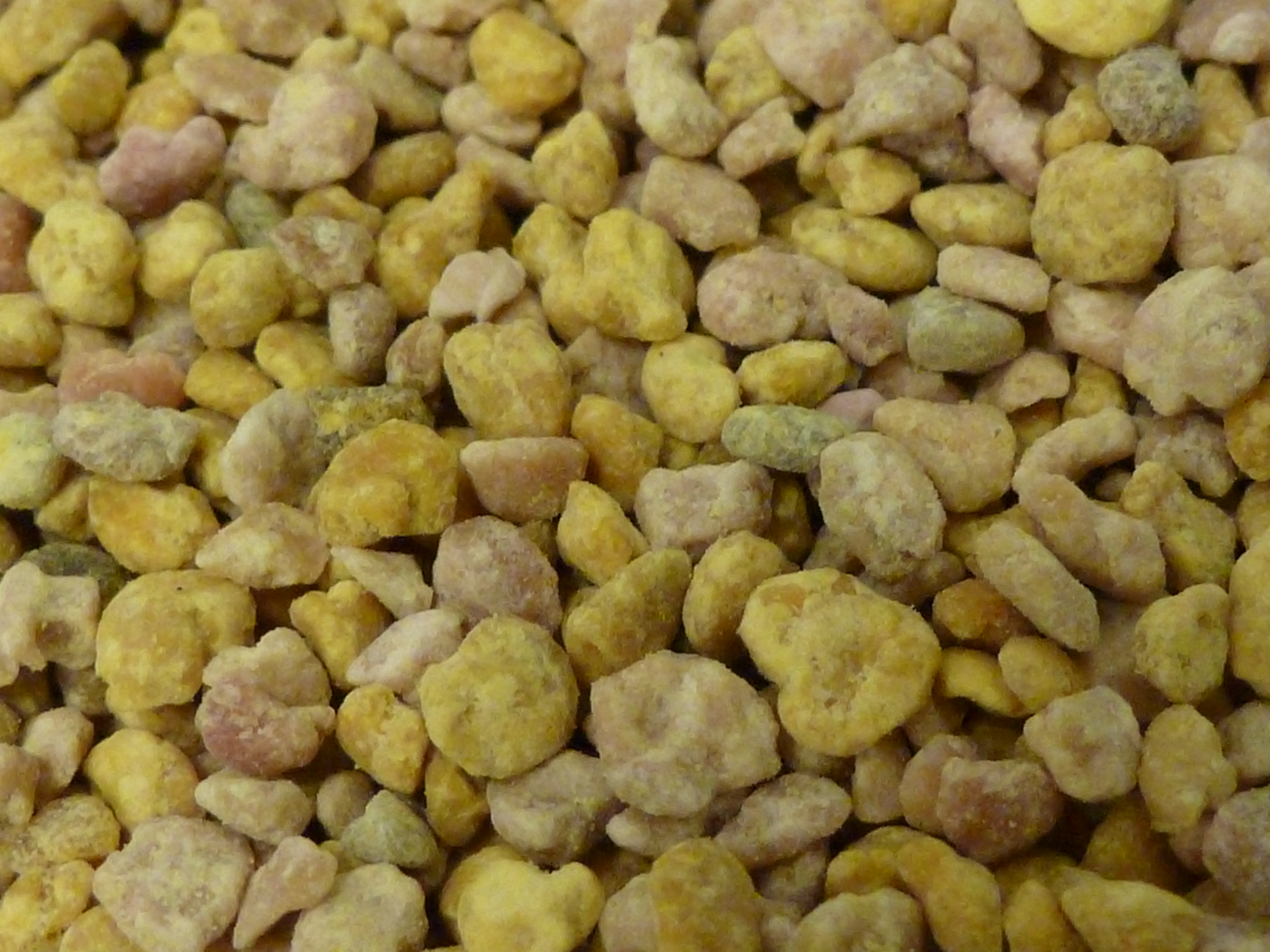
Frozen bee pollen, a human food supplement

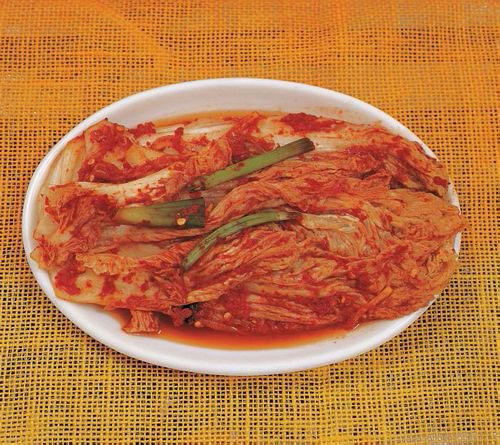
Kimchi

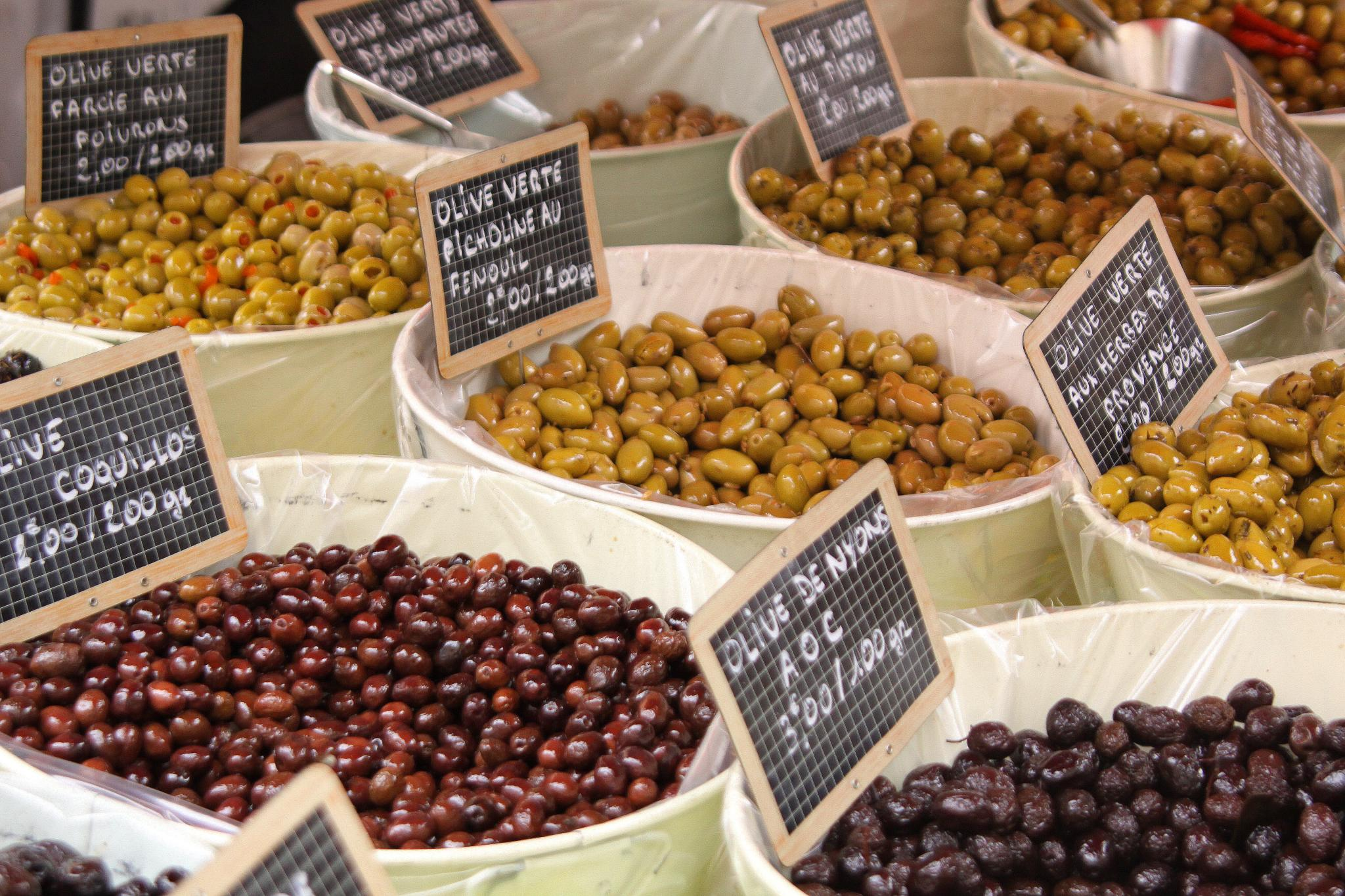
Various olives

== By country ==
=== China ===
In China, specialty foods have been described as having "important roles in the food culture..." Some Chinese recipes may be footnoted with a statement that ingredients may only be available in specialty food stores and Chinese markets.

=== United States ===
In the United States, specialty foods and their purveyors are regulated by both federal and state agencies.

The Specialty Food Association's annual "State of the Specialty Food Industry 2014" report stated that in 2013 in the U.S., specialty foods and beverages sales totaled $88.3 billion, accounted for an increase of 18.4% since 2011, and was a record high for the fourth consecutive year. The report also stated that around 80% of specialty food sales occur at the retail level, and that seven out of ten specialty food retailers reported that the word "local" had the most importance as a product claim.Global Specialty Food Ingredients Market Projected to Reach US$ 183.49 Billion by 2033 as AI-Optimized Sensory Profiles and Clean-Label Functional Additives Transform the Global Food Supply Chain

==== Bean-to-bar chocolate manufacturers ====
As of March 2015 in the United States, the number of bean-to-bar chocolate manufacturers (companies that process cocoa beans into a product in-house, rather than melting chocolate from another manufacturer) had increased to at least 60. The Fine Chocolate Industry Association (FCIA) stated that this represented "a tenfold increase in the past decade that's outpacing growth in Europe". In April 2020, the FCIA launched the campaign website Make Mine Fine in order to support small scale farmers who rely on cocoa for their livelihoods in tropical countries and highlight the work of chocolate manufacturers who buy their beans.

==== California ====
In 2012 in the United States, the specialty foods market sector was experiencing significant growth, with its annual growth rate at 8–10%. In 2010, specialty foods comprised 13.1% of total retail food sales and totaled $55.9 billion in sales.

In 2010 in Oakland, California, it was reported that abandoned industrial spaces previously occupied by large food producers were being inhabited by small specialty food companies.

In 1998, the U.S. state of California had the second-highest amount of specialty and gourmet foods of all U.S. states. This has been attributed as possible due a diverse variety of unique fruits and vegetables that can be grown in Southern California. Another possibility for the high quantity and diversity of specialty foods in California is that food innovations often occur in the state, as has occurred in other sectors such as health food and organic produce.

In 1991, the Los Angeles Times reported that city officials in Monterey Park, Los Angeles County, California, suspected that significant numbers of non-residents were visiting the city to shop at Asian markets there to obtain specialty foods.

==== Vermont ====
In terms of food-place association perceptions, Vermont has been described as being associated with "homemade-style specialty items", along with maple syrup.

== Companies and stores ==
Some companies, grocery stores and food stores specialize in or predominantly purvey specialty foods. Some of these companies include:

- Asian markets and supermarkets
- Boulder Specialty Brands Inc.
- Centennial Specialty Foods Corp., Centennial, Colorado
- Innovative Food Holdings
- Organic Food Brokers, Boulder, Colorado
- Whole Foods Market

== Organizations ==
=== United States ===
==== National Association for the Specialty Food Trade ====
Also known as the Specialty Food Association, it is a non-profit trade association founded in 1952 in New York that has over 3,000 members. The organization also oversees its Specialty Food Foundation, a foundation that "works to reduce hunger and increase food recovery efforts via grantmaking, education and industry events".

==== Connecticut ====
- Connecticut Food Association – has a specialty food division
- Connecticut Specialty Food Association

==== Massachusetts ====
- Massachusetts Specialty Foods Association

==== Michigan ====
- Traverse Bay Specialty Foods

==== New York ====
In New York's Finger Lakes region, the Worker Ownership Resource Center established the Specialty Food Network. The network was established to "help clients start or expand small food businesses" and to promote the businesses and products of its members. Establishment of the network was enabled in part with a grant from the John Merck Fund. In 1998, the network had 46 members.

==== South Carolina ====
- South Carolina Specialty Food Association

==== Vermont ====
- Vermont Specialty Food Association

== See also ==
- Artisan
- Delicacy
- Delicatessen
- Foodie
- Gluten-free diet
- Gourmet
- Health food store
- Jewish deli
- List of bean-to-bar chocolate manufacturers
- National dish
- Natural foods
- Third wave of coffee
- Traditional food
- Whole food

== Bibliography ==
- Zhao, Y. (2012). Specialty Foods: Processing Technology, Quality, and Safety. Science & food technology. Taylor & Francis. ISBN 978-1-4398-5423-5.
- Bowden, J. (2007). The 150 Healthiest Foods on Earth: The Surprising, Unbiased Truth about What You Should Eat and Why. Fair Winds Press. pp. 221–240. ISBN 978-1-61673-416-9.
