= Specialty Food Association =

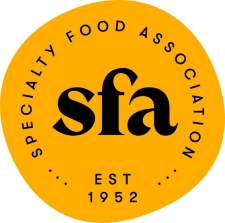
- Abbreviation: SFA
- Formation: 1952; 74 years ago
- Founded at: New York City
- Type: Not-for-profit
- President: Bill Lynch
- Formerly called: National Association for the Specialty Food Trade

The Specialty Food Association, Inc. (SFA) is membership-based trade association in the United States representing 3,000+ member companies. The SFA was established in 1952 to foster trade, commerce and interest in the specialty food industry in the U.S., worth $148 billion as of May 2020.

The Association is a not-for-profit organization whose members are specialty food artisans, purveyors, importers and entrepreneurs, as well as distributors, retailers, and others involved in the specialty food trade.

Bill Lynch was named Interim President of SFA in May 2020 and appointed President of SFA in November 2020.

== Activities ==
The Specialty Food Association is a source of industry information, educational events and in-person and online networking opportunities, including workshops, certification and training programs and events.

Among the Association's programs are the annual Winter Fancy Food Show, traditionally held in January in San Francisco, CA, at the Moscone Center and the annual Summer Fancy Food Show, traditionally held at the end of June in New York, NY at the Jacob Javits Center.

The Summer Fancy Food Show is the largest show for specialty food in North America, with 34,000 attendees and 2400 exhibitors annually. More than 50 countries will be participating in the show, with Italy as partner country for 2020.

== Award programs ==
SFA produces the annual Sofi Awards, which recognize creativity and taste across multiple food categories in the specialty food products industry. Gold, Silver, Bronze and New Product winners are announced in the spring and highlighted at both Fancy Food Shows. At each Summer show, a Product of the Year is announced. The annual Leadership Awards honor industry leaders who are active members of the SFA and who are spearheading positive environmental, community, and business practices.

The SFA's Hall of Fame for the specialty food industry's mission is to honor individuals whose accomplishments, impact, contributions, innovations, and successes within the specialty food industry deserve praise and recognition. Multiple individuals are inducted into the Hall of Fame each year. The Association’s Lifetime Achievement Awards recognize and celebrate extraordinary industry pioneers.
