= Changsha stinky tofu =

Traditional snack in Hunan, China

- Simplified: 长沙臭豆腐
- Traditional: 長沙臭豆腐
- Also translated as: Changsha-style stinky tofu

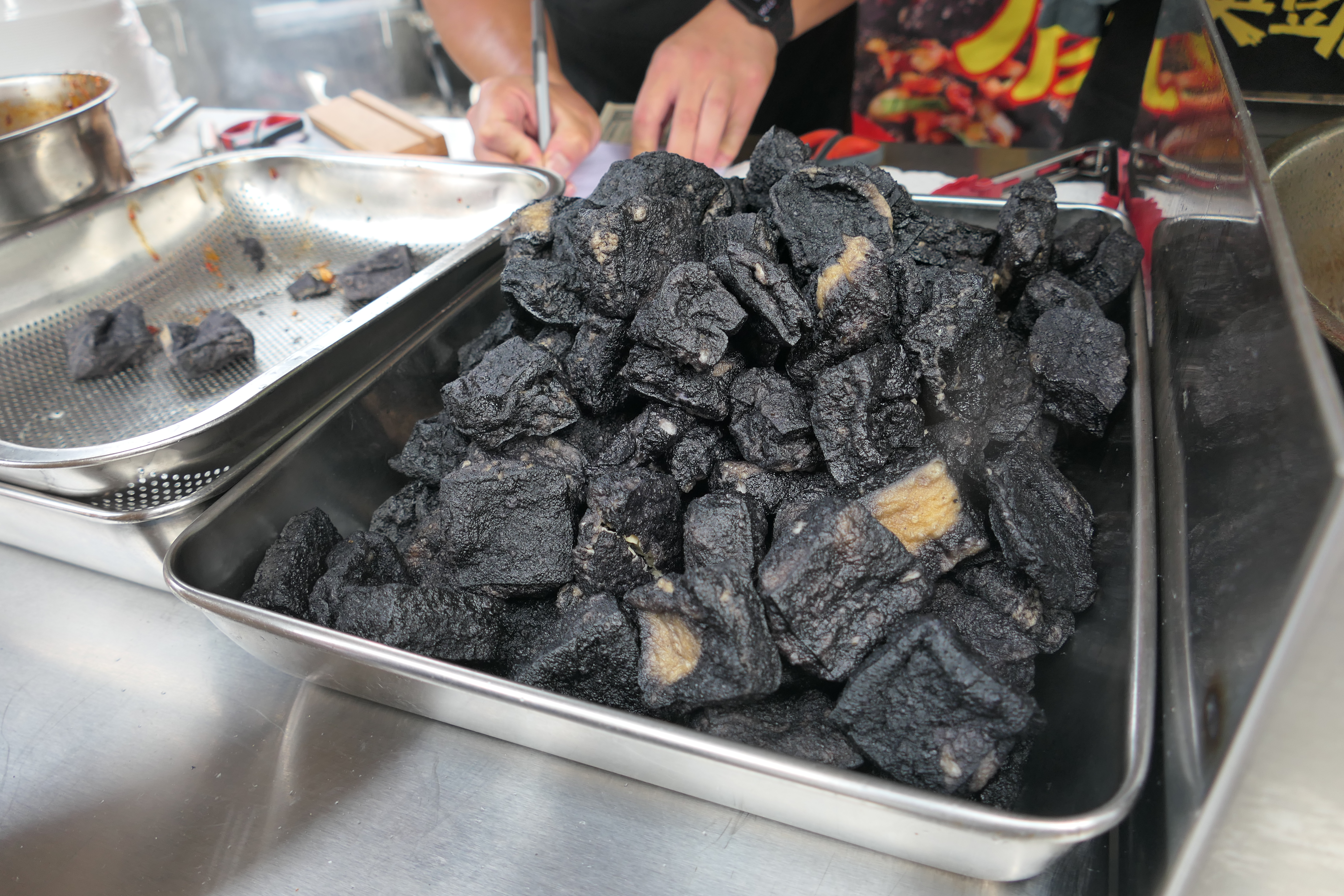
just fried

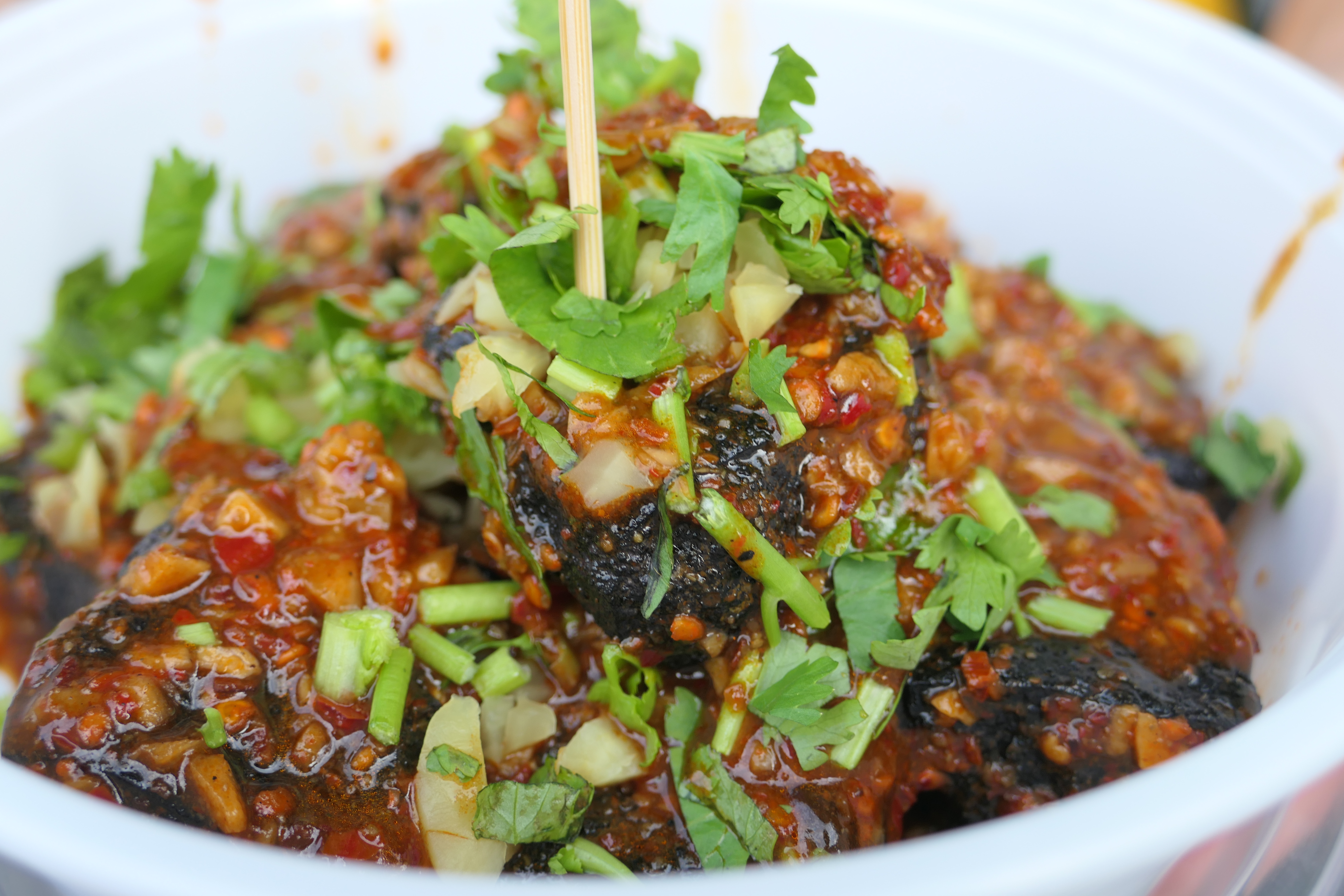
fully seasoned

Changsha stinky tofu or stinky dry food (simplified Chinese: 长沙臭豆腐; traditional Chinese: 長沙臭豆腐; lit. 'Changsha smelly bean curd'), known in Chinese as Changsha chou doufu, also translated as Changsha-style stinky tofu, is a traditional snack in Changsha, Hunan, which belongs to Hunan cuisine. It is one of the renowned stinky tofu in Southern China.

Changsha stinky tofu, along with Yongfeng chili sauce and Xiangtan lotus seeds, are referred to as the "Three Treasures of Hunan". It is the most applauded one among the different types of stinky tofu throughout China.

Changsha stinky tofu is famed for its spicy flavor, and unlike Sichuan stinky tofu, it has black crackling. The local people in Changsha call it chou ganzi (smelly jerky).

Stinky tofu is one of the traditional Chinese snacks, and has been said to have a strong odor, yet a delicious taste.

There are considerable differences in the production methods and eating methods in various places. The ingredients can include soybeans, tempeh, sodium carbonate, etc. Stinky tofu is also called chouganzi(臭干子) in the south.
