= Hunan cuisine =

Chinese cuisine from Hunan province

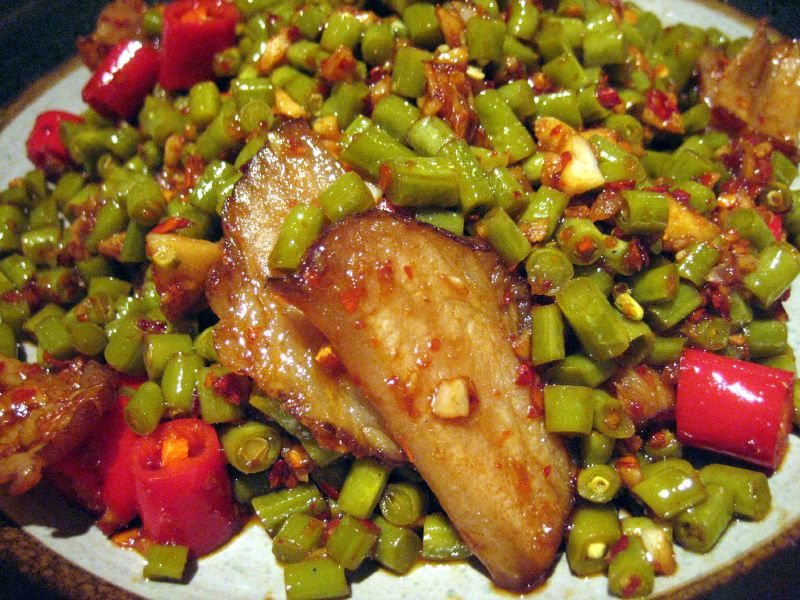
- Hunan cured ham with pickled yardlong beans
- Chinese: 湖南菜
Transcriptions
Standard Mandarin
- Hanyu Pinyin: Húnán cài
- Wade–Giles: Hu-nan ts'ai

Xiang cuisine
- Chinese: 湘菜
Transcriptions
Standard Mandarin
- Hanyu Pinyin: xiāng cài
- Wade–Giles: hsiang ts'ai

Hunan cuisine, also known as Xiang cuisine, consists of the cuisines of the Xiang River region, Dongting Lake and western Hunan Province in China. It is one of the Eight Great Traditions of Chinese cuisine and is well known for its hot and spicy flavours, fresh aroma and deep colours. Despite this, only about 20% of the cuisine uses capsicum to produce a strong spicy taste. Common cooking techniques include stewing, frying, pot-roasting, braising and smoking. Due to the high agricultural output of the region, many different ingredients are used in Hunan dishes.

== History ==
The history of the cooking skills employed in Hunan cuisine dates back to the 17th century. The first mention of chili peppers in local gazettes in the province date to 1684, the 21st year of the Kangxi Emperor. During the course of its history, Hunan cuisine assimilated a variety of local forms, eventually evolving into its own style. Some well-known dishes include fried chicken with Sichuan spicy sauce (麻辣鸡丁; 麻辣雞丁; málà jīdīng) and smoked pork with dried long green beans (干豆角蒸腊肉; 乾豆角蒸臘肉; gāndòujiǎo zhēng làròu).

Hunan cuisine consists of three primary styles:

- Xiang River style: Originating from Changsha, Xiangtan and Hengyang. The dishes are quite oily with a attractive colour, and the dishes are spicy, fresh, and have a strong aroma. Dishes include stir-fry chicken with chili, braised meat with black bean sauce and Changsha stinky tofu.
- Dongting Lake style: Originating from Yueyang, Yiyang and Changde. This style is also oily but is also starchy, accompanied with spiciness and saltiness. Stewing is more common in this form of Hunan cuisine, and fish is commonly used too. Notable dishes include Dongting gold tortoise and lotus seedpods with crystal sugar.
- Western Hunan style: Originating from Zhangjiajie, Jishou and Huaihua. Preserved meats and pickled vegetables are more commonly used. The taste is influenced by the ethnic minorities in the region, which results in a sour, spicy, and salty taste. Notable dishes include braised mushrooms and Xiangxi sour meat.

== Features ==
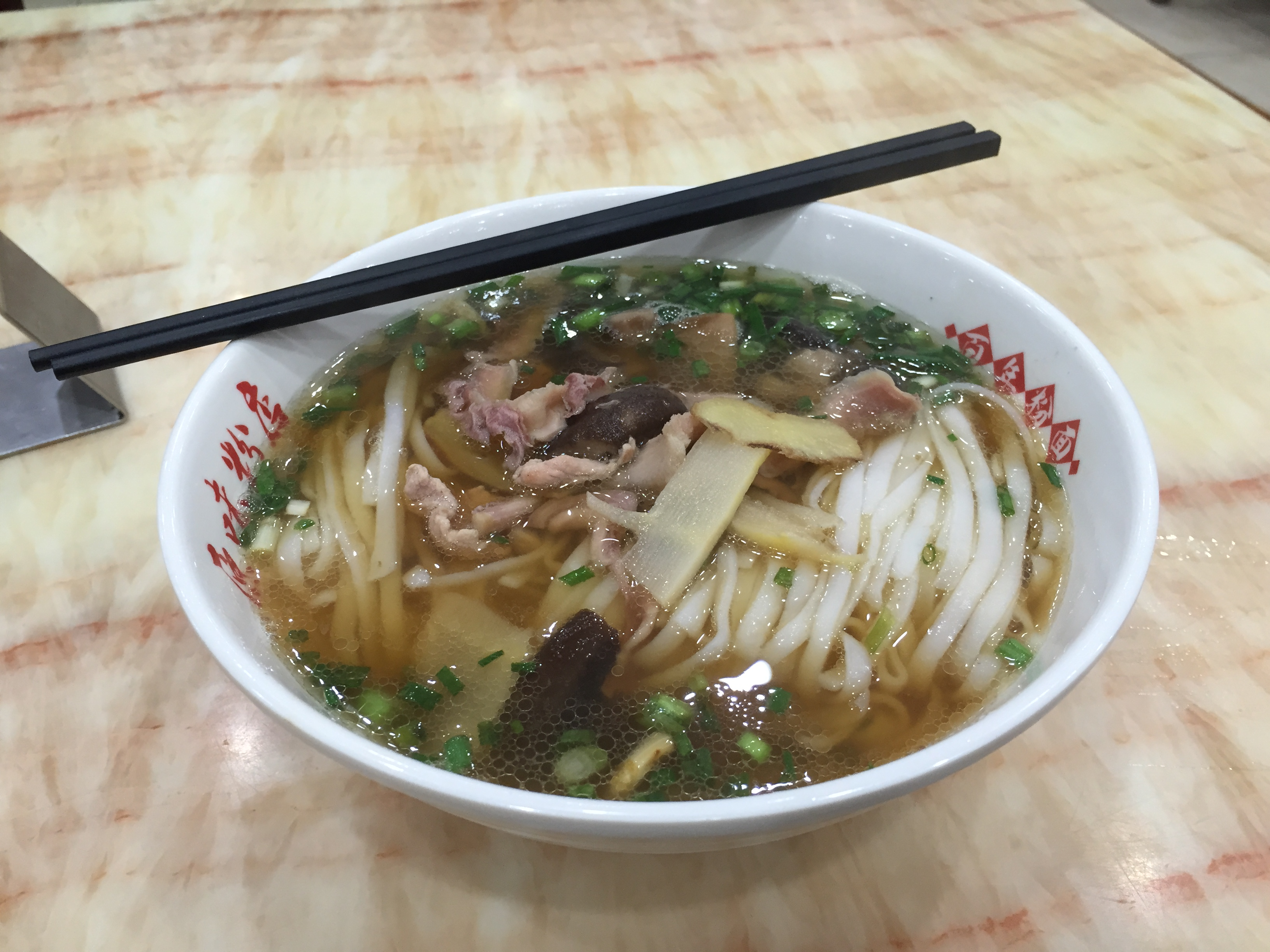
A bowl of Changsha rice noodles

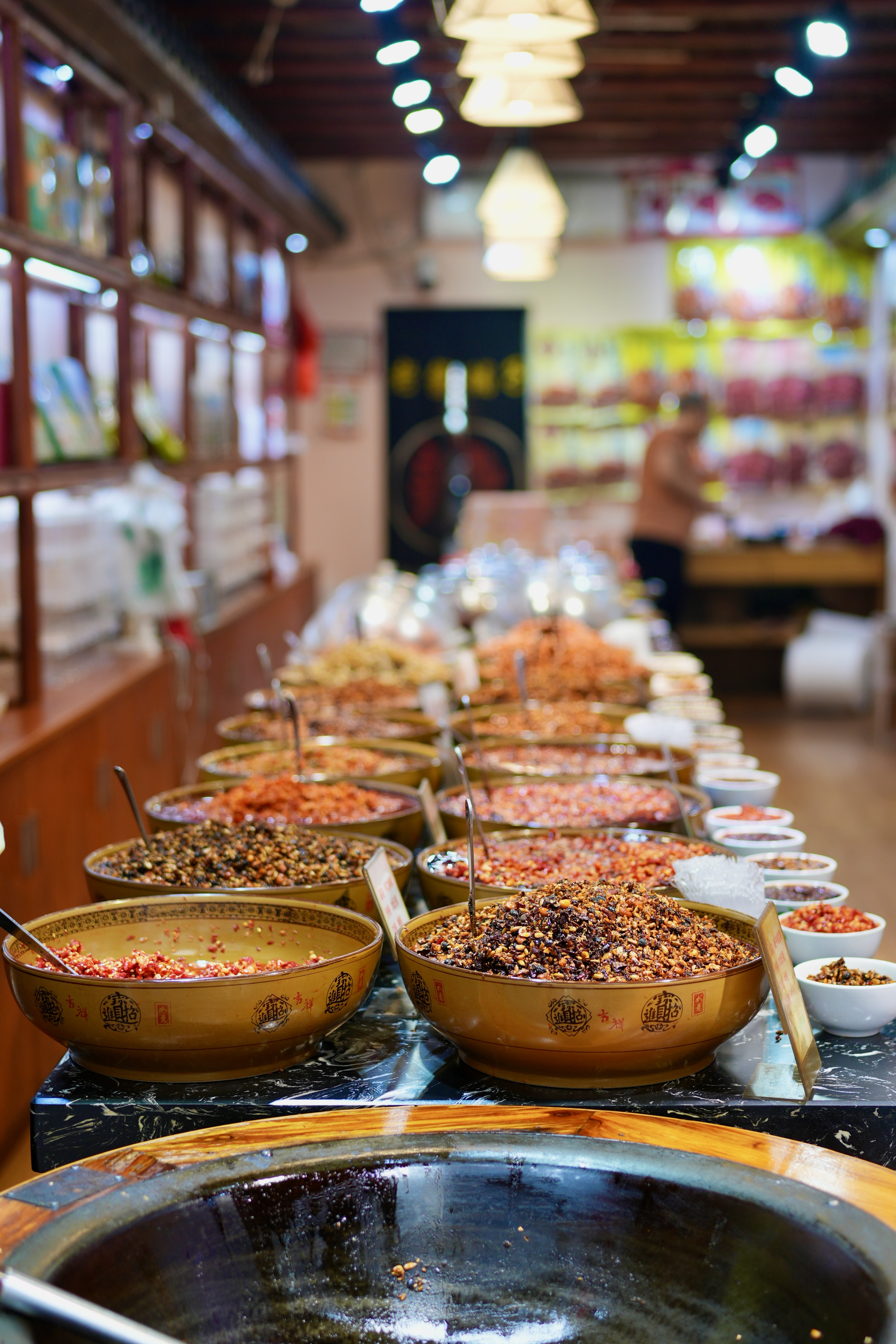
Spice shop with chili blends in Fenghuang Ancient Town, Hunan

With its liberal use of chili peppers, shallots and garlic, Hunan cuisine is known for being gan la (干辣; gān là; 'dry and spicy') or purely hot, as opposed to Sichuan cuisine, to which it is often compared. Sichuan cuisine uses its distinctive ma la (麻辣; má là; 'numbing and spicy') seasoning and other complex flavour combinations, frequently employs Sichuan pepper along with chilies which are often dried. It also utilises more dried or preserved ingredients and condiments. Hunan cuisine, on the other hand, is often spicier by pure chili content and contains a larger variety of fresh ingredients. Both Hunan and Sichuan cuisine are perhaps significantly oilier than the other cuisines in China, but Sichuan dishes are generally oilier than Hunan dishes. Another characteristic distinguishing Hunan cuisine from Sichuan cuisine is that Hunan cuisine uses smoked and cured goods in its dishes much more frequently.

Hunan cuisine's menu changes with the seasons. In a hot and humid summer, a meal will usually start with cold dishes or a platter holding a selection of cold meats with chilies for opening the pores and keeping cool in the summer. In winter, a popular choice is hot pot, thought to heat the blood in the cold months. A special hot pot called yuanyang huoguo (鸳鸯火锅; 鴛鴦火鍋; yuānyāng hǔogūo; 'Mandarin ducks hot pot') is notable for splitting the pot into a spicy and a mild side. One of the classic dishes in Hunan cuisine served in restaurants and at home is farmer pepper fried pork. It is made with several common ingredients: pork belly, green pepper, fermented black beans and other spices.

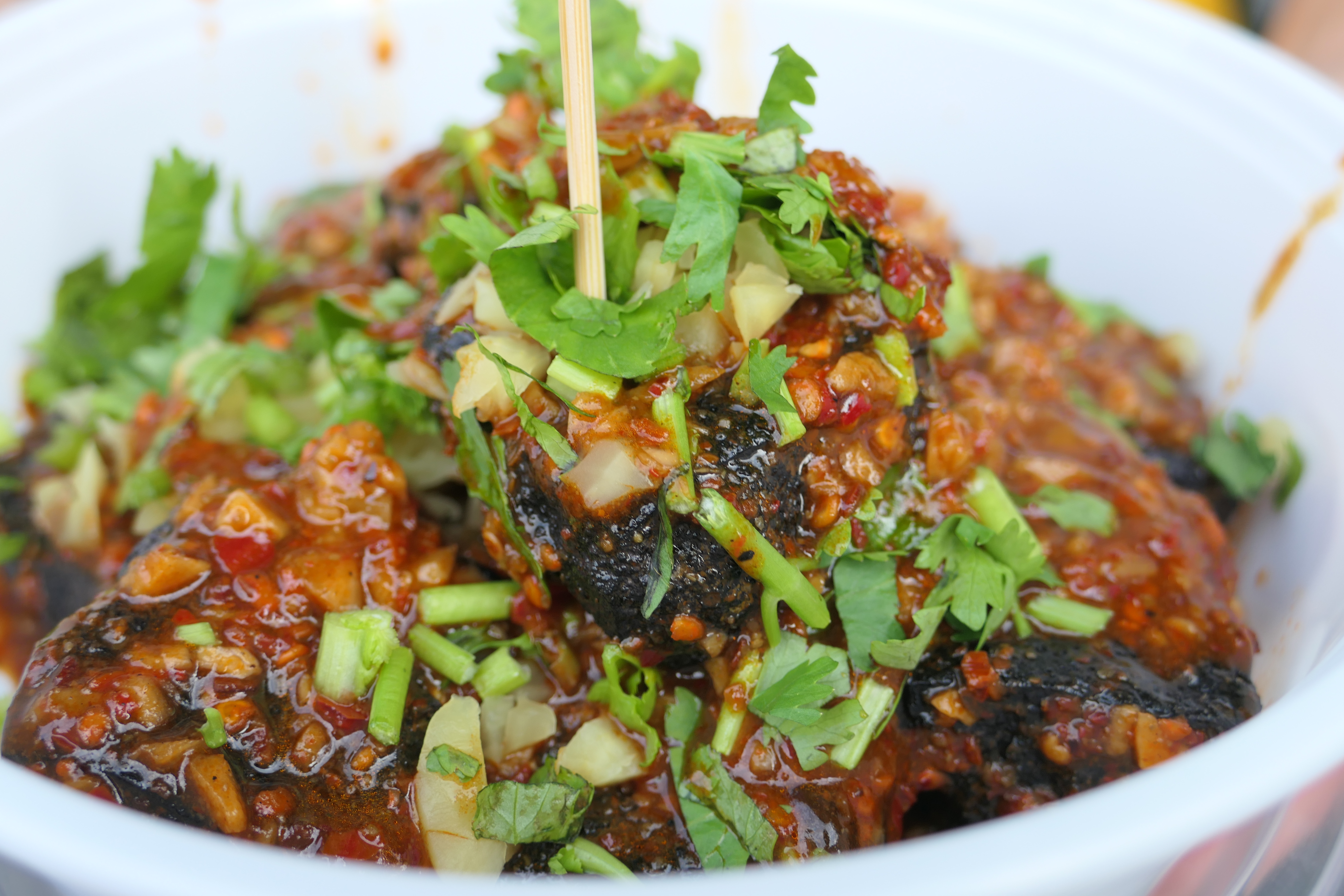
Fully seasoned

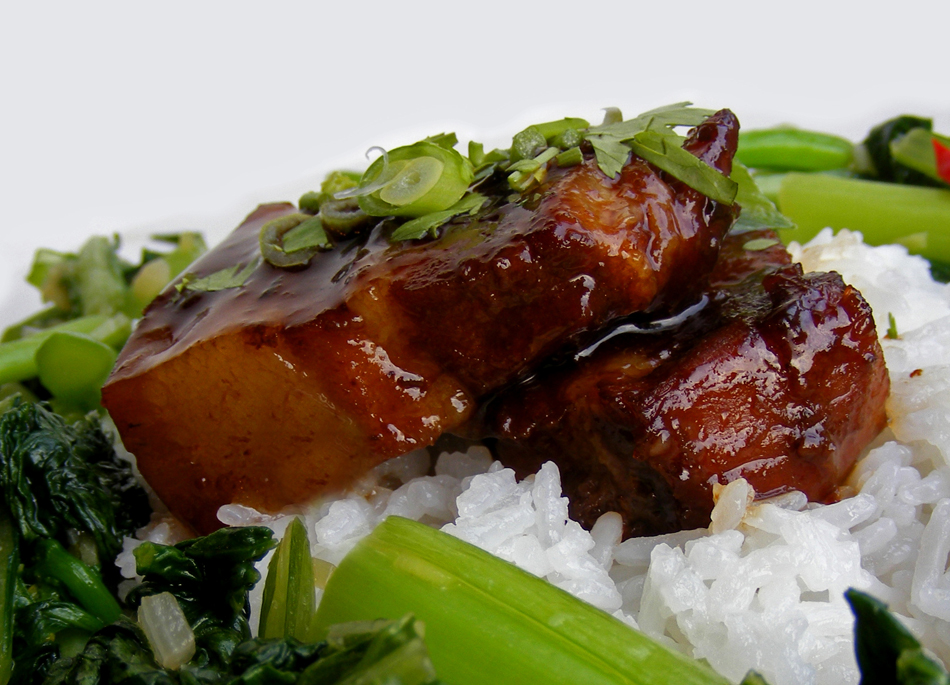
Red braised pork belly

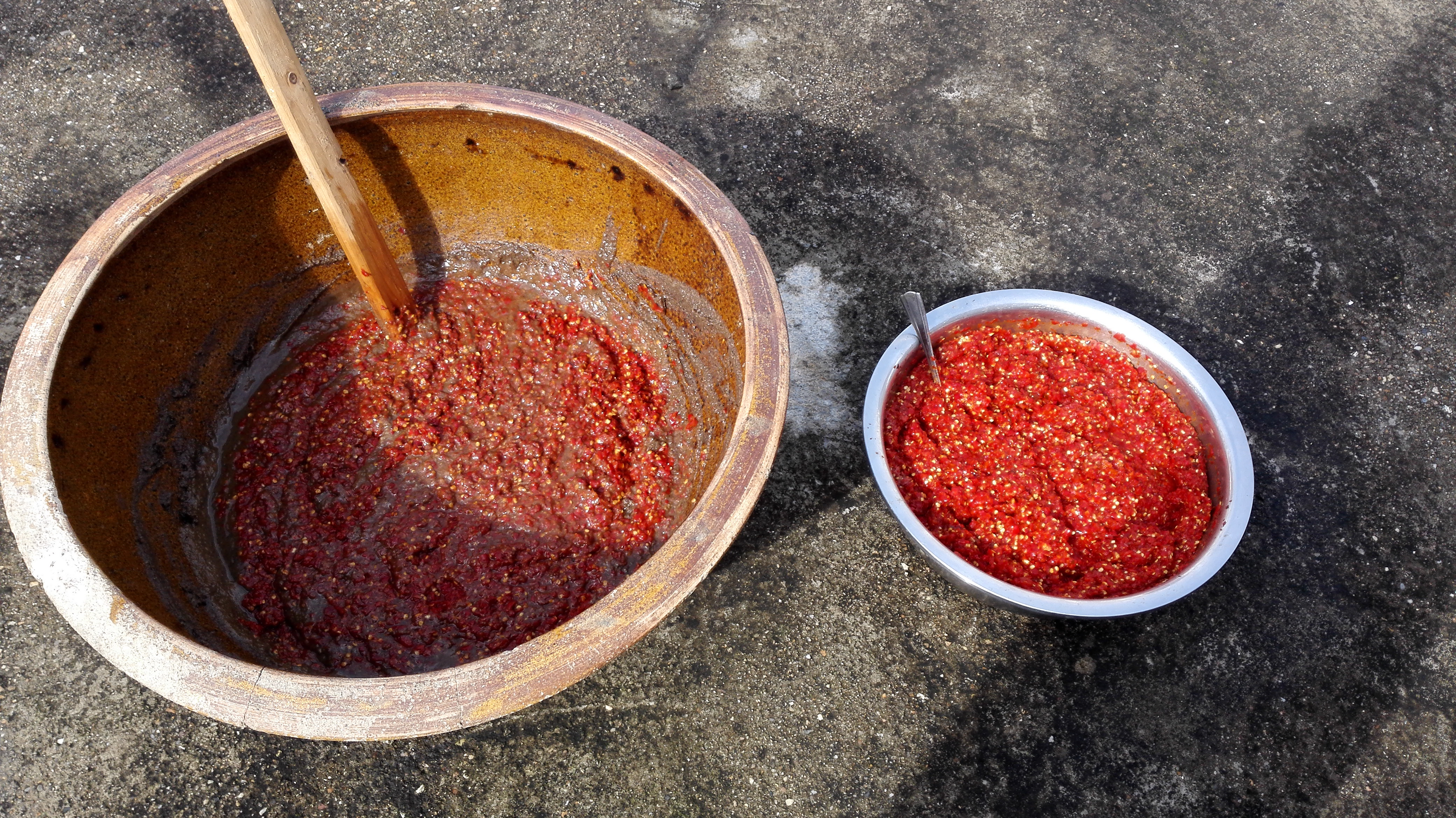
Yongfeng chili sauce in fermenting bowls

== List of notable dishes ==
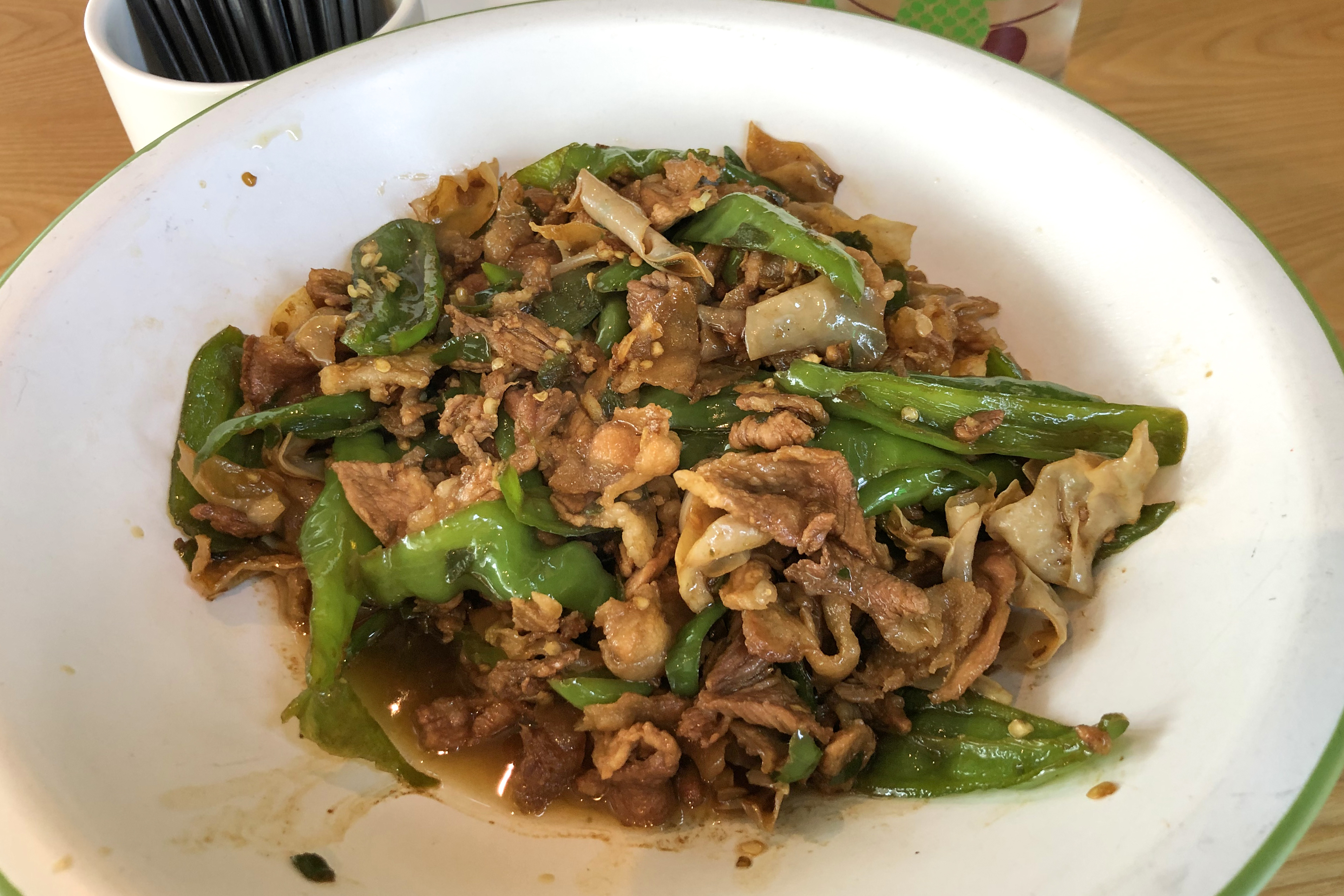
Sautéed pork with chili pepper

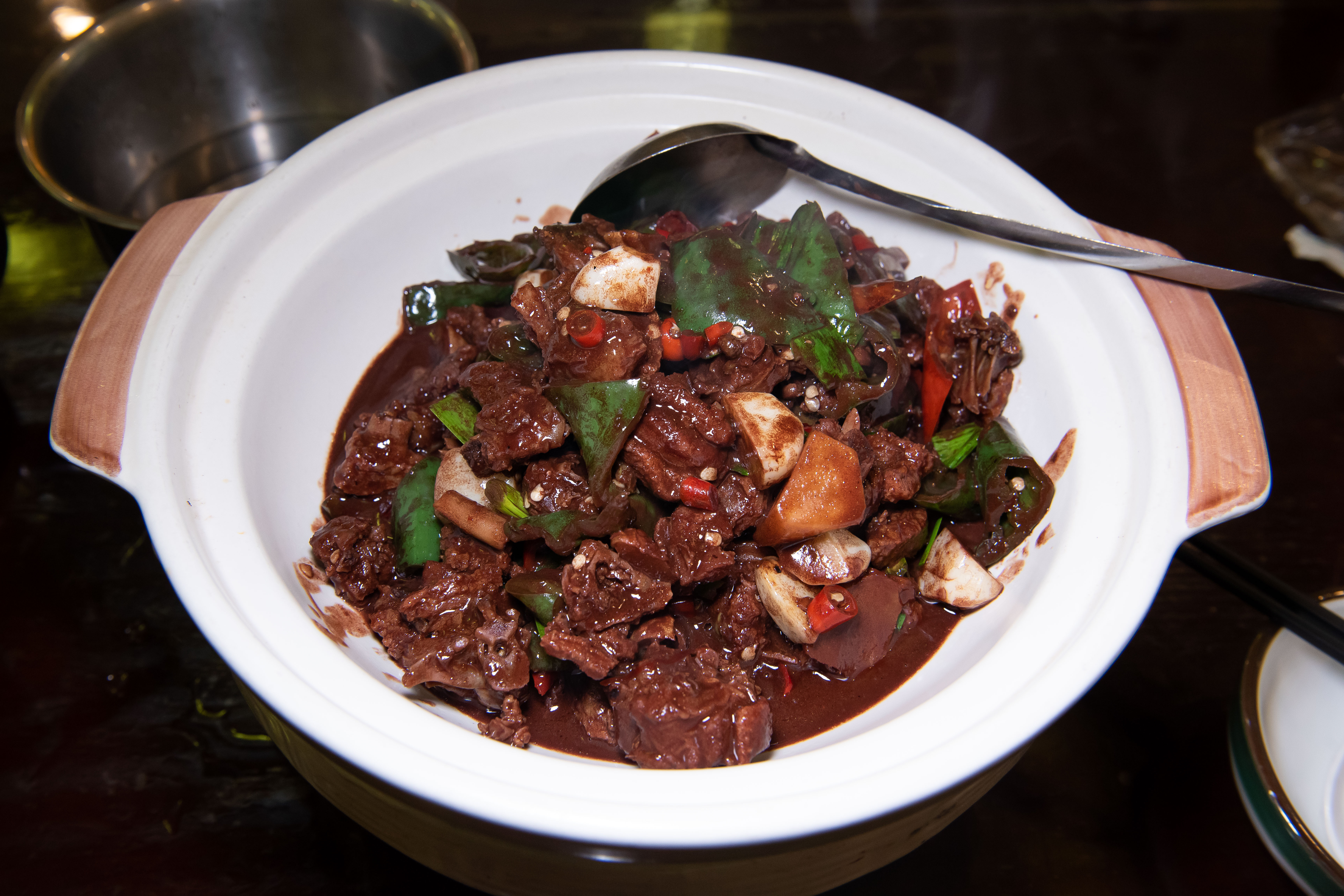
Xueya, sautéed duck with duck blood, originated from Yongzhou

English	Traditional Chinese	Simplified Chinese	Pinyin	Notes
Changsha-style rice vermicelli	長沙米粉	长沙米粉	chǎngshā mǐfěn	
Changde-style stewed beef with rice vermicelli	常德牛肉粉	常德牛肉粉	chángdé niúròu fěn	
Changsha stinky tofu	長沙臭豆腐	长沙臭豆腐	chǎngshā chòu dòufu	
Cured ham with cowpeas	酸豆角炒臘肉	酸豆角炒腊肉	suān dòujiǎo chǎo làròu	
Dong'an chicken	東安子雞	东安子鸡	dōng'ān zǐjī	
"Dry-wok" chicken	乾鍋雞	干锅鸡	gānguō jī	
Home-style tofu	家常豆腐	家常豆腐	jiācháng dòufǔ	
Lotus seeds in rock sugar syrup	冰糖湘蓮	冰糖湘莲	bīngtáng xiānglián	
Mao's braised pork	毛氏紅燒肉	毛氏红烧肉	Máo shì hóngshāo ròu	
Mala chicken	麻辣子雞	麻辣子鸡	málà zǐjī	
Mashed shrimp in lotus pod	蓮藕蝦仁	莲藕虾仁	lián'ǒu xiārén	
Pearly meatballs	珍珠肉丸	珍珠肉丸	zhēnzhū ròuwán	
Pumpkin cake	南瓜餅	南瓜饼	nánguā bǐng	
Sautéed pork with chili pepper	農家小炒肉	农家小炒肉	nóngjiā xiǎo chǎoròu	
Smoky flavours steamed together	臘味合蒸	腊味合蒸	làwèi hézhēng	
Spare ribs steamed in bamboo	竹筒蒸排骨	竹筒蒸排骨	zhútǒng zhēng páigǔ	
Spicy crawfish	香辣口味蝦	香辣口味虾	xiāng là kǒu wèi xiā	
Steamed fish head in chili sauce	剁椒蒸魚頭	剁椒蒸鱼头	duòjiāo zhēng yútóu	
Stir-fried duck blood	炒血鴨	炒血鸭	chǎoxuéyā	
Stir-fried meat with douchi and chili peppers	豆豉辣椒炒肉	豆豉辣椒炒肉	dòuchǐ làjiāo chǎoròu	
Yongfeng chili sauce	永豐辣醬	永丰辣酱	yǒng fēng làjiàng	

A discussion of Hunan cuisine overall may list a number of piquant dishes, usually but not always very hot and spicy.

== See also ==
- List of Chinese dishes
