= Lotus seed =

Seed of plants in the genus Nelumbo

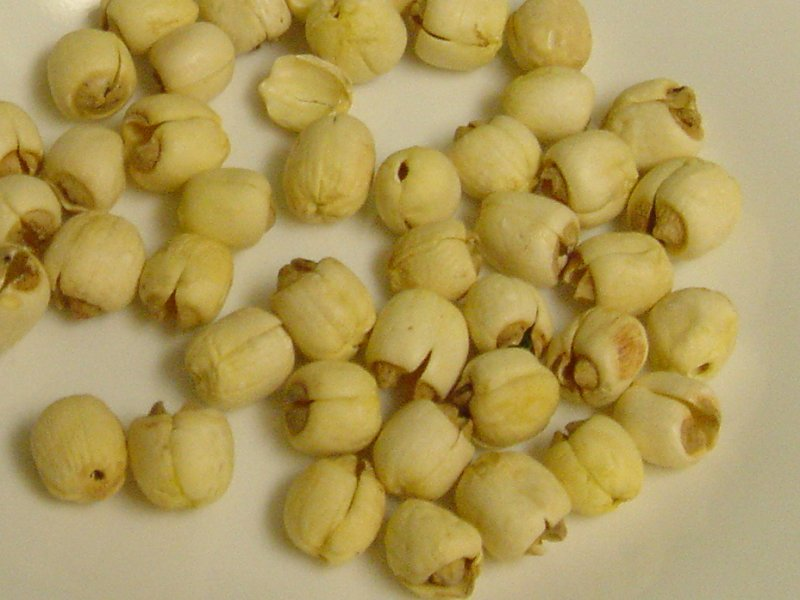
- Dried lotus seeds as they are commonly found in the market
- Traditional Chinese: 蓮子
- Simplified Chinese: 莲子
- Hanyu Pinyin: liánzǐ
- Jyutping: lin4 zi2
- Literal meaning: lotus seed
Transcriptions
Standard Mandarin
- Hanyu Pinyin: liánzǐ
Yue: Cantonese
- Jyutping: lin4 zi2
Southern Min
- Hokkien POJ: liân-chí

A lotus seed or lotus nut is the seed of plants in the genus Nelumbo, particularly the species Nelumbo nucifera. The seeds are used in Asian cuisine and traditional medicine. Mostly sold in dried, shelled form, the seeds are rich in protein, B vitamins, and dietary minerals.

== Types ==
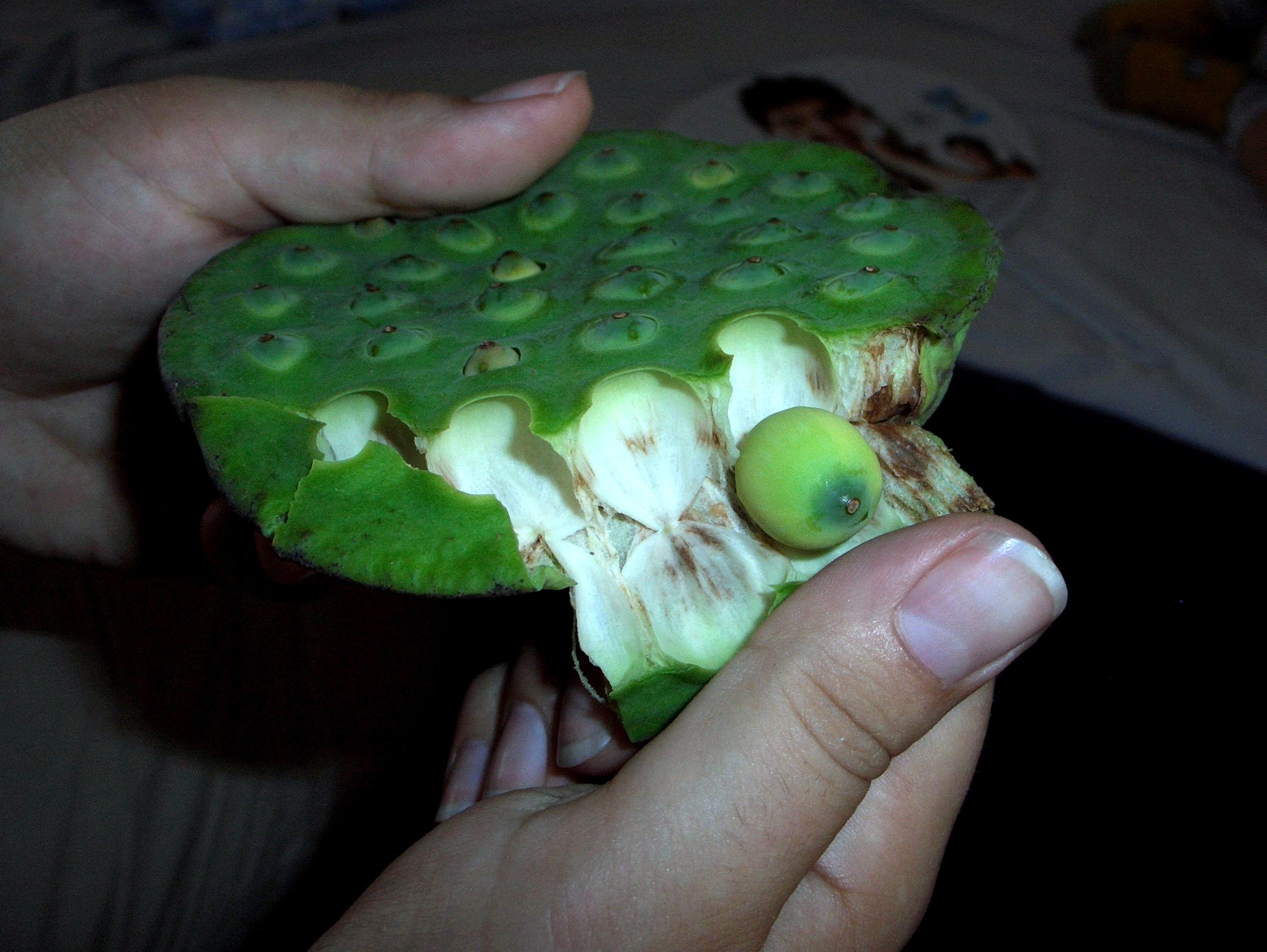
Eating fresh lotus seeds from a lotus (Nelumbo) seed head

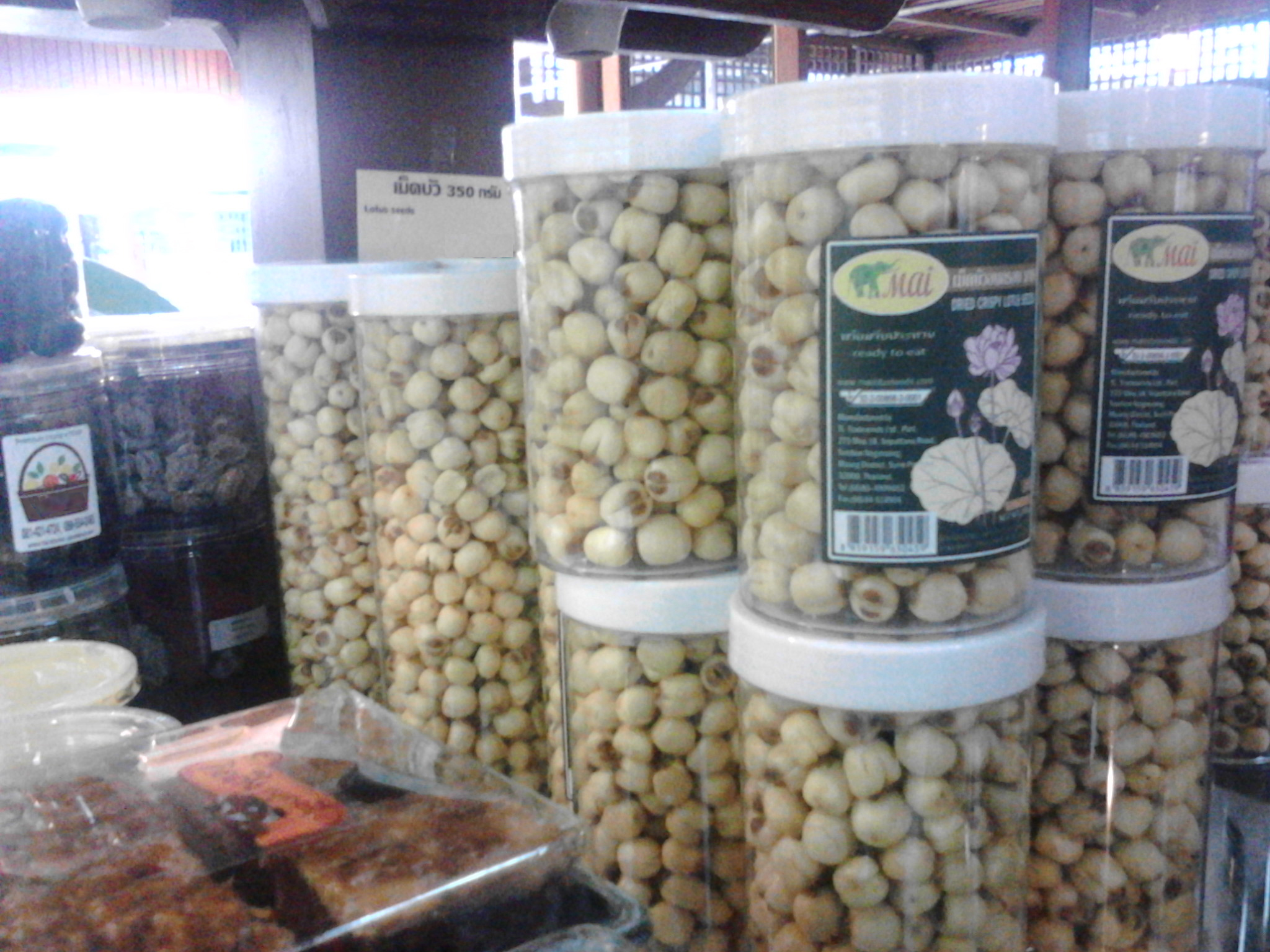
Dried lotus seeds snack for sale in Thailand

Two types of dried lotus seeds can be found commercially; brown peel and white. The former is harvested when the seed head of the lotus is ripe or nearly ripe and the latter is harvested when the seed head is still fully green but with almost fully developed seeds. White lotus seeds are de-shelled and de-membraned. At harvest, the bitter-tasting germ of most seeds is removed using a hollow needle. Brown peel lotus seeds are brown because the ripened seed has adhered to its membrane. The germ of these hard seeds is removed by cracking the seeds in half.

Dried lotus seeds past their prime oxidize to a yellow brown color. However, some sellers of dried lotus seeds bleach their products with hydrogen peroxide, sodium hydroxide, or other chemicals.

== Nutrition ==
In a 100 gram reference amount, dried lotus seeds contain 332 calories and consist of 64% carbohydrates, 2% fat, 15% protein, and 14% water. The seeds are high in B vitamins, particularly thiamin at 43% of the Daily Value (DV), and numerous dietary minerals, such as manganese (116% DV) and phosphorus (63% DV).

== Uses ==
The most common use of the seed is in the form of lotus seed paste (蓮蓉), which is used extensively in Chinese pastries as well as in Japanese desserts.

Dried lotus seeds must be soaked in water overnight prior to use. They can then be added directly to soups and congee or used in other dishes. Fresh lotus seeds are sold in the seed heads of the plant and eaten by breaking the individual seeds out of the cone-shaped head and removing the rubbery shell. Crystallized lotus seeds (蓮子糖), made by drying lotus seeds cooked in syrup, are a common Chinese snack, especially during Chinese new year. Xiangtan or Xianglian lotus seeds, along with Yongfeng chili sauce and Changsha stinky tofu are collectively referred to as "Hunan Sanbao" or Hunan's three treasures.

Lotus seeds are also common in the northern part of Colombia, especially in cities like Barranquilla and Cartagena. Locals usually refer to lotus seeds as "martillo." Fresh lotus seeds are sold in street markets and are generally eaten raw by the locals.

== See also ==
- Chinese cuisine
- Lotus seed tea
- Nelumbo nucifera
- Red bean paste
