= Yongfeng chili sauce =

Chinese fermented hot sauce

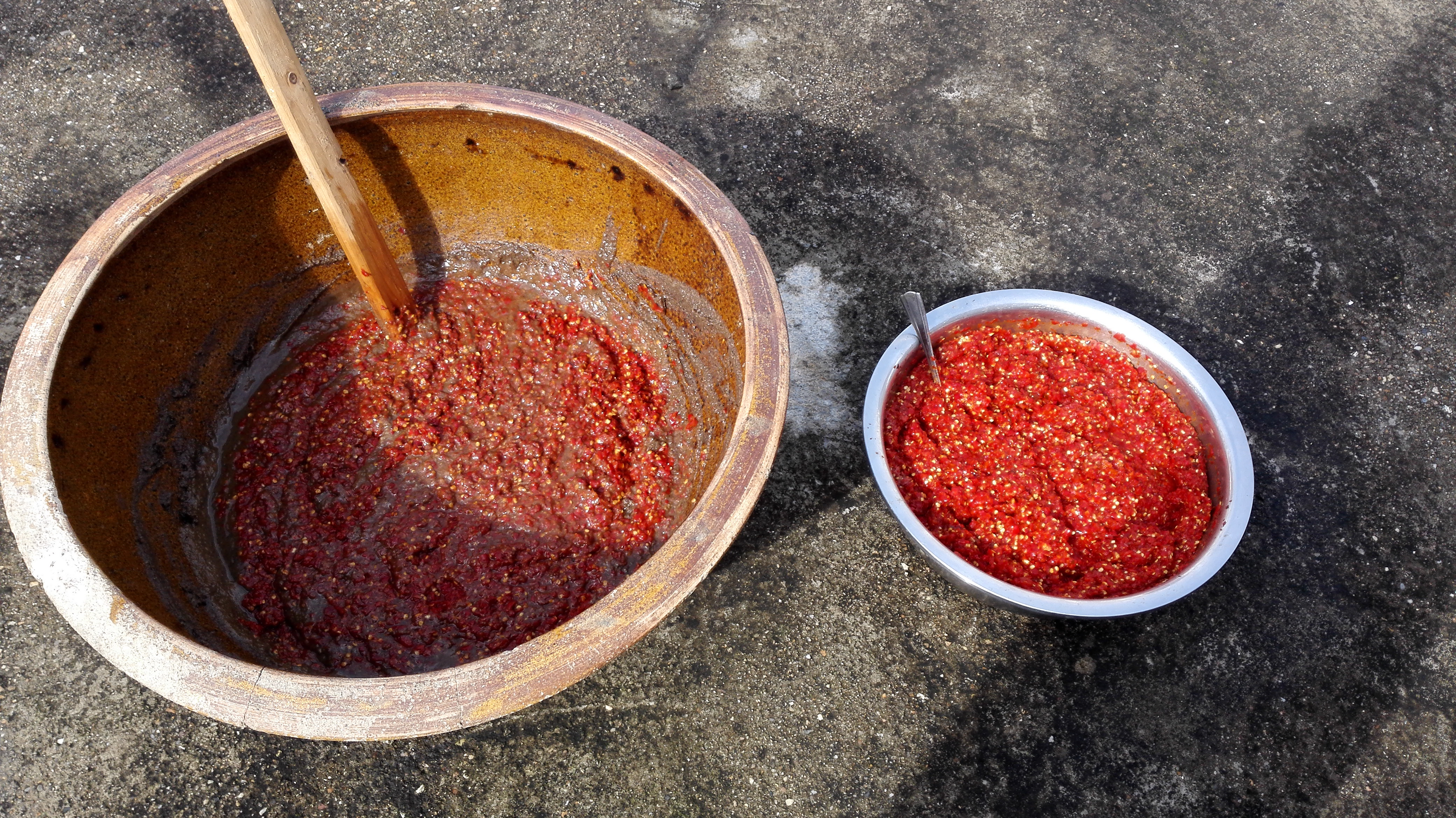
Yongfeng chili sauce in fermenting bowls

Yongfeng chili sauce (Chinese: 永丰辣酱; pinyin: Yǒngfēng làjiàng) or Yongfeng hot sauce is a traditional product made at Yongfeng, Shuangfeng County, Hunan, China. It is recognized by China as a Geographical Indication Product.

Yongfeng chili sauce is made of Yongfeng chili, polished glutinous rice, wheat, soybeans, and salt. It is prepared by boiling, grinding, mixing, fermenting, and aging, and produces a dark red, spicy sauce.

== Characteristics ==
The finished sauce is a translucent reddish-brown with an amber luster, fragrant with Yongfeng pepper and wheat, and has a mellow sweet and spicy flavor.

== History and culture ==
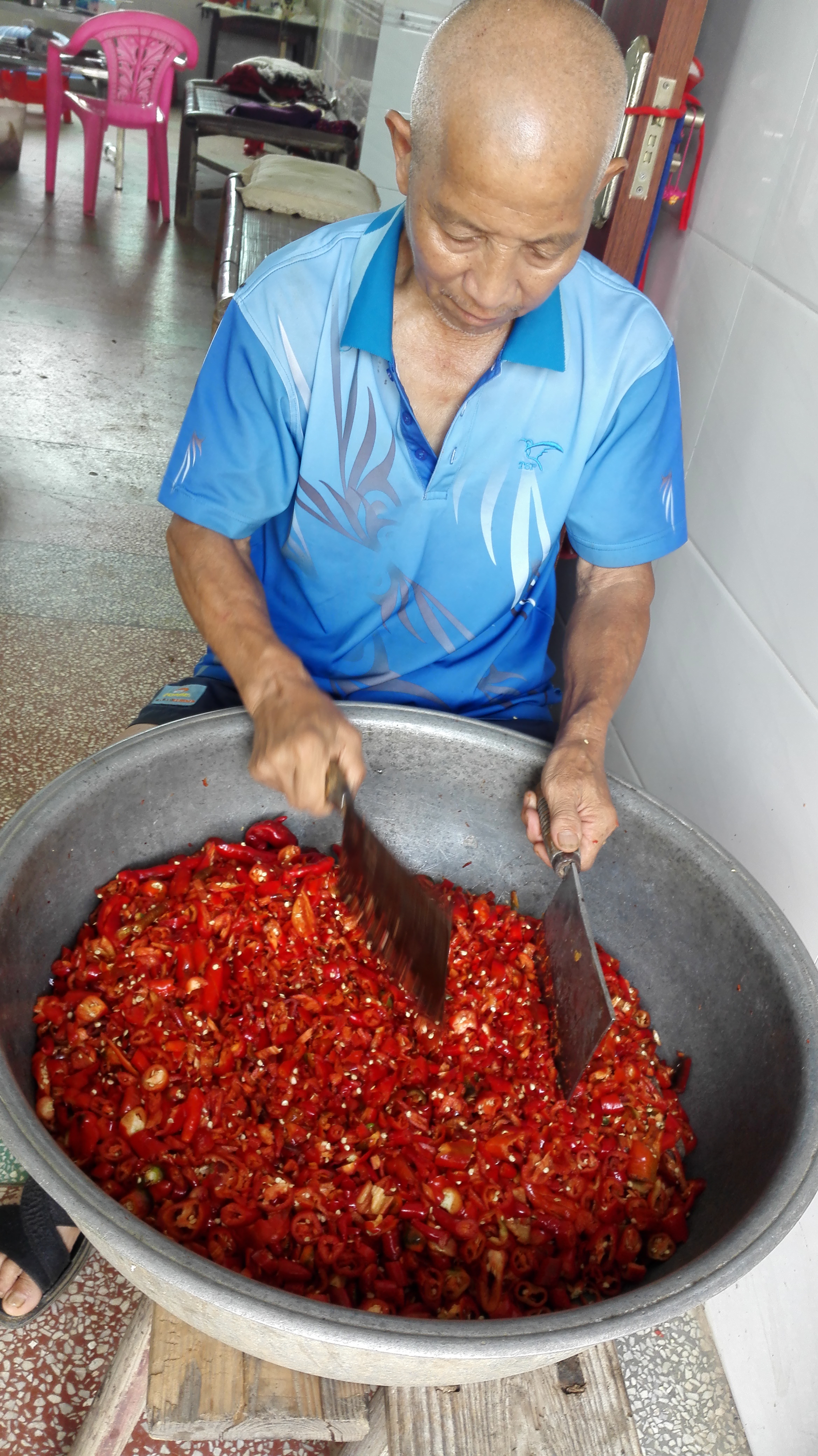
A farmer in Yuanxiao Village, Yongfeng, chops peppers

People began to make chili sauce in the Yongfeng area during China's Ming dynasty during the reign of Chongzhen Emperor. The chili sauce has been made in Yongfeng for more than 300 years.

Annual production starts after the Dragon Boat Festival as the rainy season ends. Home cooks make their own sauces, and rooftops of houses often have a sauce tank fermenting in the sun.

Along with Xiangtan lotus seeds and Changsha stinky tofu, Yongfeng chili sauce is known as "Hunan Sanbao" or one of Hunan's three treasures.

== Business and economics ==
According to a government report, Yongfeng chili sauce sales revenues were nearly 100 million yuan in the year 2000, representing taxes and profits of 30,000,000 CNY (US$4,469,550) for Shuangfeng county.

By 2009, there were more than 100 chili sauce production enterprises in Shuangfeng county, including 3 enterprises with an annual production capacity of over 2,000 tons.

== Ingredients and production ==
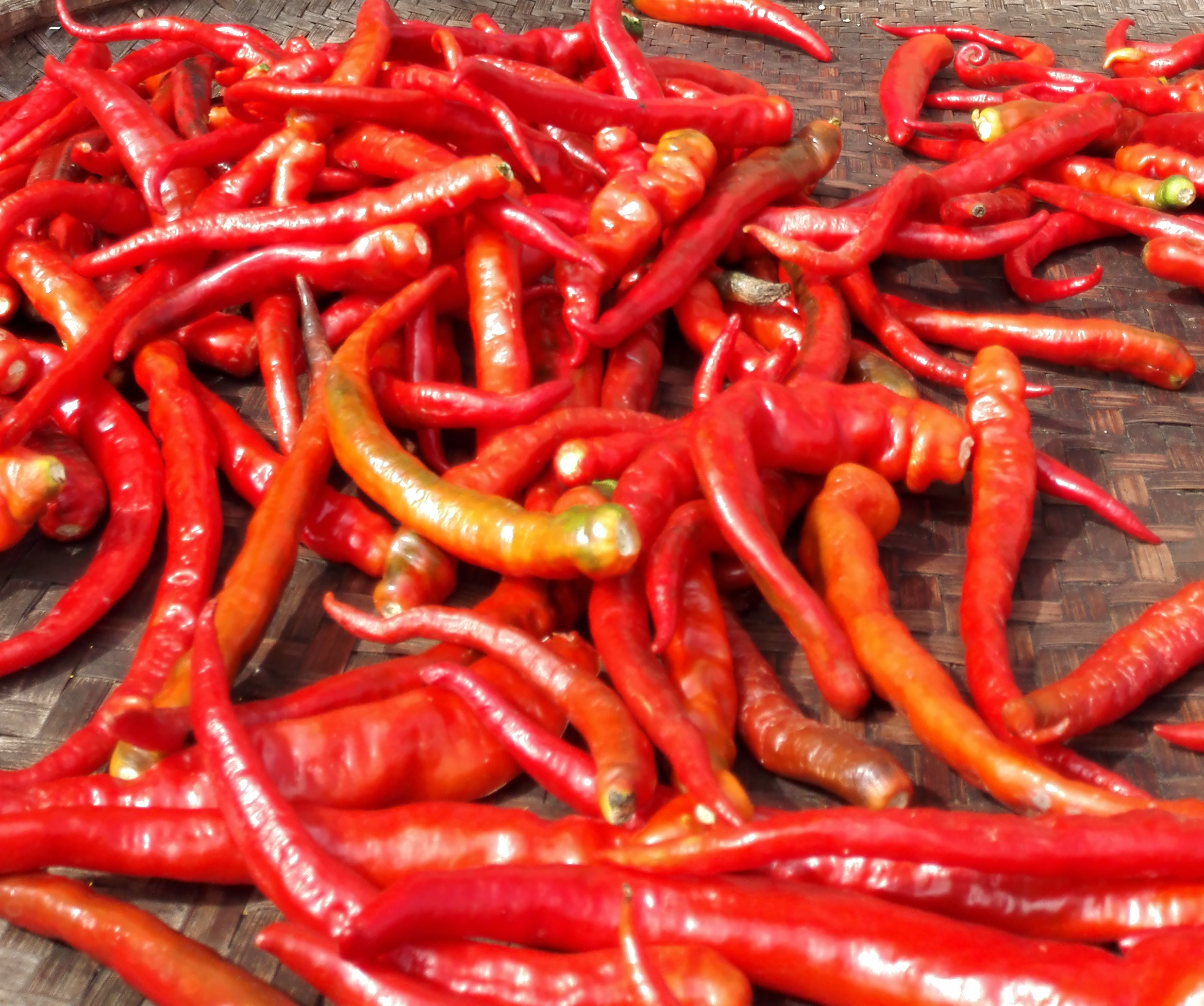
Cow-horn peppers used in the production of Yongfeng sauce

Yongfeng chili sauce can be made with bell pepper, cow-horn pepper and line pepper.

=== Industrial production ===
The Chinese government in 2007 approved an application for Geographical Indication Products status for Yongfeng chili sauce, specifying the ingredients and their proportions for industrial production. These are:

- 50% fresh Yongfeng red pepper, bell pepper, horn pepper
- 7% wheat flour
- 3.5% glutinous rice flour
- 2.5% soybean powder
- 25% water
- 9% salt.

The specified process calls for boiling the soybean, wheat, and rice flours, crushing or grinding the chili pepper, adding salt, then a natural fermentation process in which the sauce is set in the sun in open containers to ferment and form koji.

=== Home production ===
Local farmers and many families each have an inherited family recipe, which they adjust according to family members' flavor preferences. For example, some local vegetables named Dao Dou (sword bean Canavalia gladiata (Jacq.) DC.) and Di Can (Stachys geobombycis C. Y. Wu) are added into the chili sauce in Yuan Xiao village.

The quality of the sauce relies on the weather. The mixed materials need to be exposed under strong sunshine for about 40 days until the color of the sauce is dark red and the aroma is overflowing. Usually, the sunshine near the summer season in Shuangfeng county is qualified. Traditionally, the fermentation is taken under sunshine but, for some industrial processes, temperature-controlled fermentation technology is usually a guarantee of production and quality.
