= Piragua (food) =

Puerto Rican shaved ice dessert

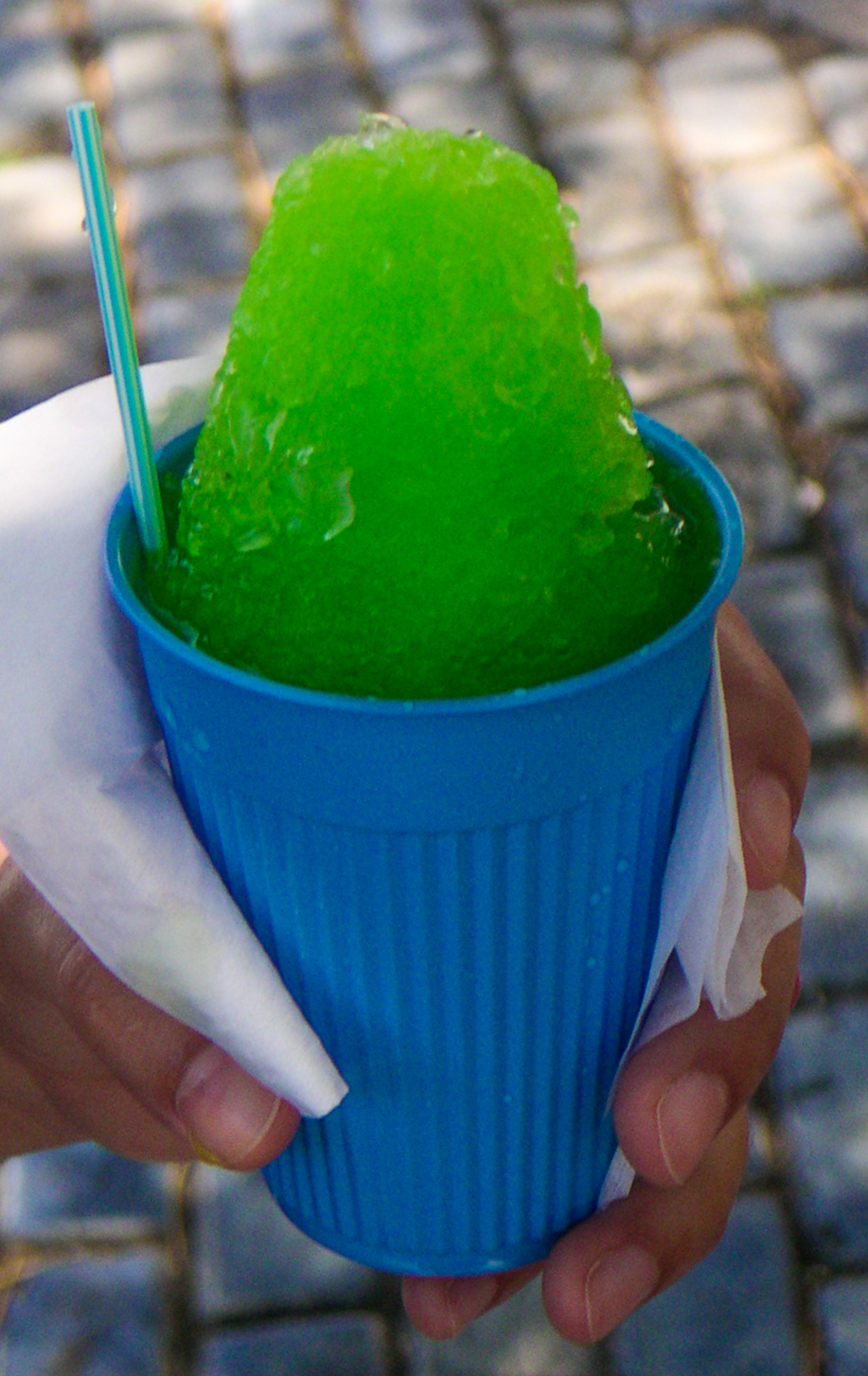
- Course: Dessert
- Place of origin: Puerto Rico
- Serving temperature: Frozen
- Main ingredients: Shaved ice; fruit‑flavored syrup
- Similar dishes: Shave ice; snow cone

A piragua (/pɪˈrɑːɡwə/; Spanish pronunciation: [piˈɾaɣwa]) is a Puerto Rican shaved ice dessert, shaped like a cone, consisting of shaved ice and covered with fruit-flavored syrup. Piraguas are sold by vendors, known as piragüeros, from small, traditionally brightly colored pushcarts offering a variety of flavors. Besides Puerto Rico, piraguas can be found in areas of the United States with large Puerto Rican communities, such as New York and Central Florida.

== Definition ==
In Puerto Rico, the word piragua refers to a frozen treat made of shaved ice and covered with fruit-flavored syrup. Unlike the American snow cone which is round and resembles a snowball, the piragua is pointy and shaped like a pyramid. The word piragua is derived from the combination of the Spanish words pirámide ('pyramid') and agua ('water'). In Latin America, frozen treats similar to the piragua are known by many different names.

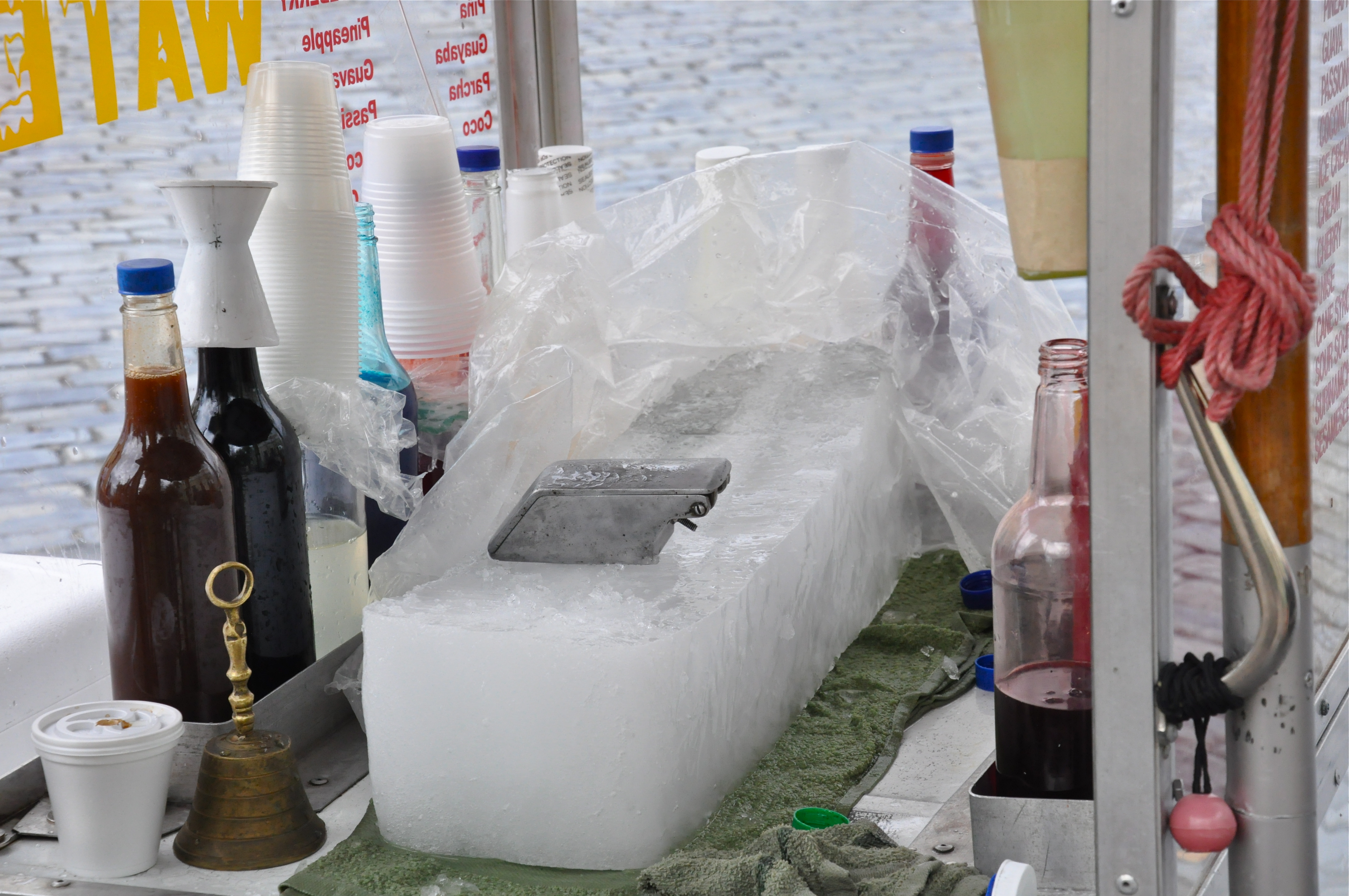
Piraguas, Puerto Rican shaved ice

== Preparation and sale ==
=== Piragüeros ===
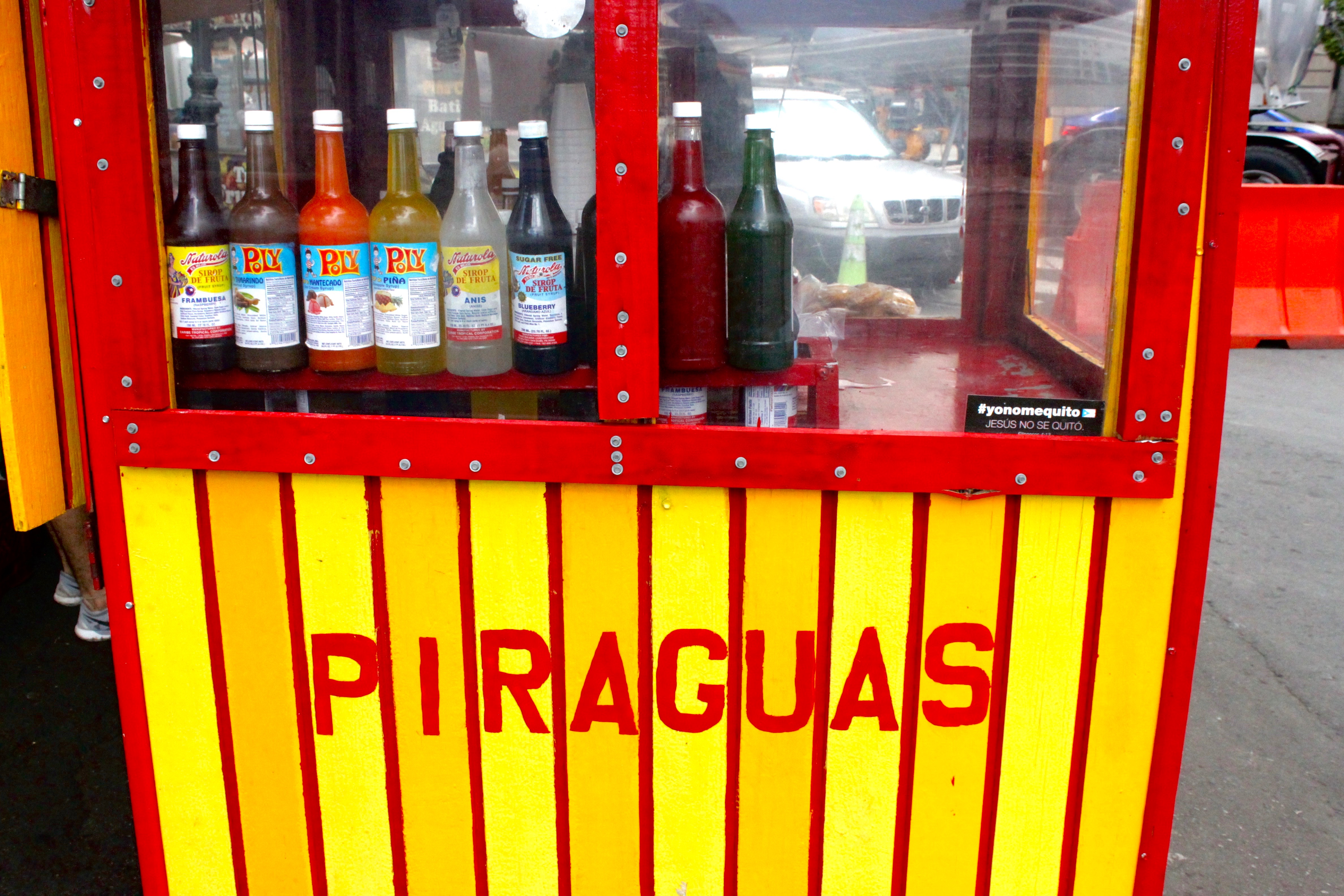
Piragua cart in Old San Juan

A piragua vendor is known as a piragüero. Most piragüeros sell their product from a colorful wooden pushcart that carries an umbrella, instead of from a fixed stand or kiosk.

The piragüero makes the treats from the shavings off a block of solid ice inside his cart and mixtures of fruit-flavored syrups. The tropical syrup flavors vary from lemon and strawberry to passion fruit and guava. Once the syrups are ready, the piragüero will go to his place of business, which in Puerto Rico is usually close to the town plaza, while in the United States it is usually close to the public parks near Hispanic neighborhoods, to sell his product.

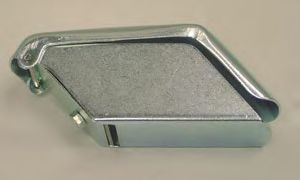
Hand ice shaver used by piragüeros

In the process of preparing a piragua, the piragüero shaves the ice from the block of ice with a hand ice shaver. He then puts the shaved ice into a cup and uses a funnel-shaped tool to give it the distinctive pyramid shape. The piragüero finishes making the piragua when he pours the desired flavored syrup over it. Piragüeros only go out on hot, sunny days because those are the only days when they can expect good business.

Unlike the typical American snow cone, which is often eaten with a spoon, the piragua is eaten straight out of the cup or sipped through a straw.

=== Flavored syrups ===
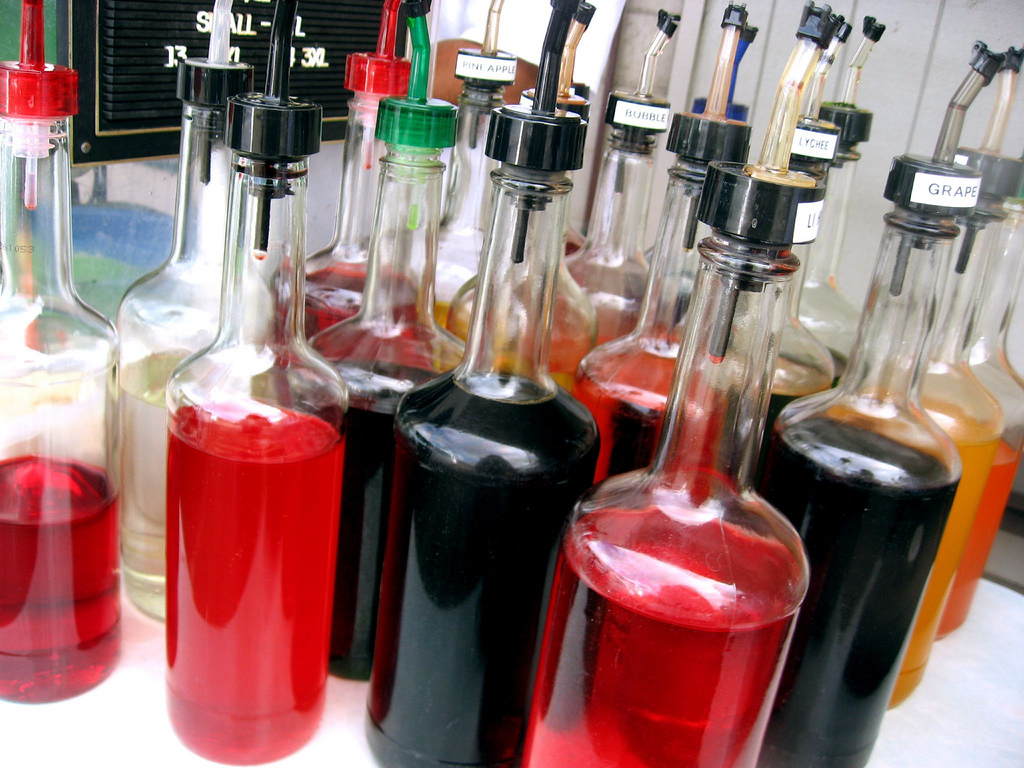
Fruit flavored syrups

Flavored syrups commonly used in piraguas include:

- ajonjolí (sesame seed)
- anis (anise)
- cereza (cherry)
- china (orange)
- coco (coconut)
- crema (cream)
- frambuesa (red raspberry)
- fresa (strawberry)
- guanábana (soursop)
- guayaba (guava)
- limón (lemon)
- mango (mango)
- mandarin (mandarin orange)
- maví (mauby)
- melao (sugar cane syrup)
- melón (honeydew)
- parcha (passion fruit)
- piña (pineapple)
- tamarindo (tamarind)
- uva (grape)
- vainilla (vanilla)

Two of the terms used for fruit flavors in Puerto Rico are not common in other Spanish-speaking places. China, a sweet orange flavor, is referred to as naranja in most other Spanish-speaking locales; however, in Puerto Rico, naranja refers only to the bitter orange. Melón, an Anglicism derived from the English word watermelon, is called sandía in standard Spanish.

== In the United States ==
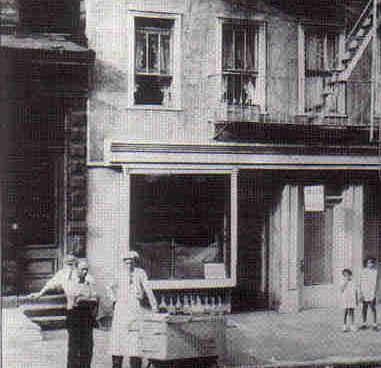
A piragüero in NYC posing with his piragua pushcart in the 1920s

In the 1940s, during the Puerto Rican Great Migration in which large numbers of Puerto Ricans moved to New York, they took with them their customs and traditions, including the piraguas.

According to Holding Aloft the Banner of Ethiopia by Winston James, piraguas were introduced in New York by Puerto Ricans as early as 1926. In his book, James describes the presence of piragua pushcarts during the Harlem Riots against the Puerto Rican migrants in July 1926. Author Miguel Meléndez, who moved from New York City to Chicago in the late 1950s, expresses in his book We Took the Streets: Fighting for Latino Rights the following:

For me, as a Puerto Rican born and raised in New York, a piragua pushcart vendor is a very special person. He represents an important part of our culture. Those shaved-ice cones filled with Caribbean tropical syrups, not only ease the body during the hot summers, their sweet goodness reminds of us of who we are and where we come from, without words.

The piragua was mentioned by the U.S. Environmental Protection Agency (EPA) in a blog post titled "What's in Your Piragua?" EPA Deputy Administrator Marcus Peacock noted that the EPA had helped the Puerto Rican government negotiate over $1 billion in new water treatment improvements, and added, "As this commitment is fulfilled, the water will just get cleaner and cleaner whether it is coming out of a tap or is served in a piragua (no, not a canoe, but a Puerto Rican snow cone) – regardless of the weather."

Piragua vending is not limited to Puerto Rico and New York. Piragüeros with their piragua pushcarts can be found in Spain and Hispanic neighborhoods in Bridgeport, Chicago, Jersey City, Miami, Newark, Philadelphia, and elsewhere.

== Cultural influence ==
The Puerto Rican piragua has been the subject of paintings and sculpture, a children's book, and songs in a Broadway musical:

- The painting Carrito de Piraguas ("Piragua Pushcart") is a mixed media piece by an unknown artist, on exhibit at El Museo del Barrio in New York.
- Artist Iván Moura Limardo created a series of piragua-related paintings, including Piragüero 5 and Piragüero 10, which were displayed at the Siena Art Gallery in San Juan, Puerto Rico.
- The town of Coamo, Puerto Rico, commissioned the creation of a monument in the honor of the piragüeros. The statue, which is called Monumento al Piragüero, is located in the town plaza.
- An educational storybook called Luisito and the Piragua, written in 1979 for children of migrant workers in Connecticut, tells the story of a Puerto Rican boy who moved to the United States and misses his friends and his afternoon treat of a piragua. While on an errand for his mother, Luisito sees a piragüero making piraguas, and is happy to find that he can buy piraguas once more.
- The 2008 Broadway production of Lin-Manuel Miranda's musical In the Heights included a song called "Piragua" and its reprise, in which a local piragüero (known in the play as Piragua Guy) sings about his life and trade in New York's Washington Heights. This character became the basis for a web-based reality-show parody, Legally Brown: The Search for the Next Piragua Guy, directed by Miranda, which featured well-known Broadway actors competing to take over the role. In the 2021 film adaptation, Miranda himself was cast in the supporting role of the Piragüero.
- The 2026 Super Bowl halftime show featuring Bad Bunny included a piragua vendor among other references to Puerto Rican culture.

== Gallery ==
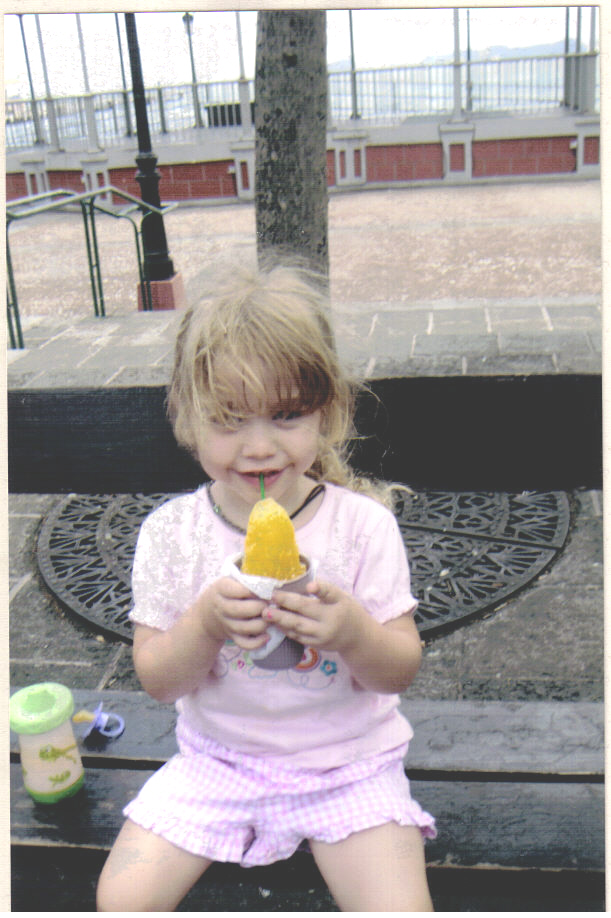
Little girl eating a piragua in Puerto Rico, 2008

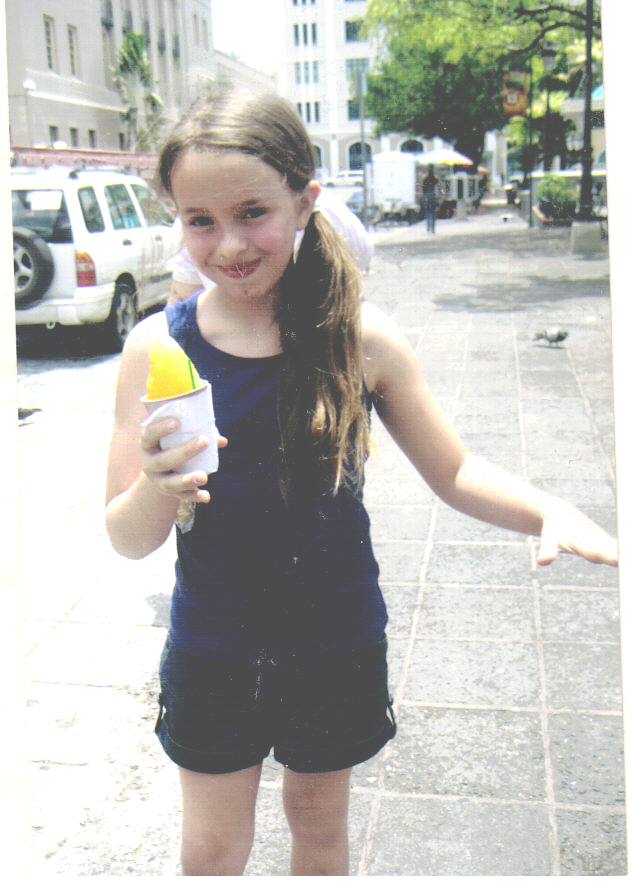
Girl with a parcha-flavored piragua in Puerto Rico

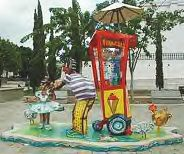
Monumento al Piragüero in Coamo, Puerto Rico

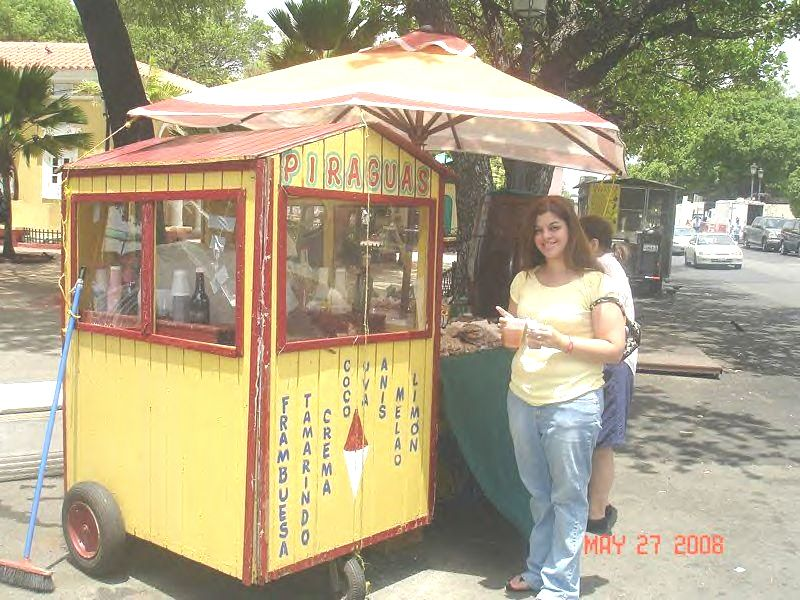
Customer posing with an older wooden piragua pushcart in Puerto Rico

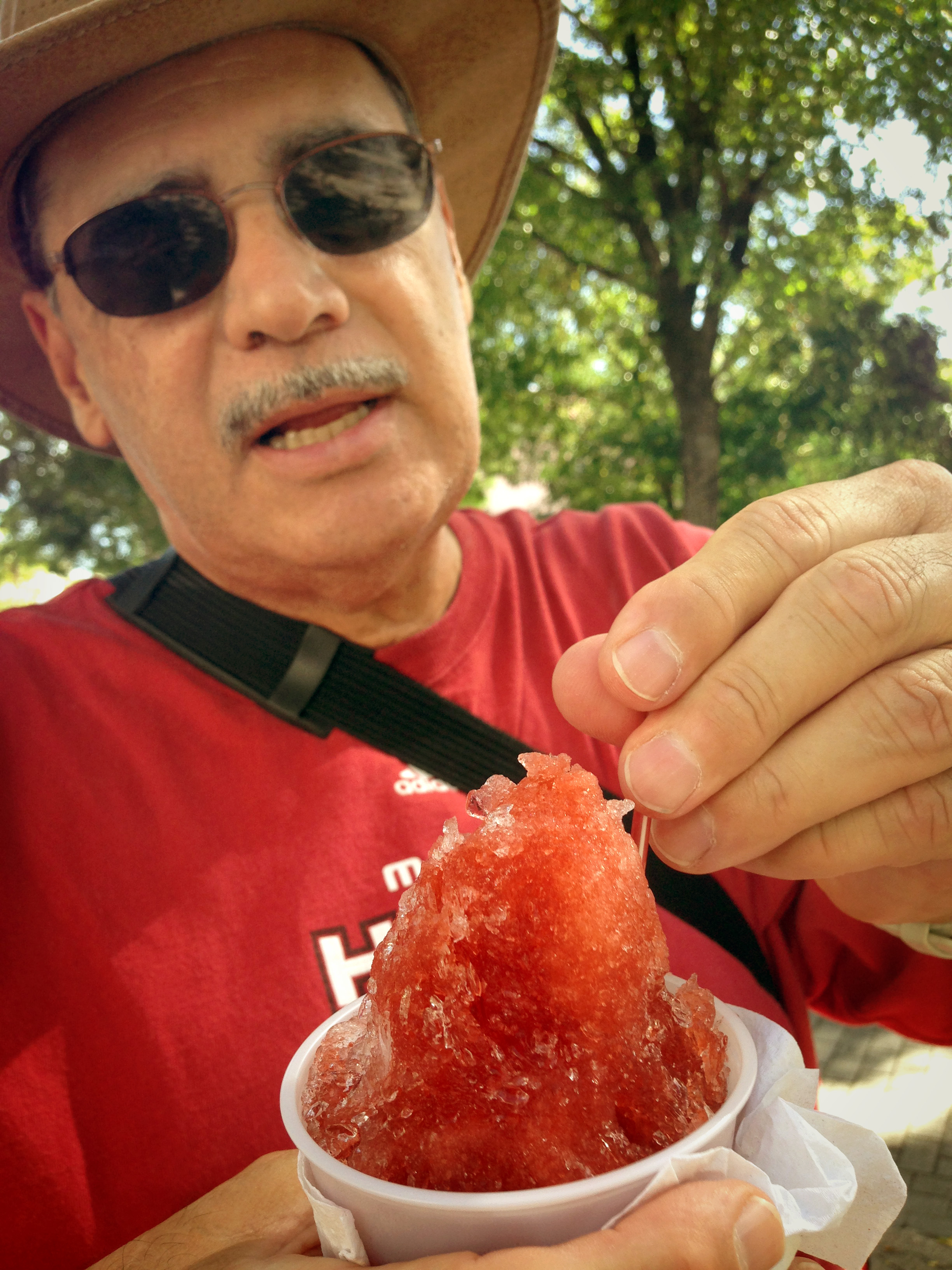
Man with piragua on Paseo de la Princesa

== See also ==
Other regional versions:

- Ais kacang – Southeast Asian
- Grattachecca and Italian ice – Italian
- Halo halo – Filipino
- Kakigori – Japanese
- Patbingsu – Korean
- Tshuah-ping – Taiwanese
- Shave ice – Hawaiian
- Sno-ball – New Orleanian
- Snow cone – American shaved ice
- Raspadilla – Peru
