= Ais kacang =

Malaysian dessert

Ais kacang اءيس كاچڠ
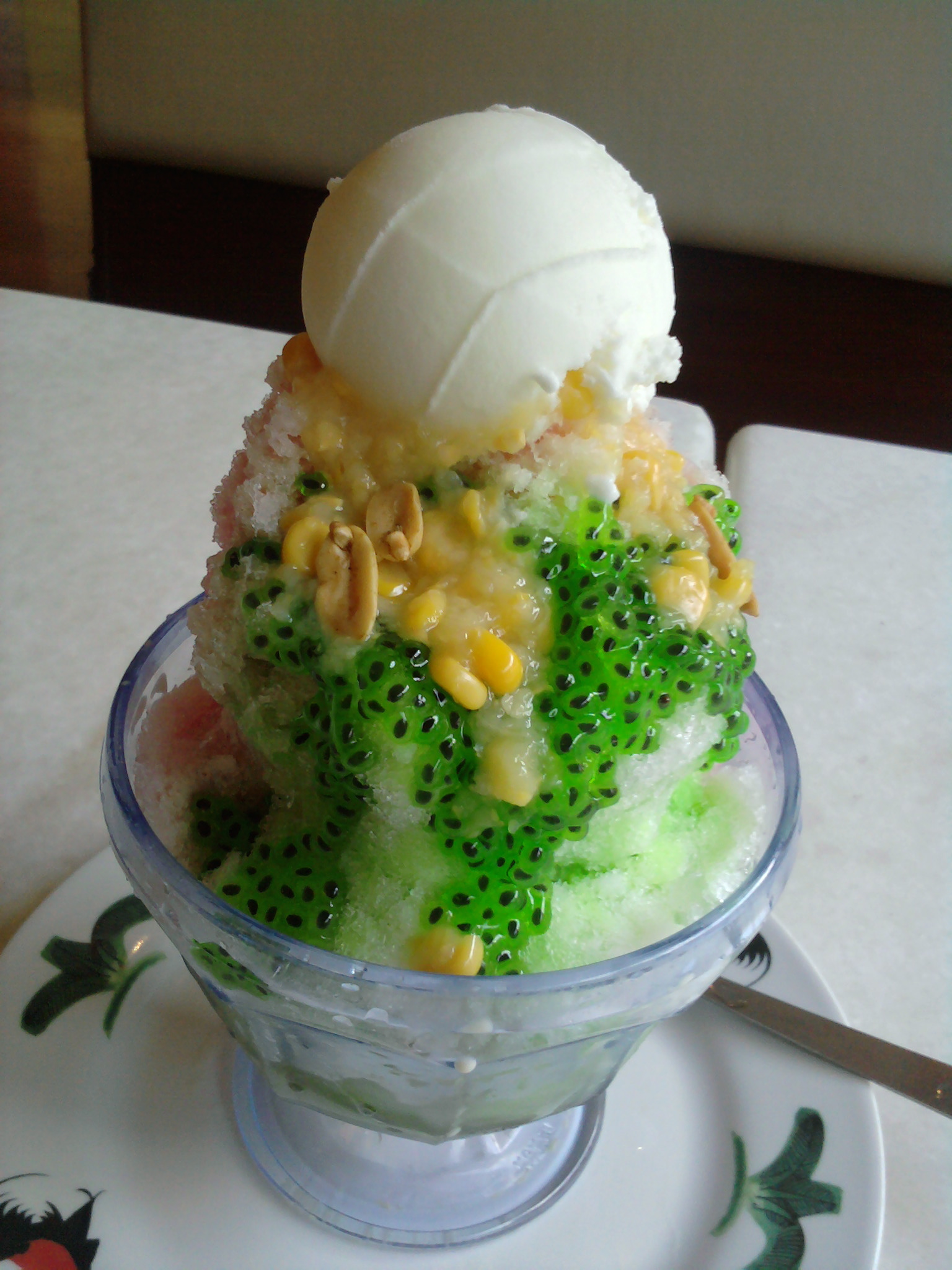
- Ais kacang topped with basil seeds, peanuts, corn, and a scoop of ice cream.
- Alternative names: ABC, air batu campur, ice kachang
- Course: Dessert
- Place of origin: Malaysia
- Region or state: Southeast Asia
- Associated cuisine: Malaysia, Singapore, Brunei
- Created by: Malaysian Malays
- Main ingredients: Shaved ice, red beans

Ais kacang (Malay pronunciation: [aɪs ˈkatʃaŋ]; Jawi: اءيس كاچڠ "bean ice", also anglicized as ice kachang) or air batu campur ([air ˈbatu tʃamˈpʊr]), Jawi: اءير باتو چمڤور "mixed ice", often abbr. ABC) is a dessert common in Malaysia, Singapore and Brunei.

Traditionally, an ice shaving machine is used to churn out the shaved ice used in the dessert, originally hand cranked but now more often motorised. Many coffee shops, hawker centres and food courts sell this dessert.

== History ==
Early versions of ice kacang was first known to have been prepared around the time before and after the First World War, where costs of manufacturing ice (in Malay: air batu or ais) became more affordable. An earlier variant of the Singaporean dish was described as green, made from shaved ice, paired with syrups, "soaked seeds" and seaweed jelly and was sold mainly by street vendors. The dish underwent many different alterations and variants throughout the history of Singapore, where during the 1920s, one version of it was described as shaved ice topped with rose water, lime or liquorice. A version of the dish, known as kachang mera using canned adzuki (in Malay: kacang merah "red bean", hence named such) was also sold during the 1930s. By the 1940s, the version of the dish described as having "shaved ice heaped into a little mountain", topped with red/adzuki beans, "a Chinese grape-like fruit", syrup, and condensed or evaporated milk, similar to how it is being prepared today, began to appear. Some earlier variants of ais kacang are no longer sold, such as the ice ball version of the dessert, which was popular during the 1950s and 1960s.

== Preparation ==
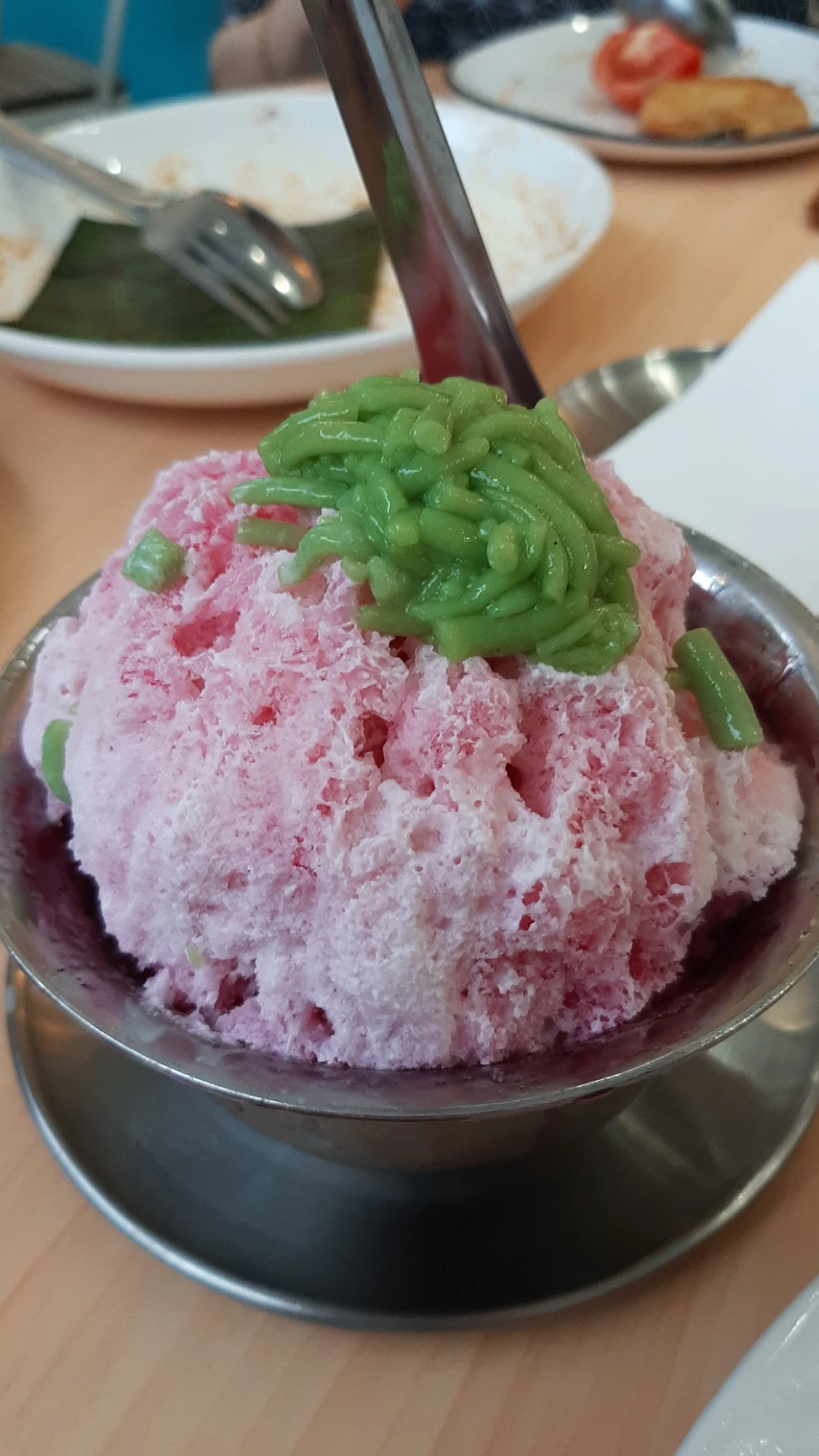
A bowl of Malaysian ais kacang topped with rose syrup and cendol

Ais kacang was originally made of only shaved ice and red beans, though the number and diversity of ingredients has since expanded. Today, ais kacang generally comes in bright colors and with various fruit cocktails and dressings.

In Malaysia, variants now contain a large serving of attap chee (palm seed), red beans, whole or puréed sweet corn, grass jelly, roasted peanuts, and cubes of agar agar as common ingredients. Other less common ingredients include aloe vera, cendol, nata de coco, and ice cream. A final topping of evaporated milk, condensed milk, or coconut milk is drizzled over the mountain of ice along with red rose syrup and sarsi syrup. Some stalls have even introduced novelty toppings such as durian and chocolate syrup. There are also versions that shun the multi-coloured syrup and are served instead with just a drizzling of palm sugar syrup.

In Singapore, traditional ice kachang is usually made from shaved ice, packed into a mountain-like shape and consists of red beans, puréed sweet corn, attap chee, cendol, and grass jelly, similar to the Malaysian version, and drizzled with syrups made from gula melaka, red rose syrup, and pandan syrup. The dish has evolved to include fruits such as durian, mango, toppings such as Milo, peanuts, and sago pearls among others.

== See also ==
Shaved ice § Regions, for similar shaved ice variations around the world.

- Kakigōri: Japanese shaved ice
- Bingsu: Korean shaved ice
- Tshuah-ping: Taiwanese shaved ice
- Halo-halo: Filipino shaved ice
- Es campur and Es teler: Indonesian shaved ice
- Namkhaeng sai and O-aew: Thai shaved ice
- Grattachecca: Italian shaved ice popular in Rome.
- Hawaiian shave ice: Hawaiian shaved ice
- Piragua: Puerto Rican shaved ice
