= Shaved ice =

Ice-based dessert

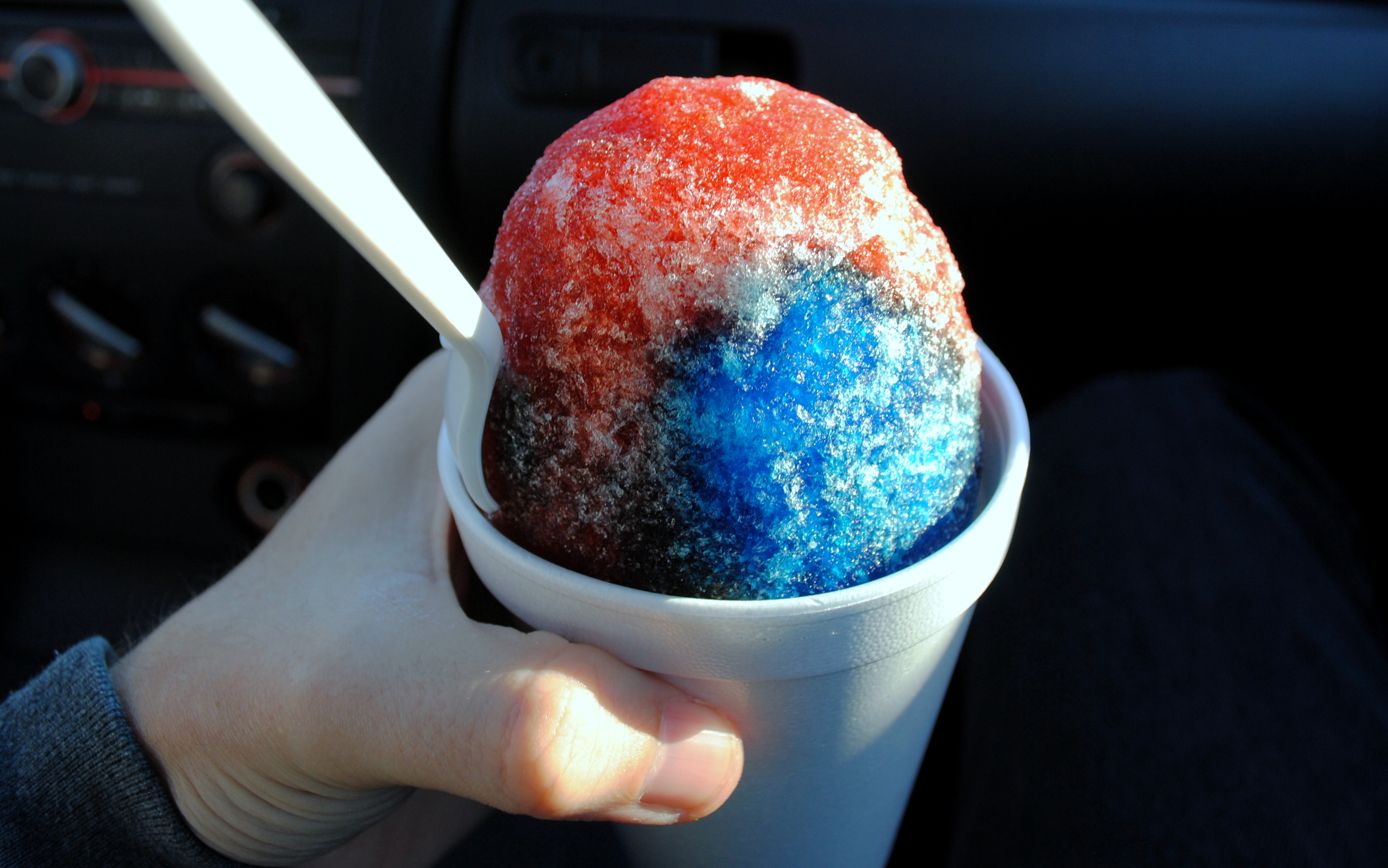
- Shaved ice with flavored syrup
- Type: Frozen dessert
- Course: Dessert; Snack
- Region or state: global
- Main ingredients: Ice; Syrup

Shaved ice is a large family of ice-based desserts made of fine shavings of ice and sweet condiments or flavored syrups. Usually, the syrup is added after the ice has been frozen and shaved—typically at the point of sale; however, flavoring can also be added before freezing. The dessert is consumed worldwide in various forms and ways. Shaved ice can also be mixed with large quantities of liquid to produce shaved ice drinks.

Many shaved ices are confused with "Italian ice", which is derived from the similar Italian dessert known as "granita". However, Italian ice, also known as "water ice", often has the fruit juice or other ingredients, like almond, incorporated into the sugared water before it is frozen. Shaved ice—especially highly commercial shaved ice (such as that found in food chains or from street vendors)—is often flavored after the ice has been frozen and shaved. Snow cones are an example of shaved ice that is flavored after production.

== History ==
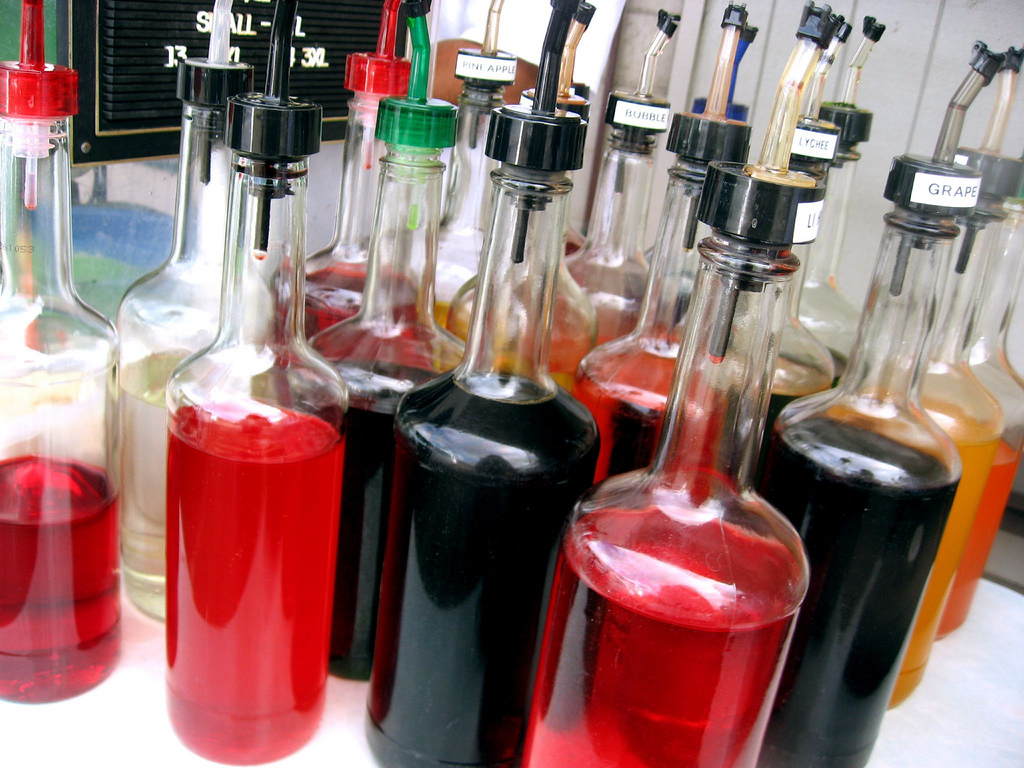
Syrups used for flavouring shaved ice

The use of stored and gathered ice for use in confections has been documented in ancient Persia since 400 BCE onward.

In imperial Japan, the dessert was a treat reserved for royalty, as it was made of natural ice formed during the coldest period of winter, which was stored in icehouses. This made it very rare, and a luxury available only to Heian period nobles. Halo-halo is believed to be a Filipino indigenized version of the Japanese kakigori class of desserts, originating from pre-war Japanese migrants to the Philippines. The earliest versions were composed only of cooked red beans or mung beans in crushed ice with sugar and milk, a dessert known locally as "mongo-ya". Over the years, more native ingredients were added, resulting in the development of the modern halo-halo. Some authors specifically attribute the invention of halo-halo to the 1920s or 1930s Japanese migrants in the Quinta Market of Quiapo, Manila, due to its proximity to the now defunct Insular Ice Plant, which was the source of the city's ice supply. As Japanese people immigrated to Hawaii, they brought this tradition with them. Like Persia and Japan, warm areas in Hawaii are close enough to snow-capped mountains that snow can be brought to the warm areas without melting.

== Regions ==
Shaved ice varieties can be found around the globe with Asia being a particularly popular region.

=== Americas ===
In Latin America shaved ice desserts have influences from North American cultures. In many of these locations the Spanish name is either raspado, or its variations; raspa, raspao, raspadinha (raspar is Spanish for "scrape"; hence raspado means "scraped", referring to the ice, therefore also meaning shaved), or granizado, granizada, granizo (from granizo, meaning hail stone).

==== North America and the Caribbean ====
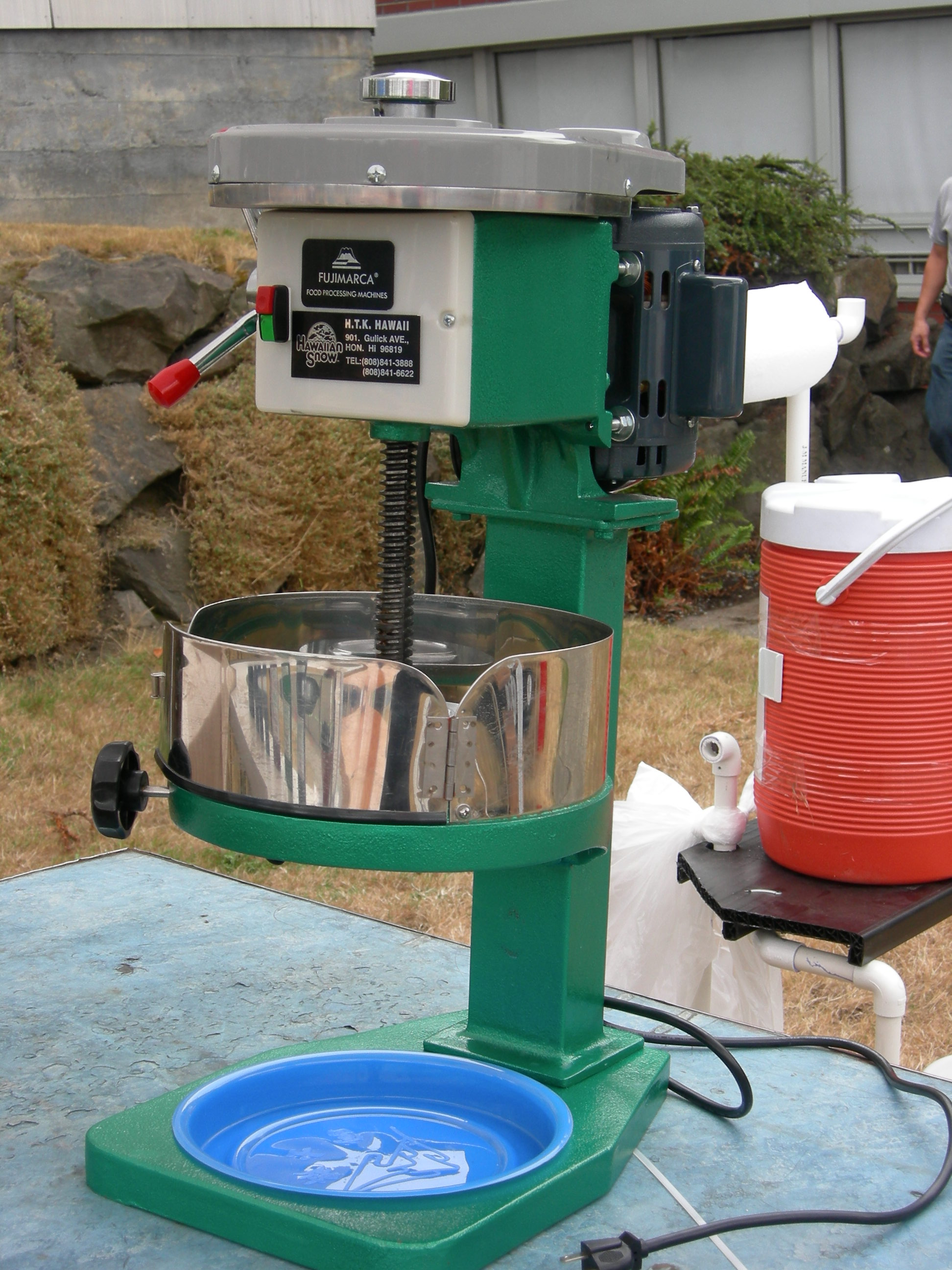
A machine used for shaving ice for shaved ice desserts.

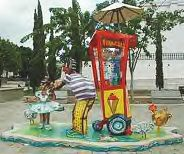
Artistic representation of a Piragua cart.

- In Canada and most of the contiguous United States, shaved ice, commonly known as "Snow cones" or "Snowballs", consist of crushed or shaved ice topped with sweet fruit flavored syrup. Within the United States, several regional variations are prominent: New Orleans snowballs include a topping of fruit flavored syrup or a fruit-cream syrup mixture, and Baltimore snowballs frequently include a fruit flavored syrup and are then topped additionally with marshmallow cream. A Sno-ball is the New Orleans variant. It can be served with syrup, ice cream, condensed milk, and a variety of toppings.
  - In the United States Virgin Islands (the American islands of St. Croix, St. Thomas, St. John, Water Island located in the Caribbean) a similar desert is called "fraco" (pronounced fray-co) -- sometimes spelled "fraico".

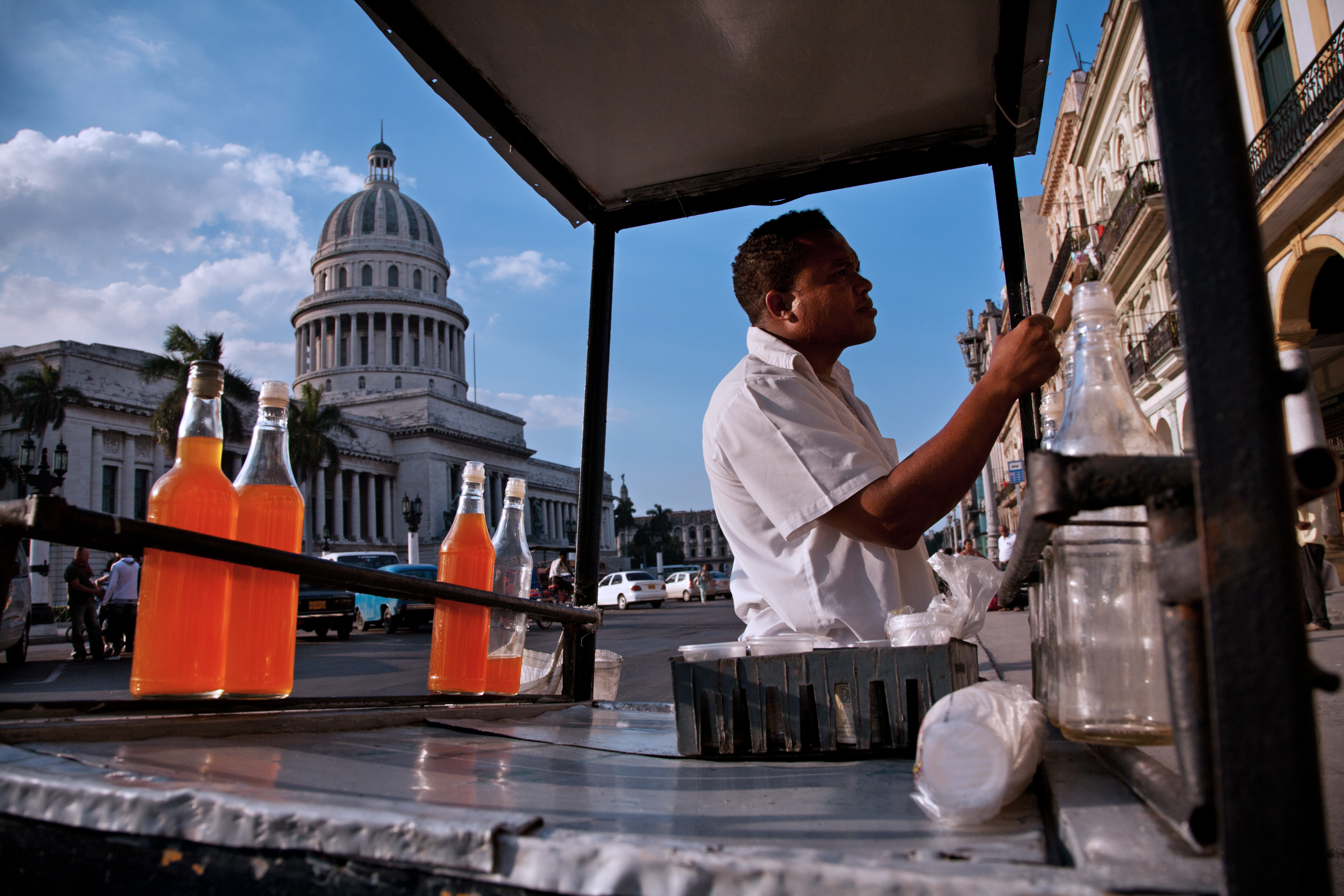
Granizado cart in Havana, Cuba

- In Cuba, as well as in many Cuban neighborhoods in the United States, shaved ice is known as granizados, after the Spanish word granizo for hailstones. In Miami, granizados are often sold in conjunction with other frozen confections in ice cream trucks and stands throughout the city. A classic Cuban flavoring for granizados is anise, made from extracts of the star anise spice.
- In the Dominican Republic and many Dominican neighborhoods, snow cones are called frío frío, with frío being the Spanish word for "cold", or alternately called Yun Yun.
- In Hawaii, they are known as "Hawaiian shave ice" or just "shave ice", and often resemble East Asian versions of shaved ice, with condensed milk, adzuki beans or mochi balls often added as toppings, while a scoop of vanilla ice cream is common at the bottom of the cone.
- In Mexico, as well as in some Spanish-speaking communities of the Southwestern United States, Texas, and California, a finely shaved and syruped ice is called a raspa, or raspado. Raspados come in a wide range of fruit flavors and classic Mexican flavors, including leche (sweetened milk with cinnamon), picosito (lemon and chili powder), chamoy (fruits and chili sauce, known as chamoyada), cucumber, guanabana, guava, pistachio, and tamarind.
- In most of Puerto Rico and many Puerto Rican neighborhoods, they are named piragua, because they are made in pyramid shapes and agua means water in Spanish. In western Puerto Rico towns such as Mayagüez, they are called raspao. Most Puerto Rican snow cone vendors use street snow cone carts instead of fixed stands or kiosks. During the summer months in Puerto Rican neighborhoods, especially in New York City and Philadelphia, "piragua" carts are often found on the streets and attract many customers.

===== US Brands =====
- Icee: brand-name product
- Slurpee: brand name
- Slush Puppie: brand name

==== Central and South America ====
- In Bolivia, they are known as shikashika, where the ice is collected from the nearby mountains.
- Mermelada con hielo (ice jam) is a local curiosity widely consumed in Rancagua, central Chile.
- In Colombia, Panama, Nicaragua, and Venezuela, they are called Raspados or Raspaos and are also topped with condensed milk and fruit flavors.

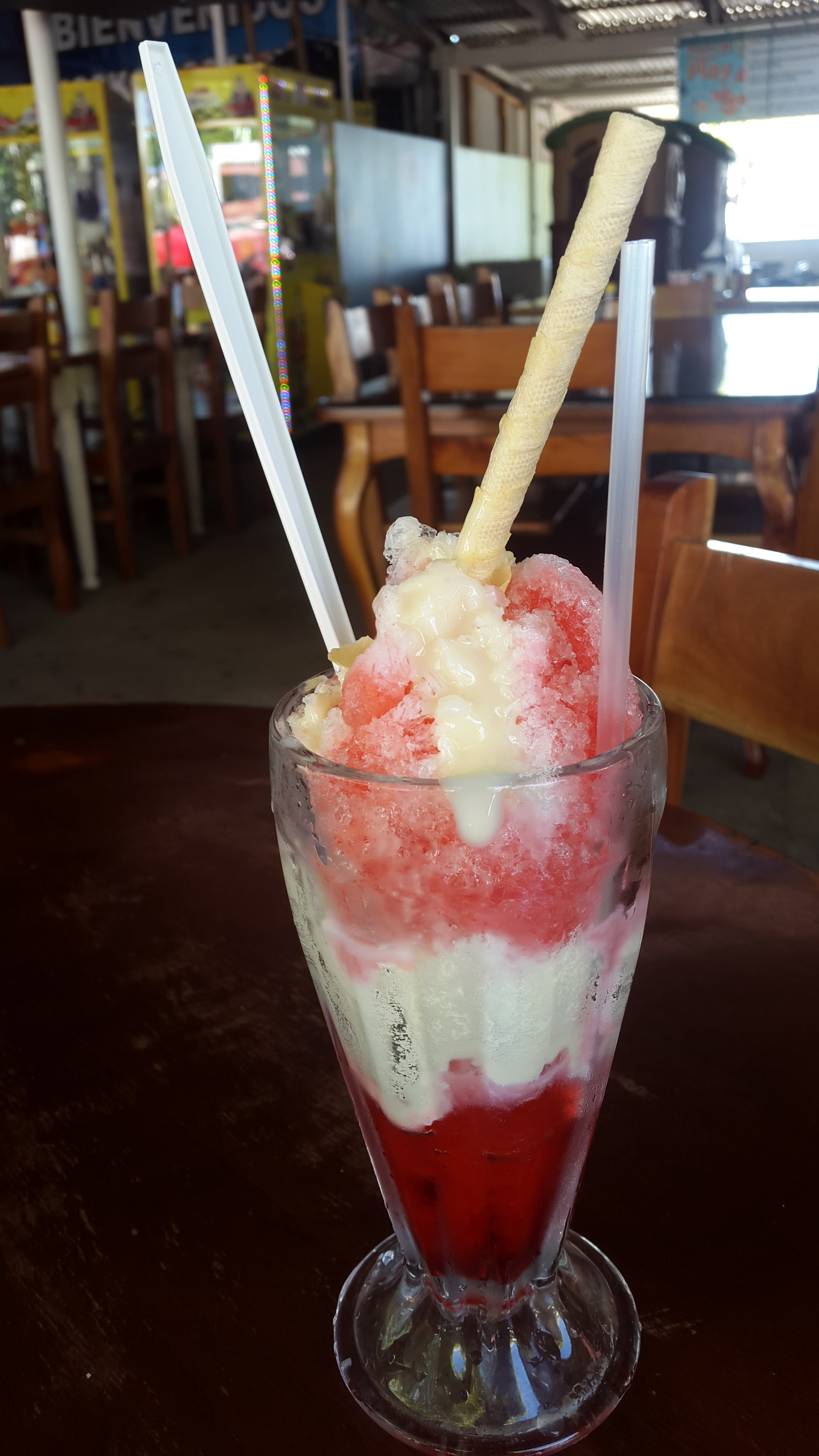
Churchill from Costa Rica made up of ice, syrup, condensed milk, powder milk, ice cream, tamarind, fruits, sponge cake filling.

- In Costa Rica, they are called granizados or copos (as in copos de nieve, translates to snowflake); in the Puntarenas Province when they have ice cream on the top, they are called "churchills".
- In Ecuador, there are three versions. The ones sold at street carts and having ice which has been shaved manually with a handheld tool resembling a wood hand plane are called raspados. The ones sold at street carts, having ice that has been frappéd with a manually actioned rotary machine (some sellers use the handheld shaver, instead) and are topped with condensed milk are called granizados. The granizados sold at stores are usually not topped and their ice is finely frappéd by an electrical machine and, for that reason, they will have more liquid even when just prepared. Raspados and granizados sold at streets are much cheaper than granizados sold at stores.
- In El Salvador and other countries of the region, they are known as minutas.
- In Guatemala and Belize, they are called granizada and are topped with condensed milk and fruit.
- In Honduras, they are called nieves and are also topped with condensed milk and fruit.
- In Guyana, they are known as "Crush Ice" or "Snow Cone" and are topped with condensed milk.
- In Peru, the confection is known as raspadilla and is often confused with cremolada. It is made with thick ground ice and topped with juices of different flavors that can be combined. The most common flavors are pineapple and strawberry, but it can also be served with berry juice, passion fruit juice, and purple corn juice (chicha morada). In some cases, though uncommon, it can be topped with condensed milk or yogurt. It is very popular on the beaches during summertime, and is also sold in the towns and cities from carts scattered throughout streets and avenues. Some vendors grind the ice from a block with a device or spoon with a blade like a razor at one end, others have the ice already ground and stored in a cooler. Raspadilla is prepared in a cup in front of the customer who then selects the flavor of juice to pour on top.
- In Brazil, they are known as raspa-raspa or raspadinha and in some parts of the country as Gelo ralado com groselha (redcurrant). Vendors grind the ice from a block with a device or spoon with a blade like a razor at one end. Common flavors, which can be combined, include strawberry, coconut, bubblegum, grape, mint, passion fruit and Tutti frutti.

=== Asia ===
==== East Asia ====
In East Asia, shaved ice desserts are not only flavoured with various types of syrup. It is also common to add solid ingredients such as red bean paste, jellies, canned fruits, jams, sweetened condensed milk, and many other types of sweetened foods to vary the textures of the ice dessert.

- According to The Pillow Book, in the 11th century, Japan had a dessert, shaved ice with kudzu juice. In Japan, the ice is known as kakigōri (かき氷; かきごおり) and topped with fruit flavoured or plain syrup. Some shops provide colorful varieties by using two or more different syrups. To sweeten Kakigōri, condensed milk is often poured on top of it. During the hot summer months, kakigōri is sold virtually everywhere in Japan. Some coffee shops serve it with ice cream, dango and red bean paste. Convenience stores may also sell it already flavored and packaged similar to ice cream.
- According to History of Song, in the 11th century, China had a dessert, 蜜沙氷, that is ice (氷) with red bean paste (沙) with honey (蜜). It is not certain that 蜜沙氷 is a shaved ice but in the 11th century, Japan had a shaved ice dessert, so there is a possibility that 蜜沙氷 is a shaved ice.
- In Korea, the shaved ices are known as bingsu (빙수). The variety topped with sweetened red beans is called pat-bingsu, with pat (팥) meaning "red bean". Toppings may also include fresh fruits and soybean powder. The earliest forms of bingsu existed during the Joseon dynasty (1392–1897). The government records show that the officials shared the crushed ices topped with various fruits, which were distributed from the ancient Korean ice storage called seokbinggo (Korean: 석빙고). Many other varieties can be found throughout the country. One variety that has been very popular in Korea since 2014 is snow flower bingsu (눈꽃빙수). It is made of extremely finely-shaved ice where the texture resembles real snow flakes. Also, rather than using plain ice, milk is added to the ice so that the shaved ice has milky flavor.
- In Taiwanese cuisine it is known as Tshuah-ping (剉冰; Taiwanese Hokkien) or "Bàobīng" (刨冰; Mandarin Pinyin). There are many varieties in Taiwan. Some of them are topped with canned fruits, fruits syrup and condensed milk. Other variations can be found throughout China. Originating from China in the 7th century, Baobing is one of the oldest variants of shaved ice treats. It is typically served in large portions with a variety of toppings. In Taiwan the dish also has a variation called xuehua bing (雪花冰), in which the ice is not made out of water but milk.

==== Southeast Asia ====
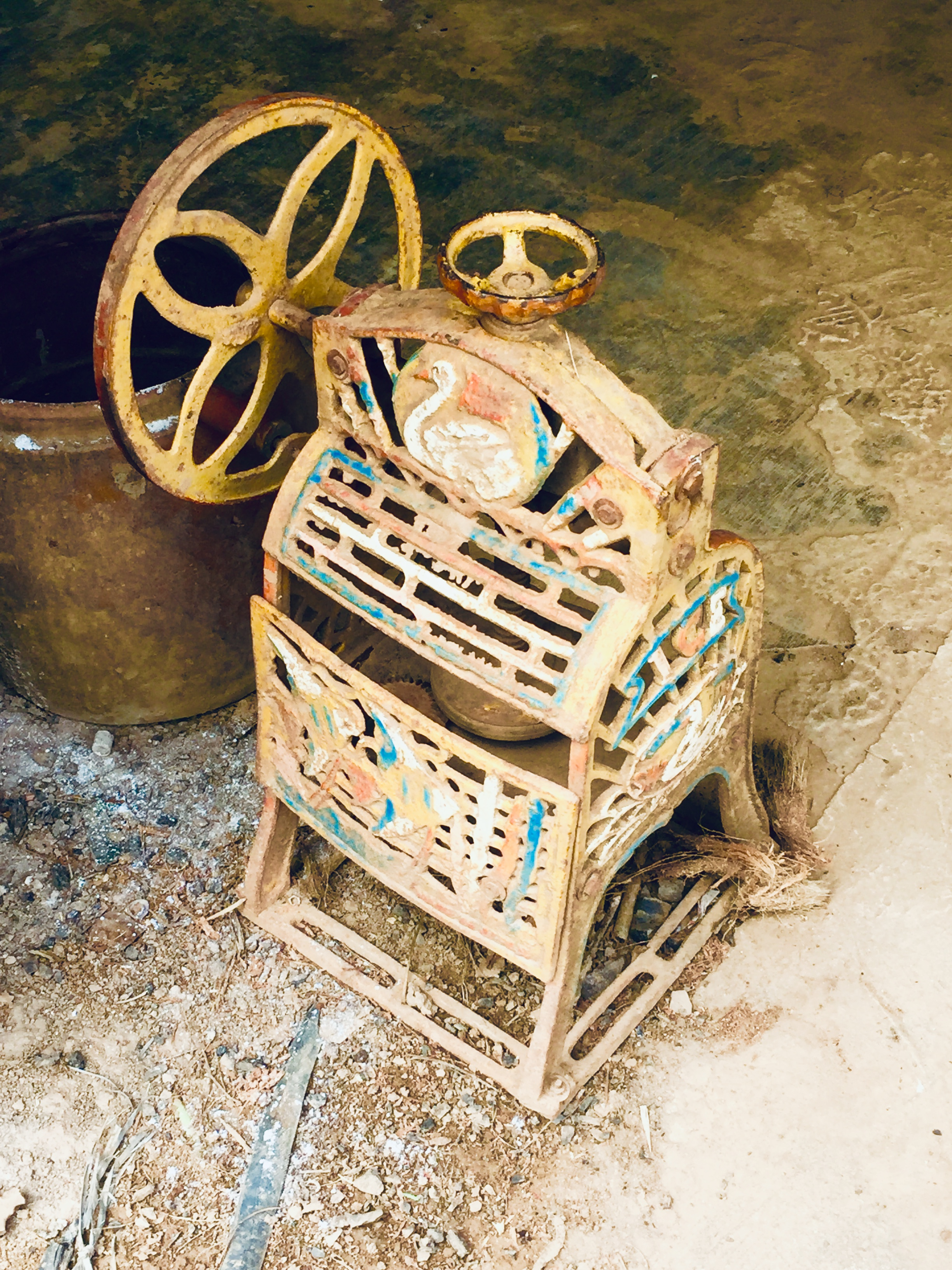
A rusty Swan Hand Crank Block Ice Shaver, kept in a storage room in Cambodia.

- In Cambodia, shaved ice known as Teuk Kork Chus (ទឹកកកឈូស), is usually served during the hot summer days and during Cambodian New Years. Tuk (ទឹក) translate to water, Kak (កក) translates to ice, and Chhous (ឈូស) translates to shaved. This dessert is served with a variety of fillings such as jelly, basil seeds, jackfruit, taro, red beans, and more. After the filling the shaved iced is then filled to the top, then customers can choose a choice of different colored syrups usually in green, red, or blue; and condensed milk will lastly layer the top of the shaved ice.
- In Malaysia and Singapore, it is known as ais kacang, which consists of shaved ice topped with sweetened syrup of various colours and flavours, condensed and evaporated milk, and sometimes also durian pulp or vanilla ice cream. Beneath the ice sweetened red beans, canned fruit, attap seeds and grass jelly are usually added. Electric ice shavers are often used, though some vendors may use a hand blade to shave the ice in order to produce a rough texture. A variation of this would be Cendol which is shaved ice with sweet green-coloured glutinous rice noodles drizzled with palm sugar; it is usually accompanied with kidney beans and canned sweetcorn.
- In Indonesia, it is known as es campur, which is similar to the Malaysian/Singaporean ais kacang.
- In the Philippines, the most prominent shaved ice dessert is known as halo-halo which consists of shaved ice topped with sweetened beans and fruits, creme caramel (leche flan), nata de coco and sometimes ice cream. Halo-halo is believed to be an indigenized version of the Japanese kakigori class of desserts, originating from pre-war Japanese migrants into the islands. The earliest versions were composed only of cooked red beans or mung beans in crushed ice with sugar and milk, a dessert known locally as "mongo-ya". Over the years, more native ingredients were added, resulting in the development of the modern halo-halo. Some authors specifically attribute it to the 1920s or 1930s Japanese migrants in the Quinta Market of Quiapo, Manila, due to its proximity to the now defunct Insular Ice Plant, which was the source of the city's ice supply. The term, properly spelled "haluhalo", literally means "mixed" in Tagalog. Halo-halo nowadays can have various toppings and can be differentiated by various regions in the Philippines. Other Philippine shaved ice deserts include mais con yelo, monggo con yelo and saba con yelo which are predecessors of halo-halo, and ice scramble which is shaved ice flavored with banana extract, colored pink or other colors, mixed with condensed or evaporated milk, and topped with powdered milk, chocolate syrup or other flavored syrups, and often other candy ingredients like mini-marshmallows and/or sprinkles.
- In Thailand, this kind of cold dessert is popularly known as namkhaeng sai (น้ำแข็งไส). Namkhaeng sai is served with a variety of toppings including red beans, toddy palm seeds, sticky rice, jellies, and preserved fruits, most often coconut. Then red syrup and condensed milk is liberally poured on top of the shaved ice. In other Thai desserts, the mixings are at the bottom and shaved ice is scooped on top. There are between 20 and 30 varieties of mixings that can be eaten. Among them are young coconut that has been soaked in coconut milk, black sticky rice, chestnuts, sweetened taro, red beans, sarim (thin strands of rice flour that is chewy and slippery) and many more.
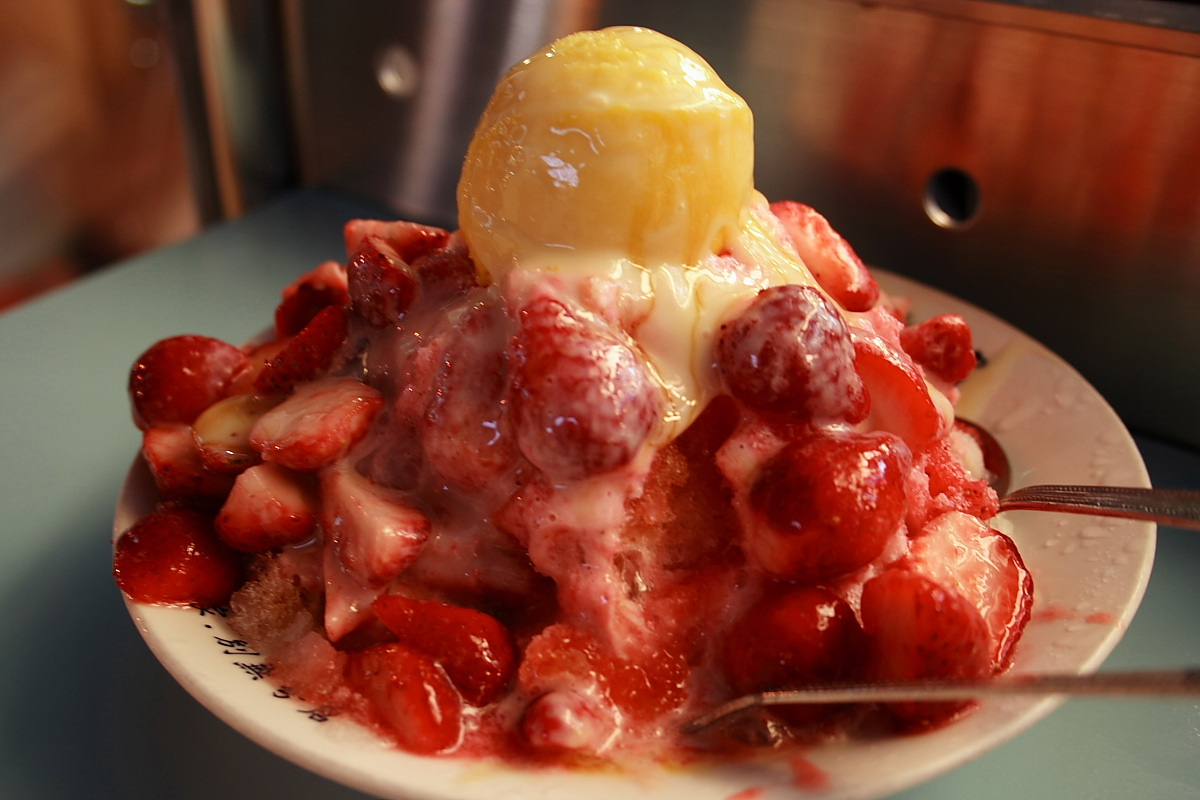
Taiwanese Baobing with strawberries and sweetened condensed milk

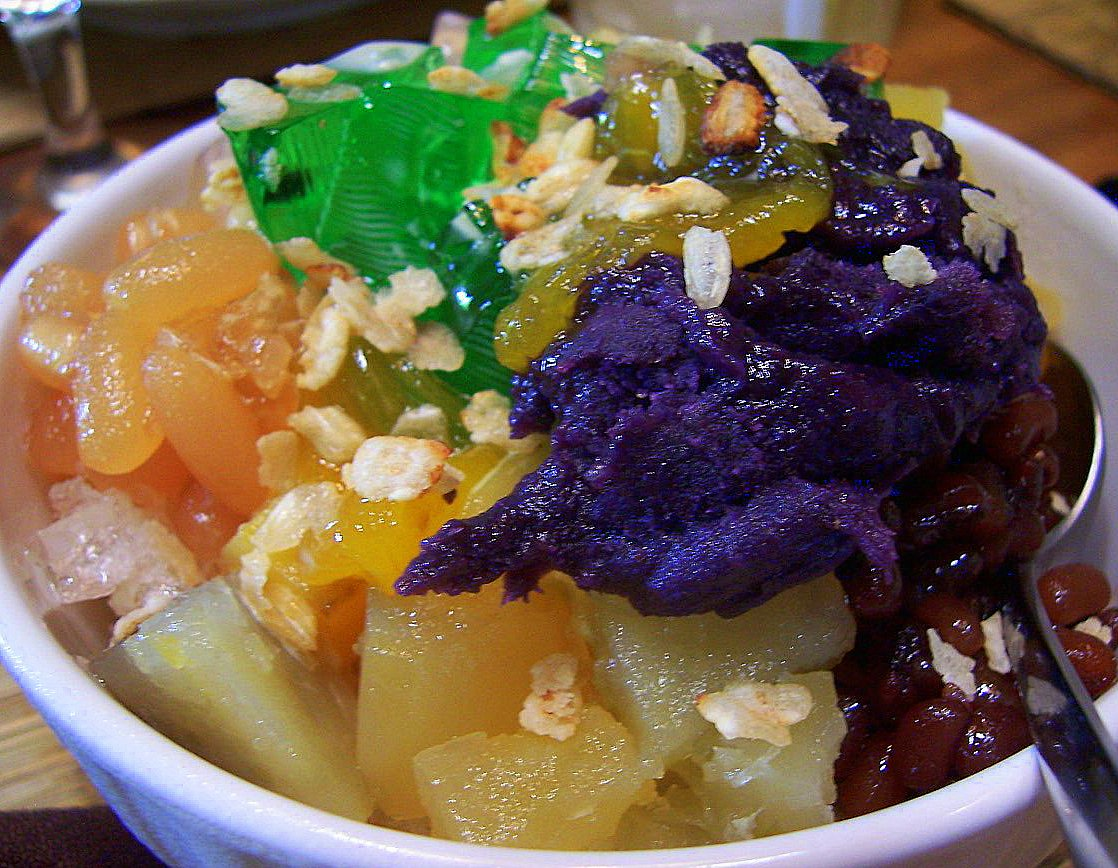
Filipino Halo--halò with brightly coloured toppings

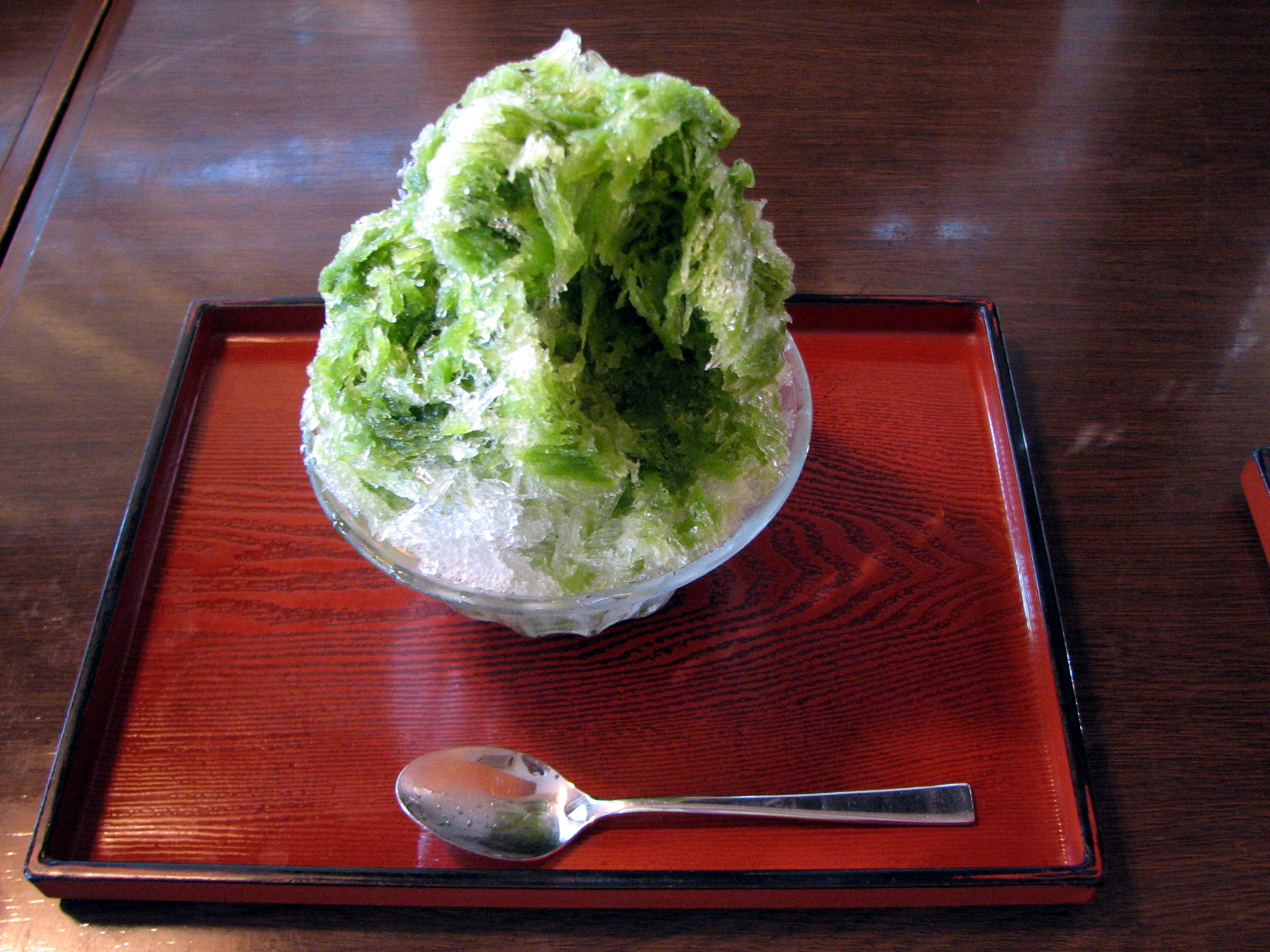
Japanese Kakigōri with green tea (matcha) flavoring

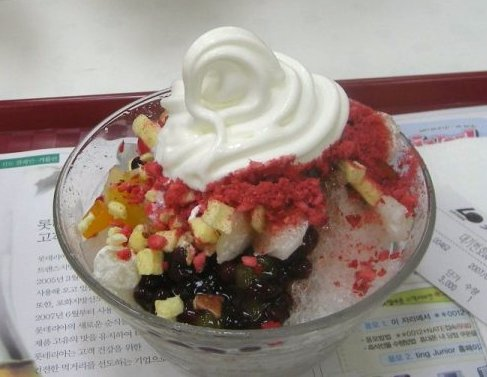
Korean Patbingsu with soft-serve ice cream and candied ingredients

==== South Asia ====
Shaved ice gola with milk cream, mawa and syrups, India.

In South Asia, snow cones are enjoyed as a low-cost summer treat, often shaved by hand.

- In India, known as gola or chuski; flavored with sugar syrups, fruit flavors, and several other regional flavors like rose, khus, or kala-khatta. It is often topped with condensed milk. A literal translation of "ball of ice" is used in many parts of India: Barfacha Gola in Marathi, Barf ka Gola in Hindi, and Barf no Golo in Gujarati.
- In Pakistan, it is often referred to as gola ganda (Urdu: گولا گنڈا), and it is flavored with multiple sugar syrups. fruits, condensed milk, ice cream, nuts, rosewater, and many other toppings. It is a very popular and well known street food.
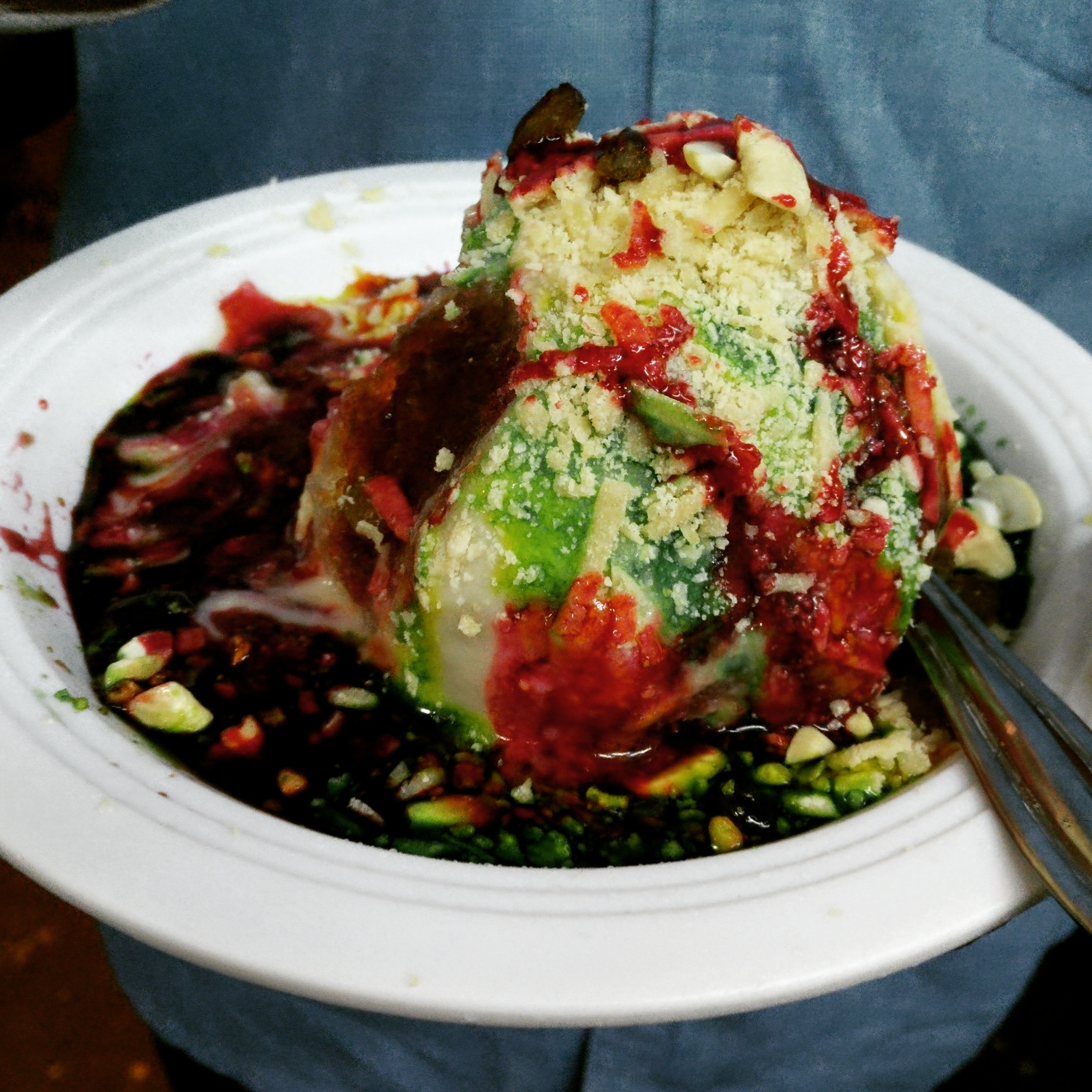
Gola with black kala-khatta syrup, jelly, cream

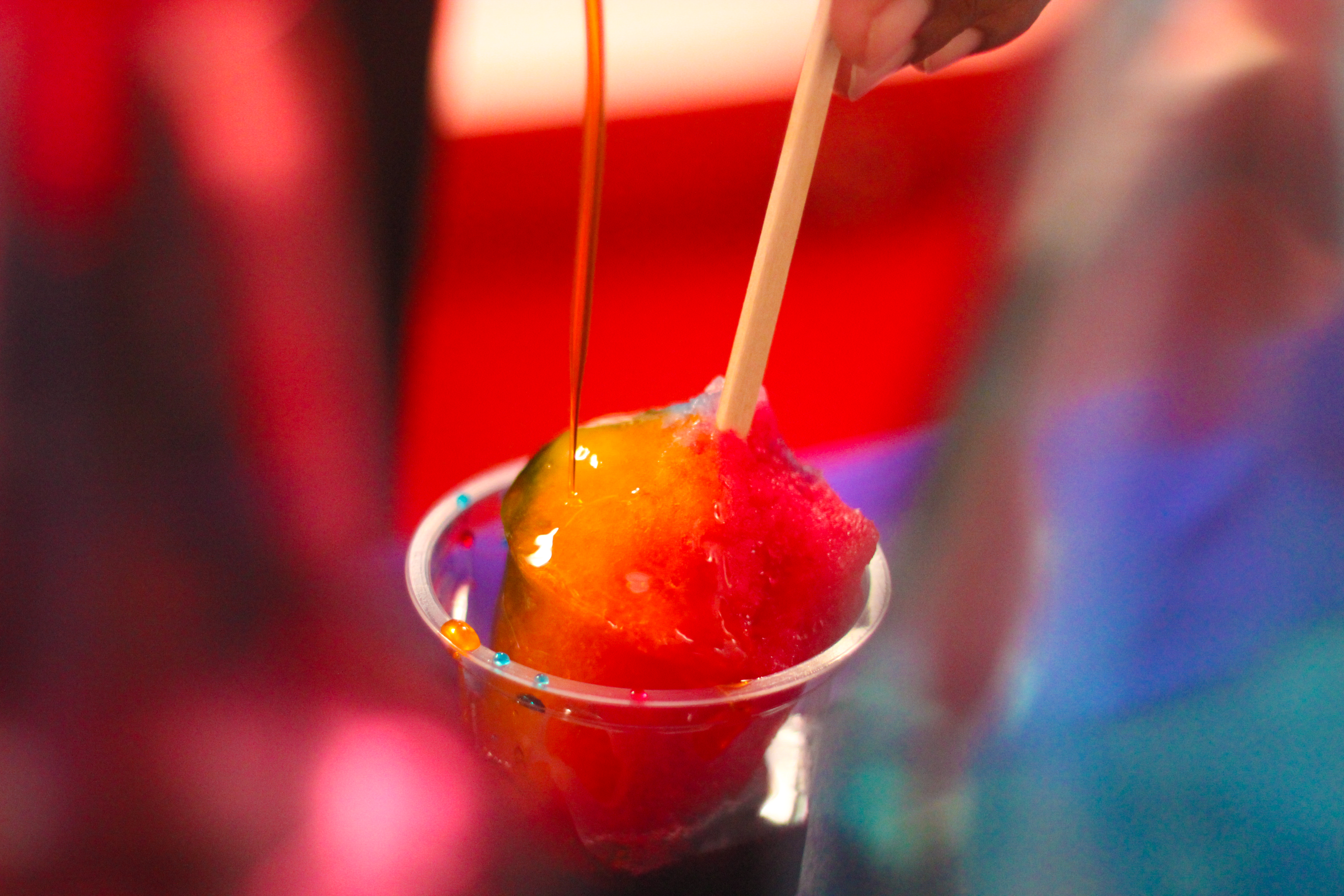
Shaven ice sold in the streets of India

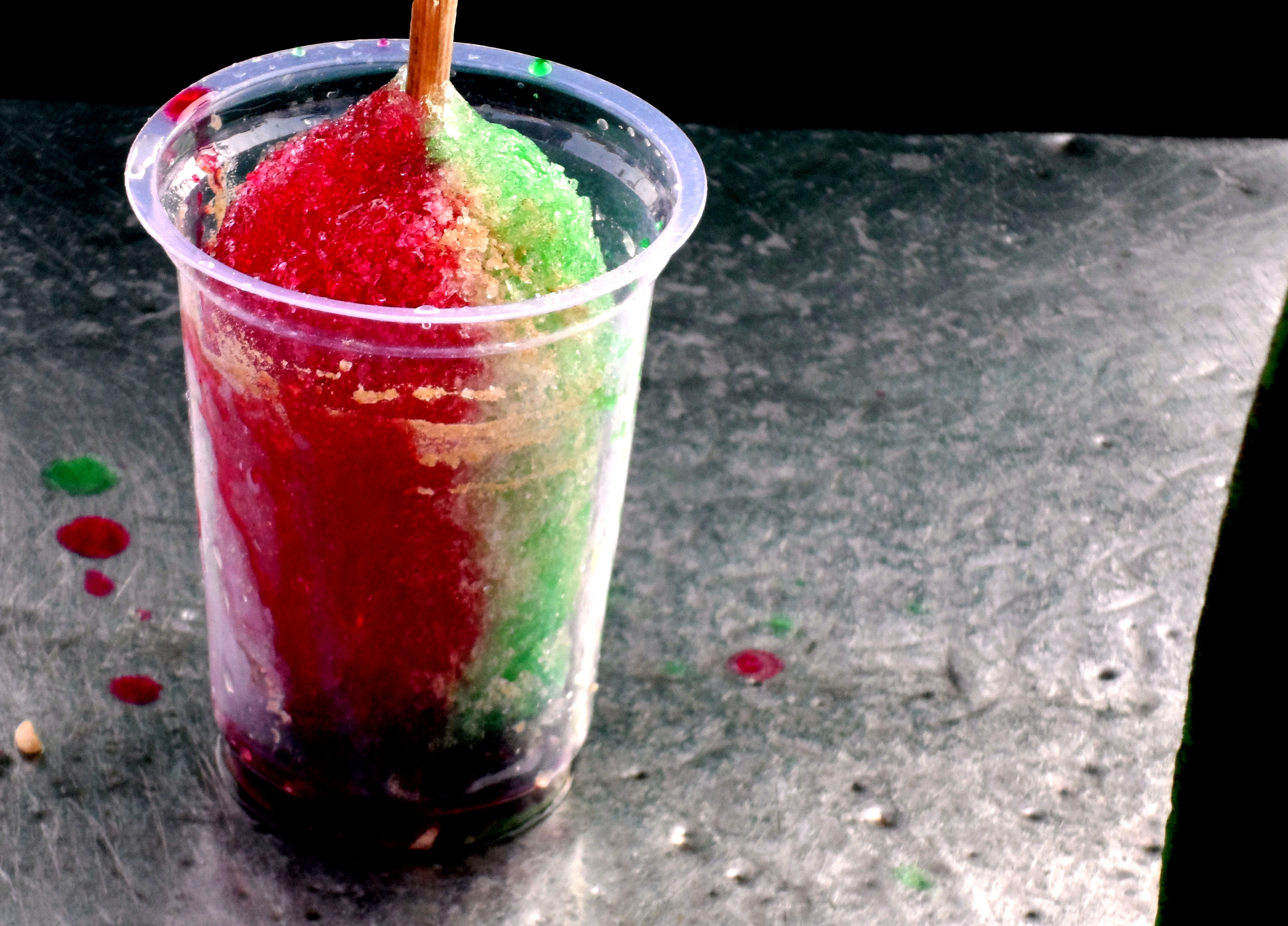
Crushed Ice with flavored syrups in India

==== Middle East ====
- In Turkey, bici bici is the most known summer dessert. It is very light. Generally, ices are brought from the Toros Mountains to the city center. Bici bici contains starch, home-made syrup, and optionally banana.

=== Europe ===
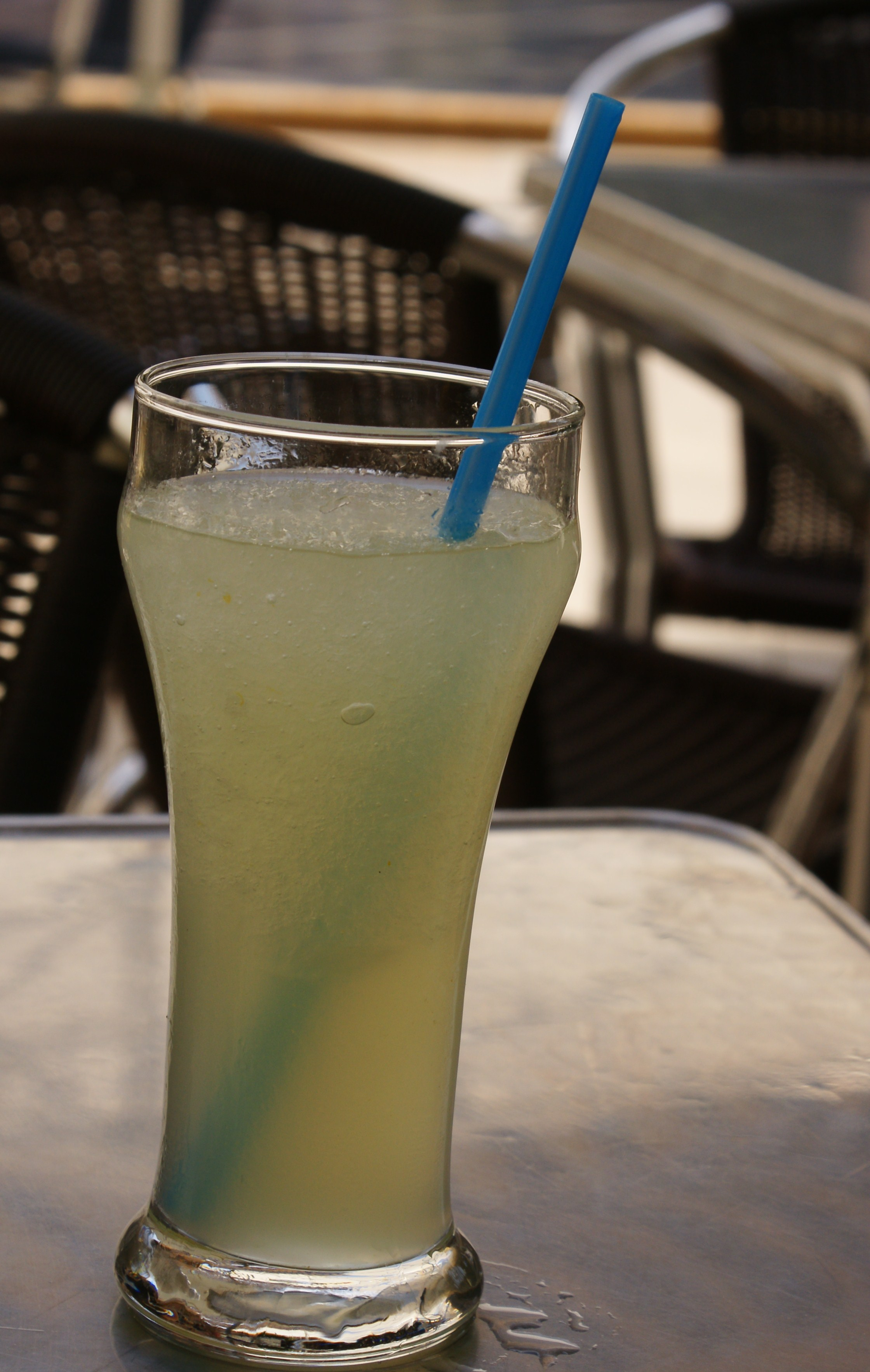
Lemon granizado in Valencia

- In Italy, a variation is called grattachecca in Rome, or Granita in Sicily.
- In France, this dessert is called granité hawaïen.
- In Spain, they are called granizado and are served as a drink with lemon juice.
- In Britain, the term snowball is sometimes used, however it refers to a different treat. The slush is similar, though more for drinking than eating, and both are common in the UK. They are often served in the same places as ice creams.

== Drinks ==
When large quantities of liquids are added to shaved ice, shaved ice drinks are produced

- Raspado – Mexican shaved ice drink
- Sâm bổ lượng, South Chinese, and Vietnamese shaved ice drink/soup with jellies and fruits
- Cendol, South East Asian drink usually containing shaved ice

== See also ==
- Maple taffy: Quebec and New England treat of boiled maple sap poured on snow
- Snow cream: a cream or snow and dairy-based dessert
