= Tenkomori =

Japanese term for heaped food

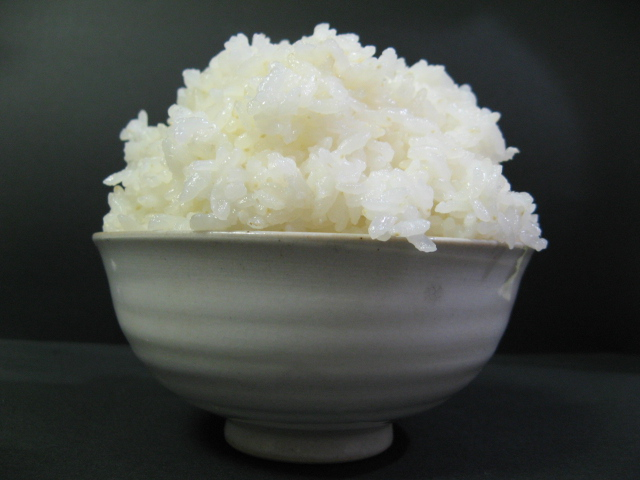
Cooked rice

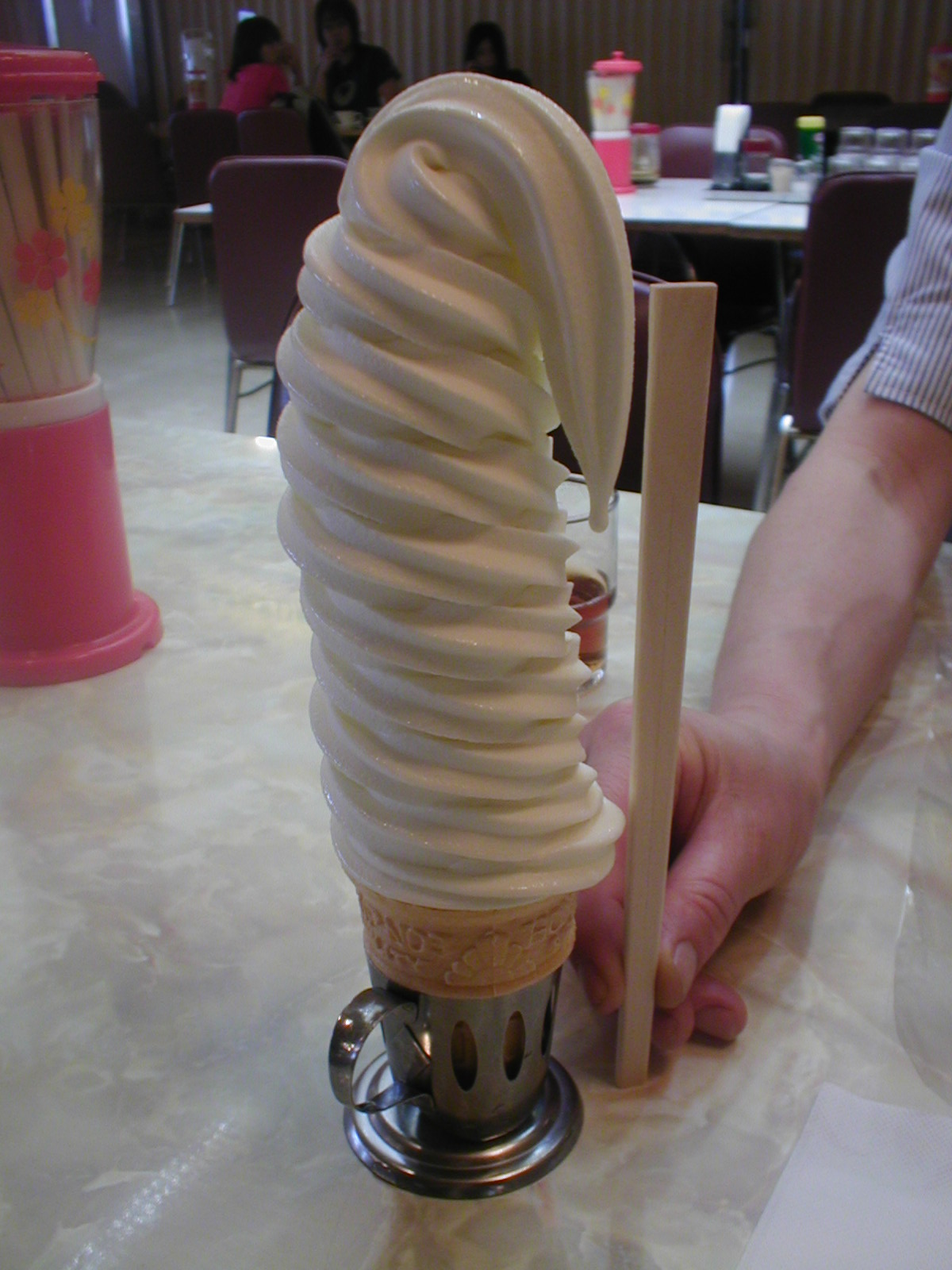
Soft ice

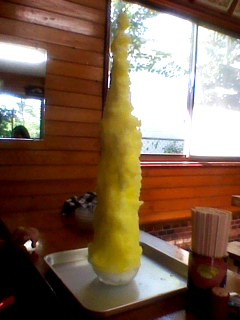
Kakigōri

Tenkomori(天こ盛り、てんこもり) is to the act of piling up food high in dishes and other containers (creating a mound or heap). It can also refer to the appearance of such a piled-up dish. It is synonymous with ''yamamori'' (山盛り) and ''tekomori'' (てこもり). Figuratively, it can be used to describe a situation where there is an abundance of something with a positive connotation. When food is served with more than the usual amount, it is called "oomori" (大盛り).

In manga, it is common to depict rice served in this manner in bowls or Chawan dishes, and it is sometimes referred to as manga mori (マンガ盛り). Dekamori is also used as a synonymous term. Additionally, there is a term called mukashibanashi mori (昔ばなし盛り) or mukashibanashi mori (昔話盛り).

== Etymology ==
The term tenko in tenkamori is derived from the abbreviation of the word tenkotsu (天骨) written in kanji, which is a dialect used in the Hokuriku, Kansai, Chugoku, and Shikoku regions, meaning the top of a mountain or the upper part of the sky. Variants such as tekko or tekkyo are not limited to western Japan but are also found in Gunma and Fukushima. From there, tenko mori (天骨盛り) came to mean "piled up high like the peak of a mountain".

In addition, word tenkotsu (天骨) now means the inherent nature or natural talent, representing someone's innate abilities or talents. Tenkochinai (てんこちない) is a phrase from the past meaning "unexpected" or "unbelievable."

== Related terms ==
Other related terms include tenmori (天盛り), which refers to toppings like nori (seaweed), ginger, sesame, or buds of a tree used in dishes like vinegar dishes, salads, and simmered dishes to add color and flavor.
