= Shikashika =

Shaved ice drink

- Course: Dessert
- Place of origin: Peru and Bolivia
- Main ingredients: Glacier ice

Shikashika is a shaved ice drink made from glacier ice in Peru and Bolivia. In some rural communities, the extraction and sale of ice continues to be a primary natural resource for local economies. Ice merchants extract the blocks with an axe by hand and transport them down from the mountains atop mules. The unit of sale is usually an ice block weighing approximately 40 kilograms which is sold to Shikashika vendors. Shikashika is sold in plastic bags with colorful sweet syrups at Andean festivals and on market day.

The word shikashika is onomatopoeia from the Amerindian language Quechua. An alternative word for Shikashika in Spanish is raspadilla.

== Documentary films ==
In 2008 Huaraz Satyricon Cinema produced a documentary film about a Shikashika business in the Andean Highlands. Filmed in Peru, the documentary reveals the process of making a colorful shave ice. To make it one family must journey into the Andes Mountains where they cut enormous blocks of ice with an axe and bare hands. The following day Shikashika is sold at the steps of a cathedral in the valley far below. The film offers a rare and focused glimpse into life and work in the Peruvian highlands.
