= Kakigōri =

Japanese shaved ice dessert

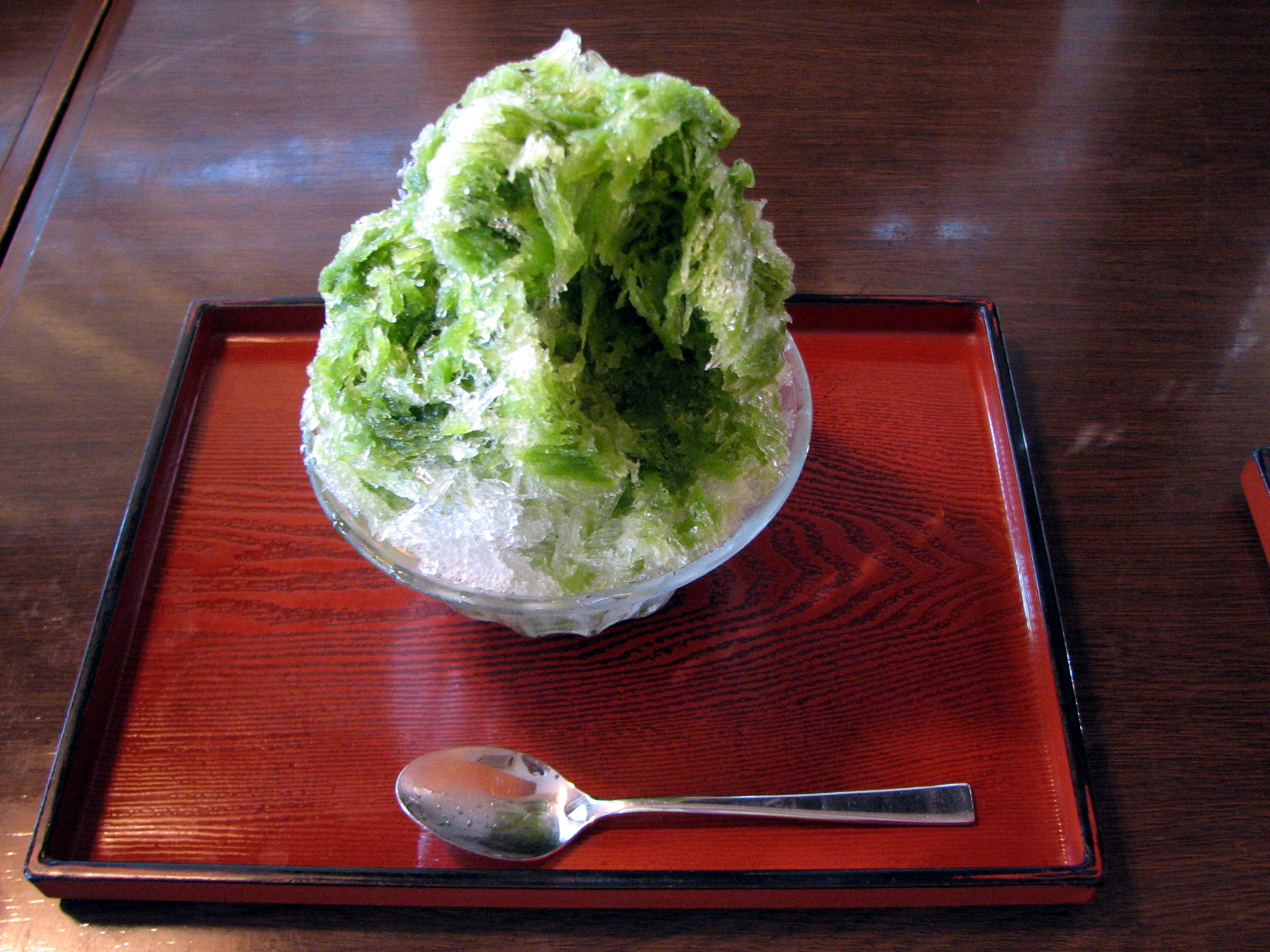
- Kakigōri with green tea flavor
- Type: Shaved ice
- Course: Dessert
- Place of origin: Japan
- Main ingredients: Ice, syrup, condensed milk or evaporated milk
- Variations: Shirokuma

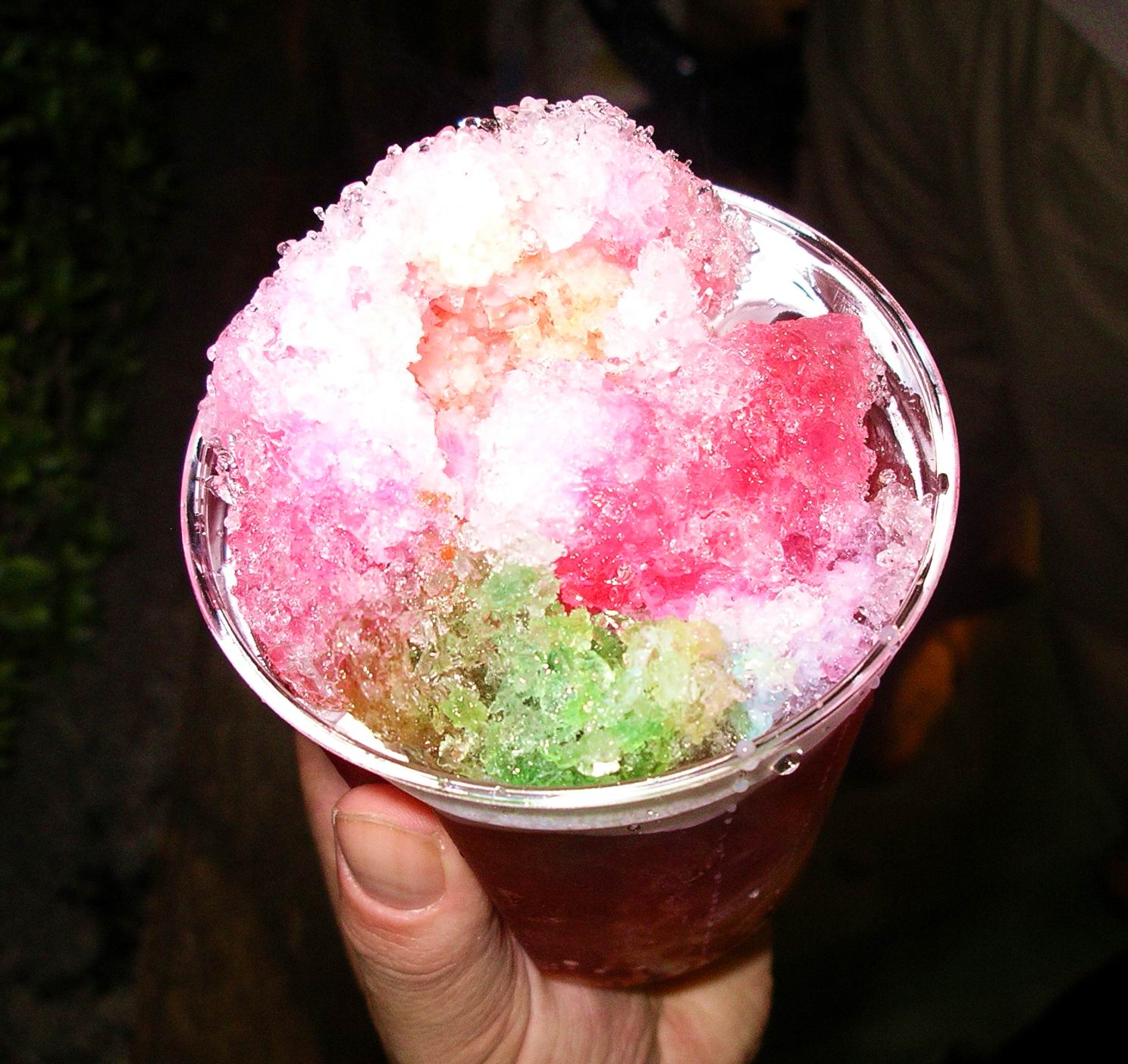
Kakigōri

Kakigōri (かき氷) is a Japanese shaved ice dessert flavored with syrup and a sweetener, often condensed milk.

== History ==
The origins of kakigōri date back to the Heian period in Japanese history, when blocks of ice saved during the colder months would be shaved and served with sweet syrup to Japanese aristocracy during the summer. Kakigōri's origin is referred to in The Pillow Book, a book of observations written by Sei Shōnagon, who served the Imperial Court during the Heian period. Kakigōri became more accessible in the 19th century, when ice became more widely available to the public during the summertime. The first kakigōri store is believed to have opened in Yokohama in 1869.

July 25 is known as kakigōri day in Japan because of its pronunciation sounding similar to summer ice in Japanese. Another reasoning for July 25 being kakigōri day is because, on that day in 1933, there was a record high temperature in Japan.

== Description ==
The traditional way of making kakigōri uses a hand cranked machine to spin a block of ice over a shaving blade. Even though electric shavers are most often used, street vendors can still be seen hand-shaving ice blocks in the summer.

Rather than flavored ice, Kakigōri is traditionally made of pure ice, in many cases, being a frozen block of mineral water. The ice used is often taken from natural springs, afterward being tempered to achieve an ideal quality for shaving. Prior to refrigeration, mountain caves or ice houses would be the traditional way of storing kakigōri ice.

It is similar to a snow cone but with some notable differences: It has a much smoother fluffier ice consistency, much like fresh fallen snow, and a spoon is almost always used to eat it. The texture of the ice distinguishes kakigōri from other types of shaved ice desserts. Due to this textural difference, it has also been seen translated as 'Angel Snow'.

Popular flavors include strawberry, cherry, lemon, green tea, grape, melon, "Blue Hawaii", sweet plum, and colorless syrup. Some shops provide colorful varieties by using two or more syrups. To sweeten kakigōri, condensed or evaporated milk is often poured on top of it.

Kakigōri banner with the kanji for “ice” (氷)

In addition to street stalls, kakigōri is sold in festivals, convenience stores, coffee shops, specialized kakigōri parlors, and restaurants. It's also frequently prepared by families at home. During the hot summer months, kakigōri is sold virtually everywhere in Japan. Especially at summer festivals and fairs such as matsuri and bon odori festivals, often served alongside other street foods such as yakisoba, takoyaki and cotton candy. Kakigōri is one of the summer features in Japan. Some shops serve it with ice cream and sweetened red beans or tapioca pearls.

A flag with the kanji sign for ice kōri (氷) is a common and traditional way for an establishment to indicate that they are serving kakigōri.

== Shirokuma ==
Shirokuma
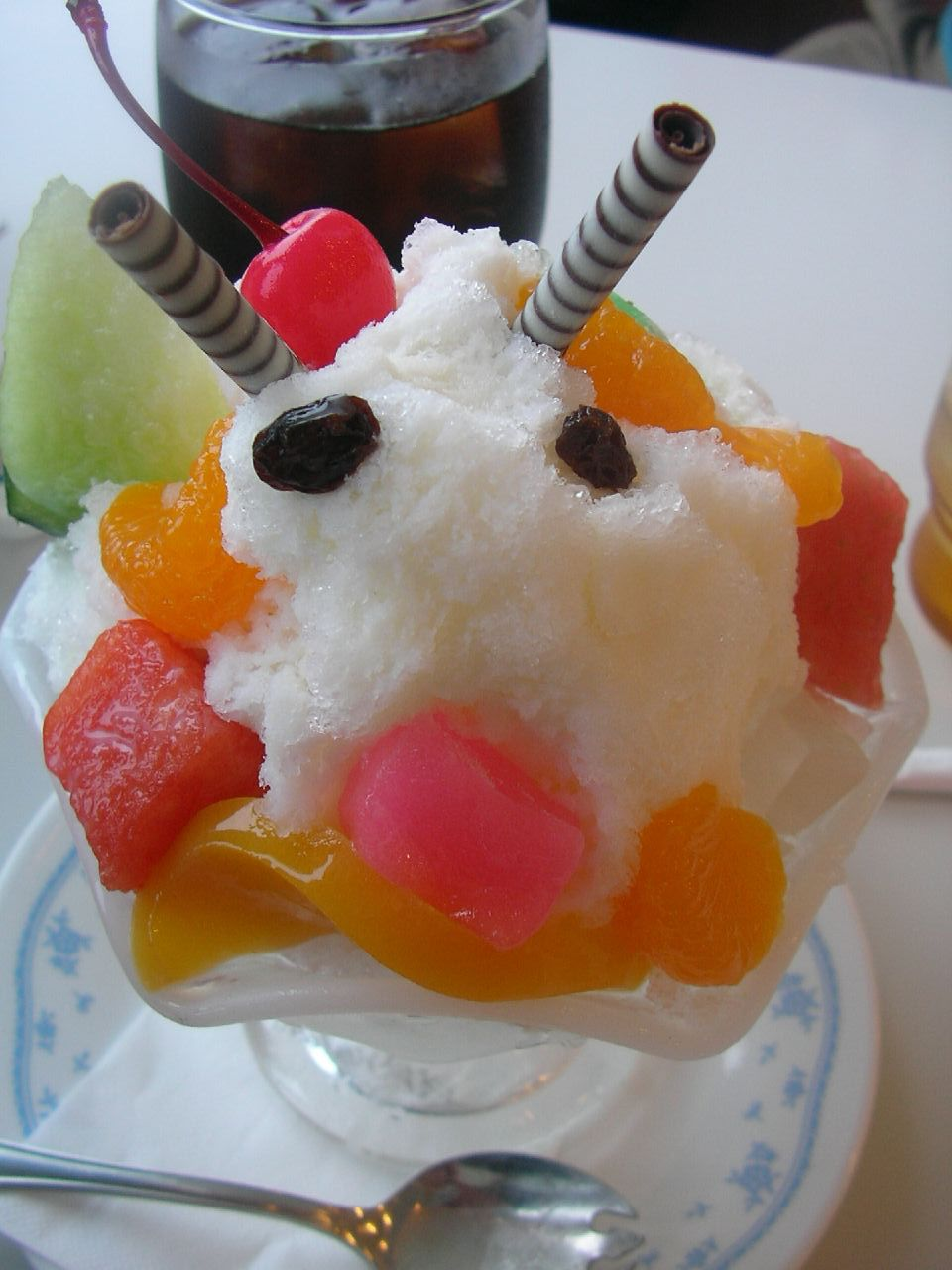
- Type: Kakigōri
- Course: Dessert
- Place of origin: Japan
- Region or state: Kagoshima prefecture
- Main ingredients: Ice, condensed milk

Shirokuma (白熊 or しろくま), is a type of kakigōri. Shirokuma is made with shaved ice flavored with condensed milk, small colorful mochi, fruits, and sweet bean paste (usually Azuki bean). Mandarin oranges, cherries, pineapples, and raisins are often used to make shirokuma.

=== Description ===
Shirokuma has been popular in Kagoshima since the middle of the Edo period and is well known to many Japanese. Condensed milk, fruit, and sweet bean paste are served over shaved ice. It is eaten in cafés and in some department stores, such as Yamakataya (山形屋) or Mujaki.

=== Etymology ===
Shirokuma literally means "white bear" and indicates "polar bear" in Japanese. There are some views about the origin of the name.

In one account, there was a cotton shop in Kagoshima city. The shop started to sell kakigōri as its side-business. The kakigōri was flavored with condensed milk. When the owner was thinking of a name for it, he noticed the picture of a polar bear was printed on the labels of the condensed milk's can.

Another account is that Mujaki, a coffee shop in Kagoshima City, started to sell the kakigōri, put milk syrup, sanshoku-kanten (colorful agar), yōkan (soft azuki-bean jelly), sweet beans and fruits in a pattern that resembled a polar bear when seen from overhead, so it was named shirokuma.

Yet others say that it was created in honour of the memory of Saigo Takamori after his battle with the Edo Shogun.

In Kagoshima, some similar named kakigōri are made. Kurokuma flavored with dark brown unrefined sugar syrup, coffee or caramel syrup and kiguma flavored with mango pulp syrup are made in some coffee shops.

=== Availability ===
Supermarkets in southern Kyushu, especially in Kagoshima City, Kagoshima, and mom-and-pop candy stores sell shirokuma as a popular product. Shirokuma are often eaten at Kagoshima fairs which are held in other prefectures. Shirokuma in cups are sold at convenience stores all over Japan. One of the brands found in stores, Marunaga Seika, received the Long Seller Award for their continuing work in enriching the Shirokuma distribution. The brand launched their Shirokuma product in 1972.

== Ujikintoki ==
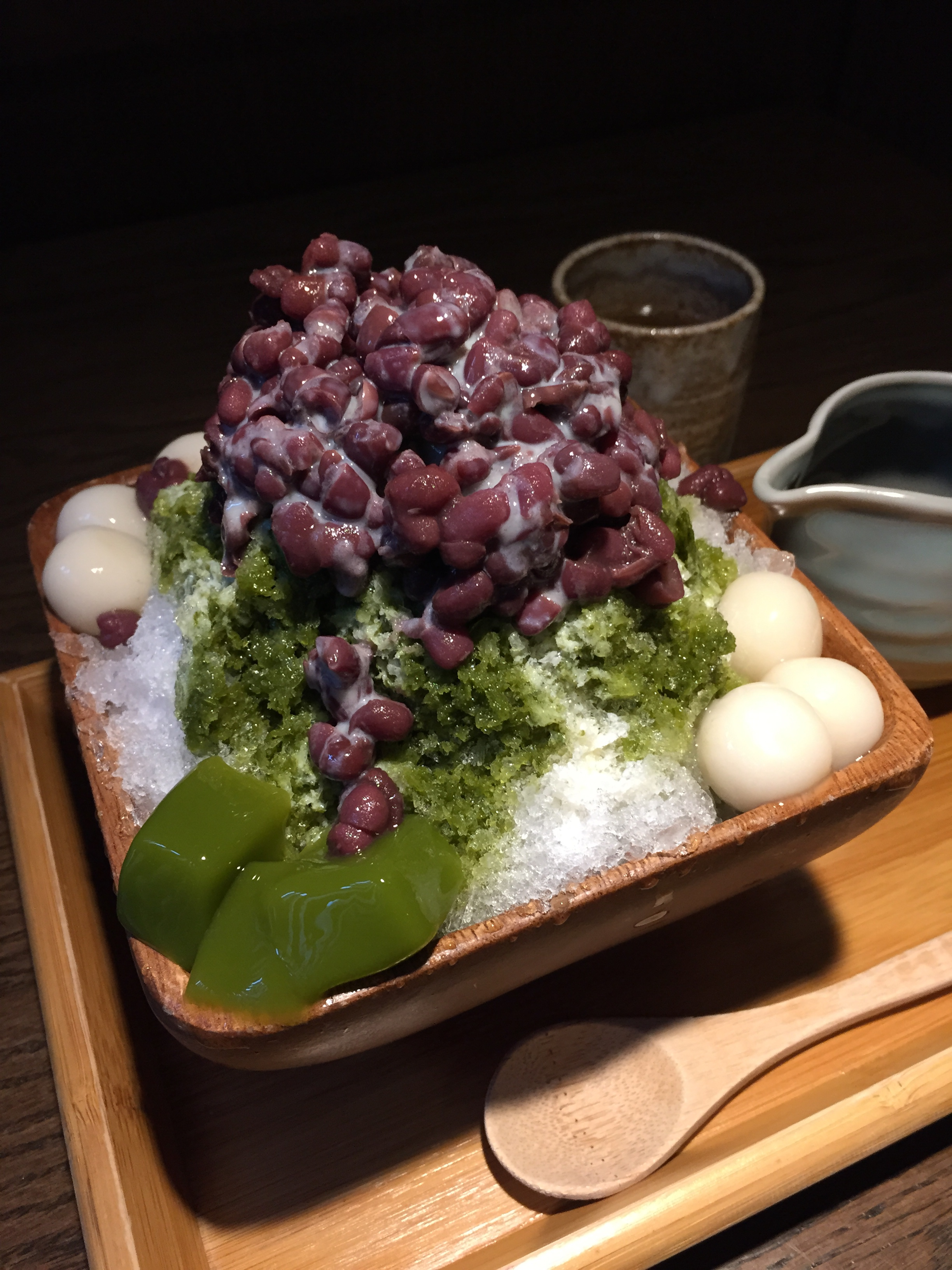
Ujikintoki

Ujikintoki (宇治金時 or うじきんとき) is a type of Kakigōri that is made from shaved ice, flavored green tea syrup, sweet bean paste (Azuki bean), mochi, and green tea ice cream (抹茶アイスクリーム, Matcha aisu kurīmu).

=== Etymology ===
Ujikintoki is named after the small city of Uji, in Kyoto Prefecture, famous for its green tea and Sakata Kintoki, who is known as Kintarō in Japanese folklore. Kintoki is the red bean paste that is named after Kintarō's face usually being depicted as red.

== Other varieties ==
=== Yakigori ===
Yakigori (焼き氷) is a type of Kakigōri where liquor, often brandy is poured on top and then lit on fire. Yakigori occasionally has caramel sauce, ice cream, strawberries, or pineapple on top.

== See also ==
- Kōrikoppu: The dedicated glassware which was mainly used for Kakigōri before World War II. (氷コップ)

=== Similar dishes in other cultures ===
- Tshuah-ping: Taiwanese shaved ice
- Bingsu: Korean shaved ice
- Granita: Sicilian shaved ice
- Halo-halo: Filipino shaved ice (derived from Kakigori)
- Es campur and Es teler: Indonesian shaved ice
- Namkhaeng sai and O-aew: Thai shaved ice
- Ais Kacang (ABC): Malaysian shaved ice
- Grattachecca: Italian shaved ice popular in Rome
- Hawaiian shave ice: Hawaiian shaved ice
- Raspado: Mexican shaved ice
