= Churchill (snow cone) =

Costa Rican dessert

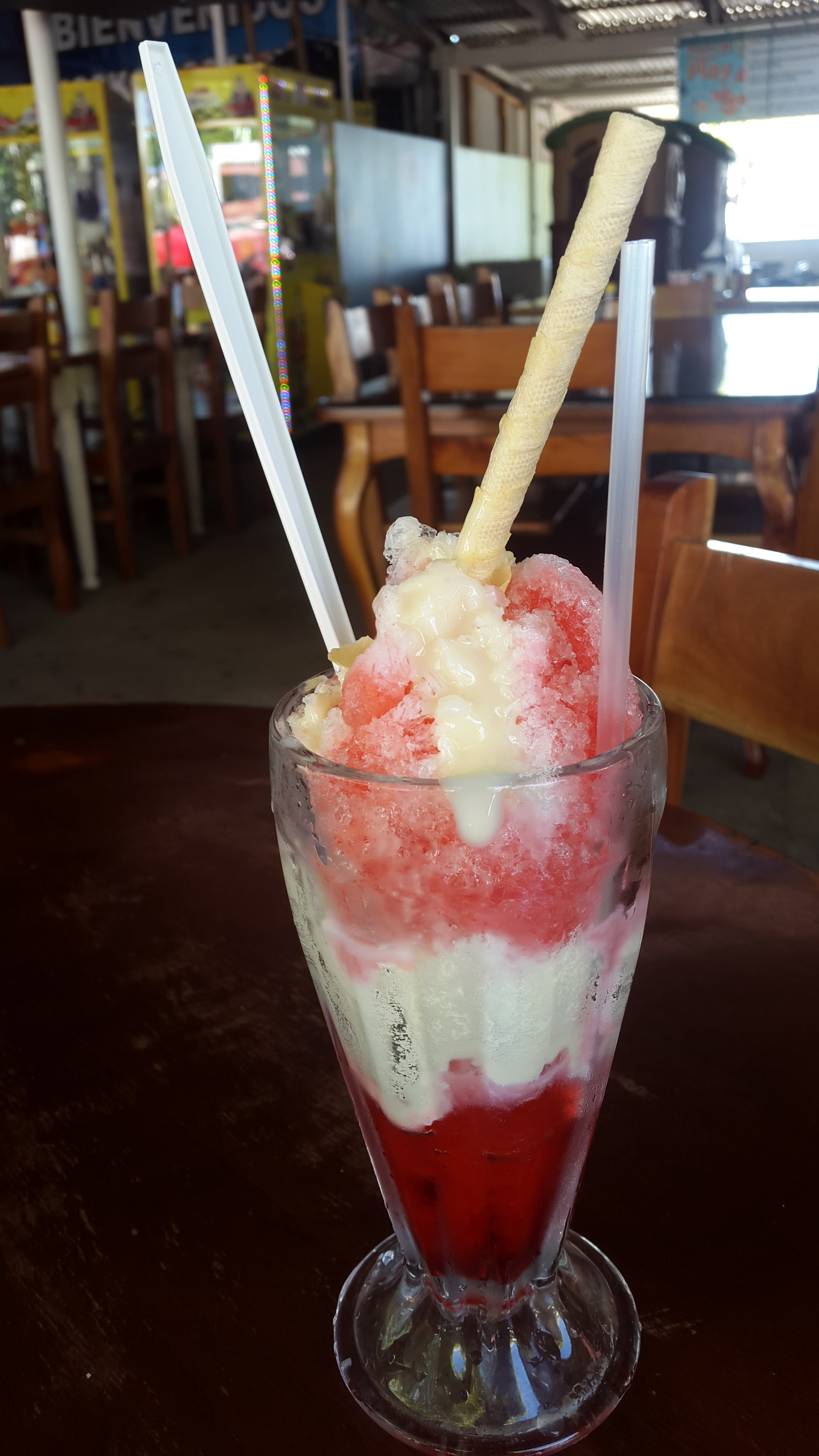
Churchill made up of ice, syrup, condensed milk, powder milk, ice cream, tamarind, fruit, cake filling.

Churchill is a very popular snow cone from Costa Rica.

The first Churchills were served in the city of Puntarenas. According to tradition, in the 1940s there was a local businessman named Joaquín Agüilar Ezquivel, aka "Quinico", who used to go to the Paseo de los Turistas; there he purchased a snow cone with different ingredients. Ice cream sellers considered those ingredients very exotic, so they decided to name the combination "Churchill", because Mr Quinico looked like the British politician Sir Winston Churchill.
