= Snow cone =

Ground ice dessert

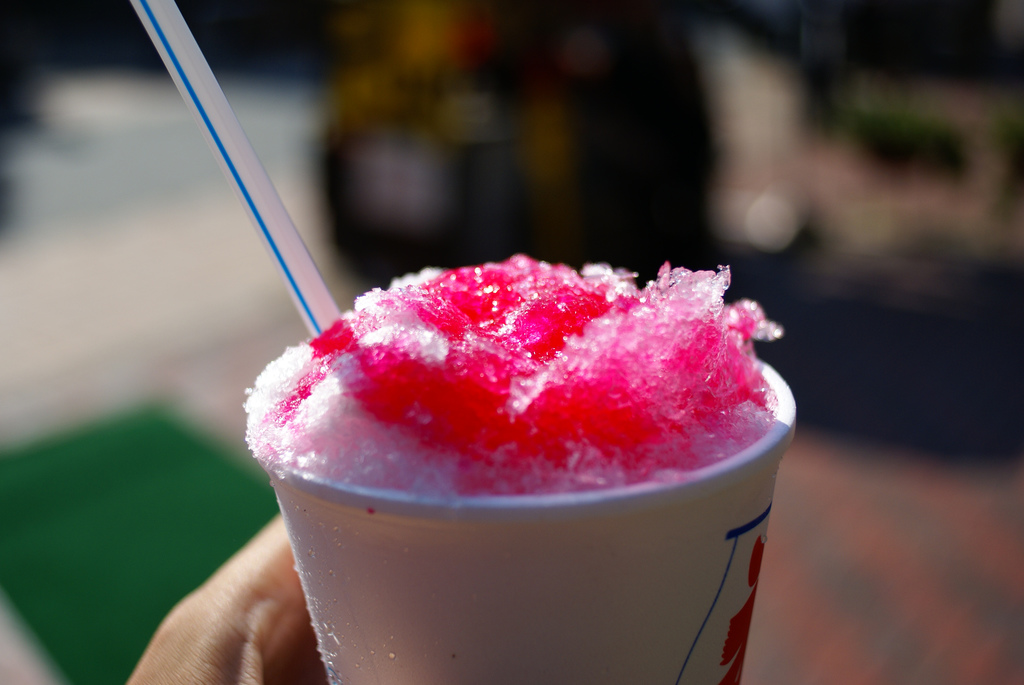
- Course: Dessert
- Variations: Granita

A snow cone (or snow kone, sno kone, sno-kone, sno cone, or sno-cone) is a ground-up ice dessert commonly served in paper cones or foam cups. This is not to be confused with shaved ice which shaves a thin layer of ice off an ice block instead of grinding or crushing ice. The dessert consists of ice grounds that are topped with flavored sugar syrup.

Depending on the region of North America, the terms snowball, ice cone and snow cone may refer to different things. Where the distinction is made, snowball refers to a dessert made of finely ground ice ("like soft fresh snow"), while a snow cone contains ground-up ice that is coarser and more granular ("crunchy").

== History ==
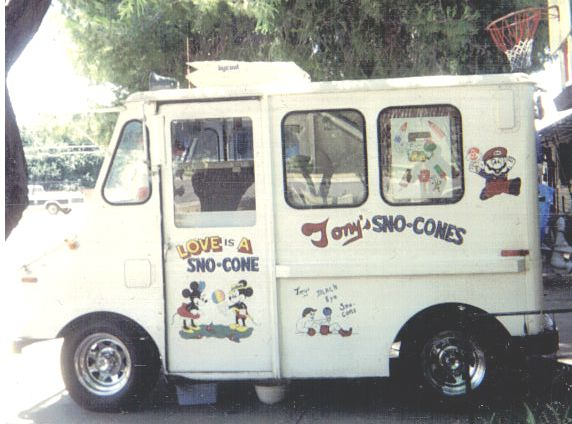
Snow cone vending truck in Arizona

=== Industrial Revolution ===
In the 1850s, the American Industrial Revolution made ice commercially available in the United States. Ice houses in New York would commonly sell ice to states like Florida. To transport the ice to Florida, the ice houses would send a wagon with a huge block of ice south. The route to Florida would pass right through Baltimore where children would run up to the wagon and ask for a small scraping of ice. Before long, mothers started to make flavoring in anticipation of their children receiving some ice. The first flavor the women made is still a Baltimore favorite: egg custard. Egg custard was an easy flavor to make as the only ingredients were eggs, vanilla, and sugar.

=== Theaters ===
By the 1870s, the snow cone's popularity had risen to the degree that in the warm summer months, theaters would sell snow cones to keep their patrons cool. Because of this association with the theater, snow cones were thought of as an upper-class luxury. Signs in theaters instructing patrons to finish their snow cones before coming in to the second act are the earliest tangible evidence of snow cones. In the Baltimore theaters at the time, hand shavers were used to shave the ice. In the 1890s, many people started to invent easier ways to make snow cones. In that decade, patents for electric ice shavers were filed.

=== 20th Century ===
Samuel Bert invented a snow cone machine to sell snow cones at the State Fair of Texas in 1919. He patented his invention the next year. Snow cones became available outside of Baltimore during the Great Depression and the Second World War because they were exceptionally affordable. Their low cost earned them several nicknames including the Hard Times Sundae and the Penny Sunday. The low cost of producing and selling snow cones created many straightforward opportunities for work. After ice cream became unavailable at the home front, snow cones arose as a nationally popular alternative in America.

== See also ==
- Shaved ice § Regions, for similar shaved ice variations around the world.
- Italian ice – water ice
- Maple taffy – a Quebec and New England treat of boiled maple sap poured on snow
- Slush / Slushie – a shaved ice drink
  - Icee – brand-name product
  - Slurpee – brand name
  - Slush Puppie – brand name
- Snow cream – a cream or snow and dairy-based dessert
- Piragua
