= Grattachecca =

Cold street food originating in Rome, Italy

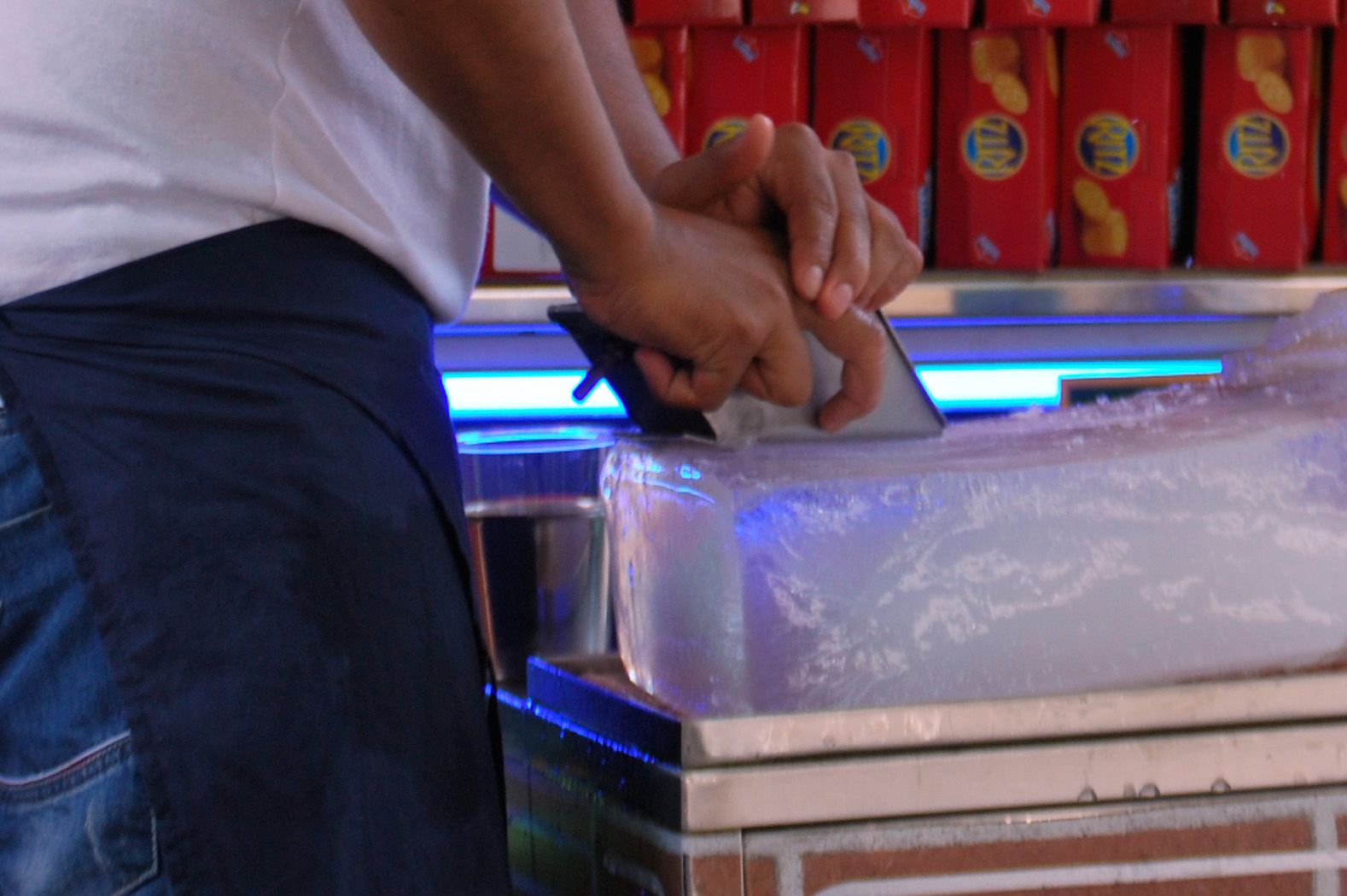
- Course: Snack
- Place of origin: Italy
- Region or state: Rome
- Main ingredients: Shaved ice, syrup

Grattachecca is a shaved ice originating in Rome, Italy. Commonly sold in kiosks and bars as street food, it consists of hand-shaved ice topped with various flavors of sweet syrup. In contemporary times, some grattachecca vendors use a mechanical ice crusher, rather than shaving or grating the ice by hand; some vendors believe that using a machine is more hygienic compared to hand shaving the ice.

== Alla fonte d'oro ==
The kiosk Alla fonte d'oro is the oldest in the city, and has served Romans and tourists since 1913. The kiosk uses machine-grated ice, rather than grating it by hand.

== Gallery ==
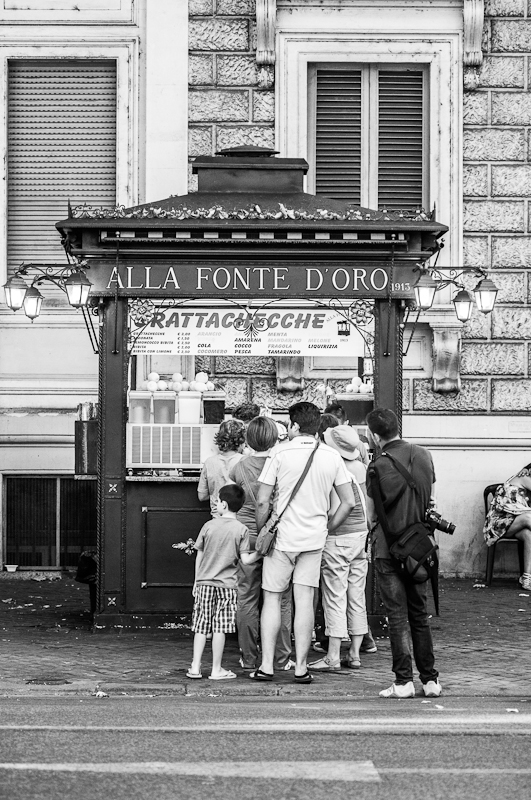
The Alla fonte d'oro kiosk

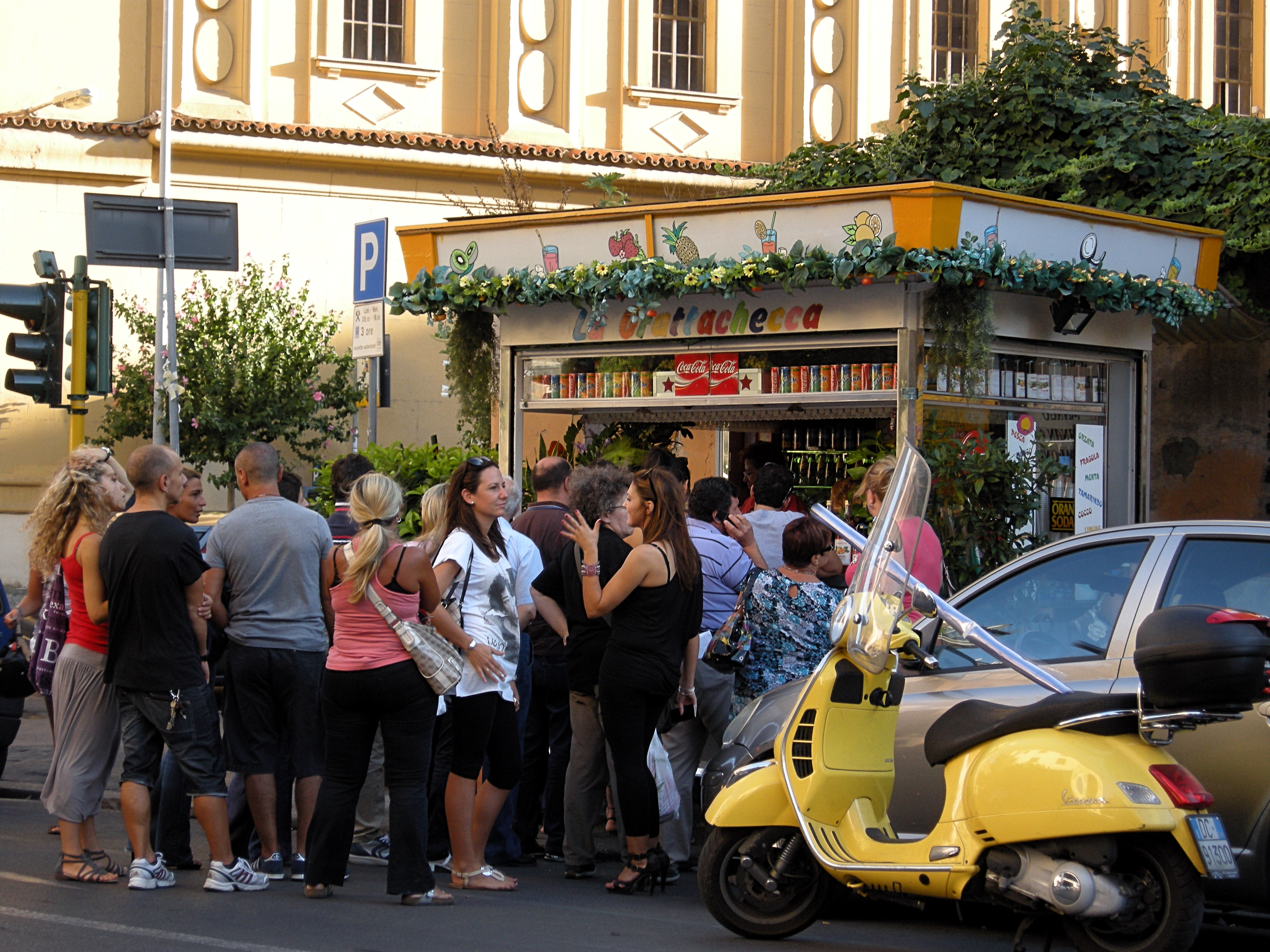
Customers at La Sora Maria - La Grattachecca on Via Trionfale, Rome, Italy

== See also ==
Media related to Grattachecca at Wikimedia Commons

- List of Italian desserts and pastries
- Shaved ice § Regions – for similar shaved ice variations around the world
