= Chinese barbecue sauce =

Chinese barbecue sauce may refer to:

- Siu haau sauce - a thick, savory, slightly spicy sauce generally known as the primary barbecue sauce used within Chinese and Cantonese cuisine.
- Shacha sauce - of Southeast Asian origin, used as a barbecue rub, as well as for other culinary purposes.
- Satay sauce - a peanut-based sauce of Southeast Asian origin. Informally referred to as a Chinese barbecue sauce.
