= Hong Kong Top Brand Awards =

Hong Kong Top Brand Awards (formerly known as Hong Kong Top Ten Brandnames Awards, renamed in 2004) is a competition held in the Hong Kong Products Expo.

The Hong Kong Top Brand Awards logo

== Rename and Introduction of new logos ==
From 2004, the Hong Kong Top Ten Brandnames Awards was renamed as "Hong Kong Top Brand Awards" and a brand-new logo has been implemented to reinstate the previous Award logo. Supervised by Kan Tai Keung (靳埭強), the logo retained the fundamental features of previous "Top Mark", while also looking more internationalised, noticeable, fashionable and vibrant. On 2005 January 1, the previous Award logo will be totally suspended for any purpose. To reinforce the supervision of the use of logo, the Association also put the Hong Kong Top Brand Mark Scheme into practice autonomously, so as to bring in a unified identity system for Awardees, and to improve the reviewing process and continuing development of the Award.

== Hong Kong Top Brand Mark ==
All awardees should account to the Organizer concerning products under the winning brands. The license is subject to renewal on an annual basis. If the winning company falls short to renew license for any product, it should not use the Mark in any case use the Mark or promote individual products by means of the awards; and they are required to evidently signify the entire title of the award, the year of conferment and the name of Organizer whenever quoting the award in literature.

== Award winners ==
=== 1999 ===
- A-Fontane
- Airland
- Aji Ichiban
- GP Batteries
- Hang Heung
- Knife Brand
- Lee Kum Kee
- Nin Jiom
- Hoe Hin Pak Fah Yeow
- Wing Wah

=== 2000 ===
==== Top Ten Brandnames ====
- AXE
- Crocodile
- Eagle's
- Goodway
- Lion & Globe Brand
- Long Far
- Red A
- Sau Tao Brand
- Universe
- Vitasoy

==== Most Popular Brandname On-line ====
- Crocodile

=== 2001 ===
==== Top Ten Brandnames ====
- Aqua Pure
- Dai Pai Dong
- Eu Yan Sang
- Flower
- Garden Bakeries
- German Tops
- Golden Elephant Brand
- Maid Brand
- Tung Rong Hung
- Wai Yuen Tong

==== Emerging Brandname ====
- Lo Hong Ka

==== Most Popular Brandname On-line ====
- Dai Pai Dong

=== 2002 ===
==== The Honorary Award ====
- A-Fontane

==== Top Ten Brandnames ====
- Camel Brand
- Chicks
- Chow Tai Fook
- Four Seas
- Hung Fook Tong
- Lamex
- Lo Hong Ka
- Neil Pryde
- Red Lantern
- Sea Horse

==== Emerging Brandname ====
- LK

==== Most Popular Brandname On-line ====
- Chow Tai Fook

=== 2003 ===
==== The Honorary Award ====
- Eu Yan Sang
- GP
- Lion & Globe Brand

==== Top Ten Brandnames ====
- 3D-Gold
- Amoy
- Fortune
- Golden Statue
- Greendotdot
- Maxim's
- Octopus
- Sau San Tong
- Watsons Water
- Weiyuen

==== Emerging Brandname ====
- Ling Nam

==== Most Popular Brandname On-line ====
- Sau San Tong

=== 2004 ===
==== Hong Kong Premier Brand ====
- Aqua Pure
- Lee Kum Kee

==== Hong Kong Top Brand ====
- American Roses Brand
- Doll noodle
- FLUID
- Fung Yip
- Goods of Desire
- German Pool
- Imperial Bird's Nest
- Luk Fook Jewellery
- Saint Honore
- San Miguel Brewery
- Tien Chu

==== Emerging Brand ====
- Tsit Wing

==== Most Popular Brand On-line ====
- Lee Kum Kee

=== 2008 ===
==== Hong Kong Top Brand ====
- Catalo
- LK
- Madame Pearl's
- Mr. Juicy
- Super Star
- Taikoo
- Tung Chun
- Vita Green Lingzhi
