= Lee Kum Kee =

Hong Kong-based food company

Lee Kum Kee Company Limited
- Logo since 1988
- Type: Private
- Industry: Food
- Founded: 1888; 138 years ago
- Founder: Lee Kum Sheung
- Headquarters: Tai Po, New Territories, Hong Kong
- Key people: Sammy Lee (chairman)

Chinese name
- Traditional Chinese: 李錦記有限公司
- Simplified Chinese: 李锦记有限公司
Transcriptions
Standard Mandarin
- Hanyu Pinyin: Lǐ Jǐn jì yǒuxiàn gōngsī
Yue: Cantonese
- Jyutping: Lei^{5} Gam^{2} gei^{3} jau^{5} haan^{6} gung^{1} si^{1}
- Website: www.lkk.com

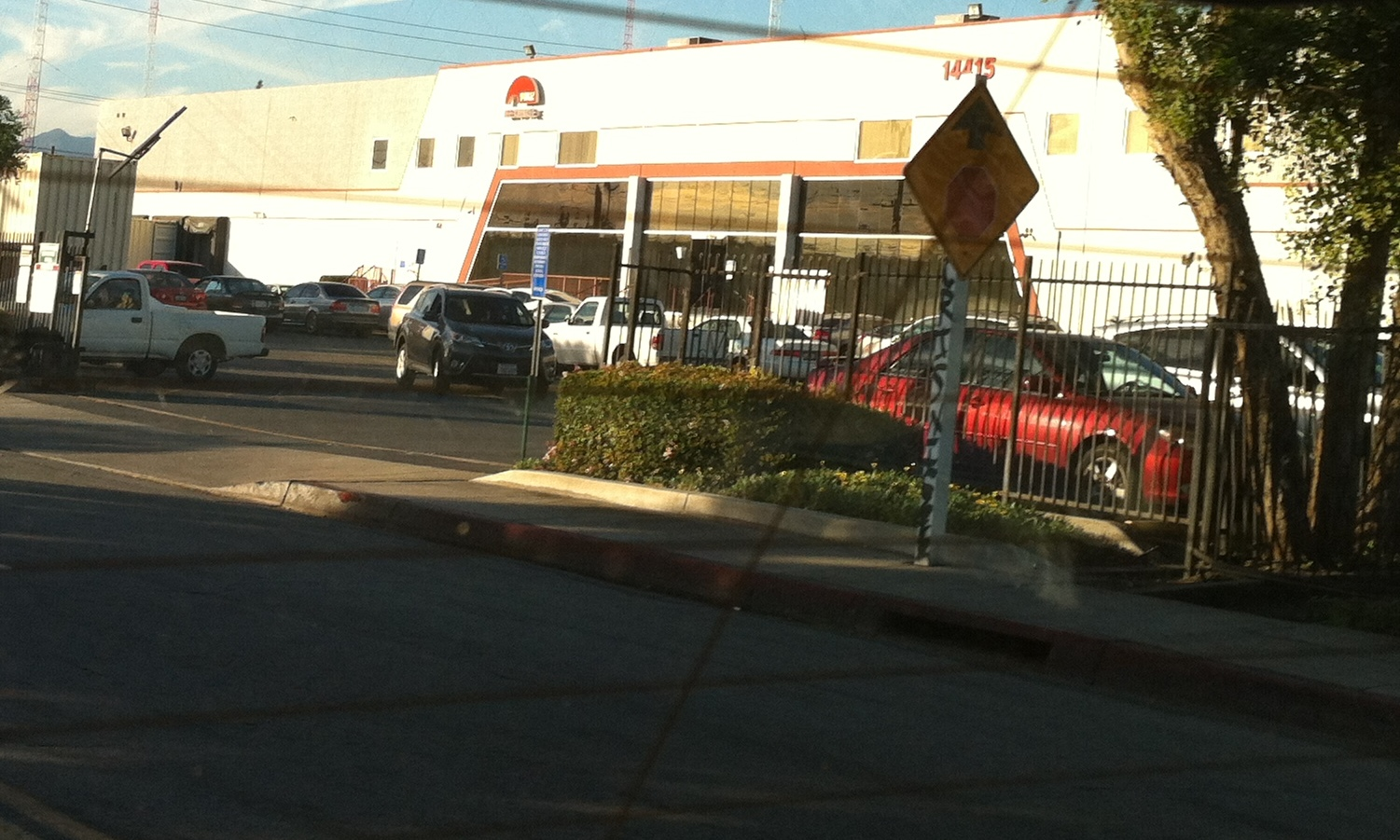
U.S. LKK factory in Industry, California

Lee Kum Kee Company Limited (Chinese: 李錦記有限公司) is a Hong Kong–based food company which specializes in manufacturing a wide range of Chinese and Asian sauces. Founded by Lee Kum Sheung in 1888 in Nanshui, Guangdong, Lee Kum Kee produces over 300 Chinese-style sauces, including oyster sauce, soy sauce, hoisin sauce, XO sauce, one-step recipe sauce, chili sauce, cooking ingredients, and dipping sauce. Additionally, Lee Kum Kee Group purchased London's landmark Walkie-Talkie skyscraper in July 2017 for £1.3bn, which was a record-breaking transaction for a single building in the UK.

== History ==
The company is based in Hong Kong but its products are sold in over 100 countries worldwide including China, and in many overseas markets, including North America, Europe, Southeast Asia, Australia and New Zealand. Its primary brand, Lee Kum Kee (李錦記; 李锦记; lei5 gam2 gei3; 'the Lee Kum brand') is popular throughout China and the overseas Chinese community. Lee Kum Kee was named Most Popular Brand On-line at the 2004 Hong Kong Top Brand Awards.

The company was founded by Lee Kum Sheung (李錦裳; 李锦裳; lei5 gam2 soeng4), an owner of a small eatery in Nanshui, Zhuhai, Guangdong that sold cooked oysters. In 1888, he formed the Lee Kum Kee company to market his version of oyster sauce, a staple sauce, seasoning and condiment in Cantonese and southern Chinese cuisine. It continues to be run as a family business by the Lee family.

From 1902 to 1932, the company's office was located in Macau and in 1932 it moved to its newest headquarters in Hong Kong. Lee Kum Kee opened a production plant in City of Industry, California, in Greater Los Angeles in 1991. Production bases are located in Xinhui, Huangpu, Hong Kong, Malaysia and Los Angeles. The Xinhui factory is the largest operation occupying 1.33 million square meters.

In April 2016, the Lee Kum Kee family donated $21 million to fund Lee Kum Sheung Center for Health and Happiness, to "help identify how positive aspects of living can lead to better health and a longer life" and "coordinate research across many disciplines at Harvard University" and "understanding the complex interplay between positive psychological well-being and human health."

The family was worth an estimated $15 billion in 2019.

== Food safety ==
In 2000 to 2001, Britain's Food Standards Agency (FSA) identified various brands of Chinese and South-East Asian sauces, including Lee Kum Kee products, with suspected human carcinogens 3-MCPD and 1,3-dichloropropanol (1,3-DCP) contamination at levels hundreds of times higher than those deemed safe by the UK and European Union. Lee Kum Kee was not singled out in what appeared to be an industry-wide problem. The results were published in a June 2001 report.

Lee Kum Kee responded by stating that the affected products were all manufactured before 1999 when the manufacturing technology was updated; as a result, from 1999 their products contain no DCP. In a press release, Lee Kum Kee said that FSA cleared Lee Kum Kee's name in a separate statement to the industry issued within 24 hours of the FSA's initial report which indicated that "None of the products sampled from major retail chains posed any safety concern" and stressed that "there was no reason to avoid Chinese food." Lee Kum Kee also claimed that the Food and Environmental Hygiene Department of the Government of Hong Kong has indicated that all Lee Kum Kee products in Hong Kong complied with safety standards as evidenced by a separate study.

Additionally, in July 2001, Lee Kum Kee submitted to FSA certificates of analysis for the presence of 3-MCPD which showed that the soy sauce imported into Europe complies with the proposed EU limit for 3-MCPD.

== Lee Kum Kee Group ==
Lee Kum Kee Group, or LKK Group, oversees all LKK-related businesses beyond just the sauce business, including LKK Health Products, Happiness Capital, and a charitable foundation.

=== Group chairman ===
1. Lee Kum-sheung (1888–1920)
2. Lee Shiu-nan (1920–1972)
3. Lee Man-tat (1972–2021)
4. Sammy Lee (Since 2022)

== See also ==
- List of Chinese sauces
