= Shacha noodles =

Chinese noodle dish

Shacha noodle
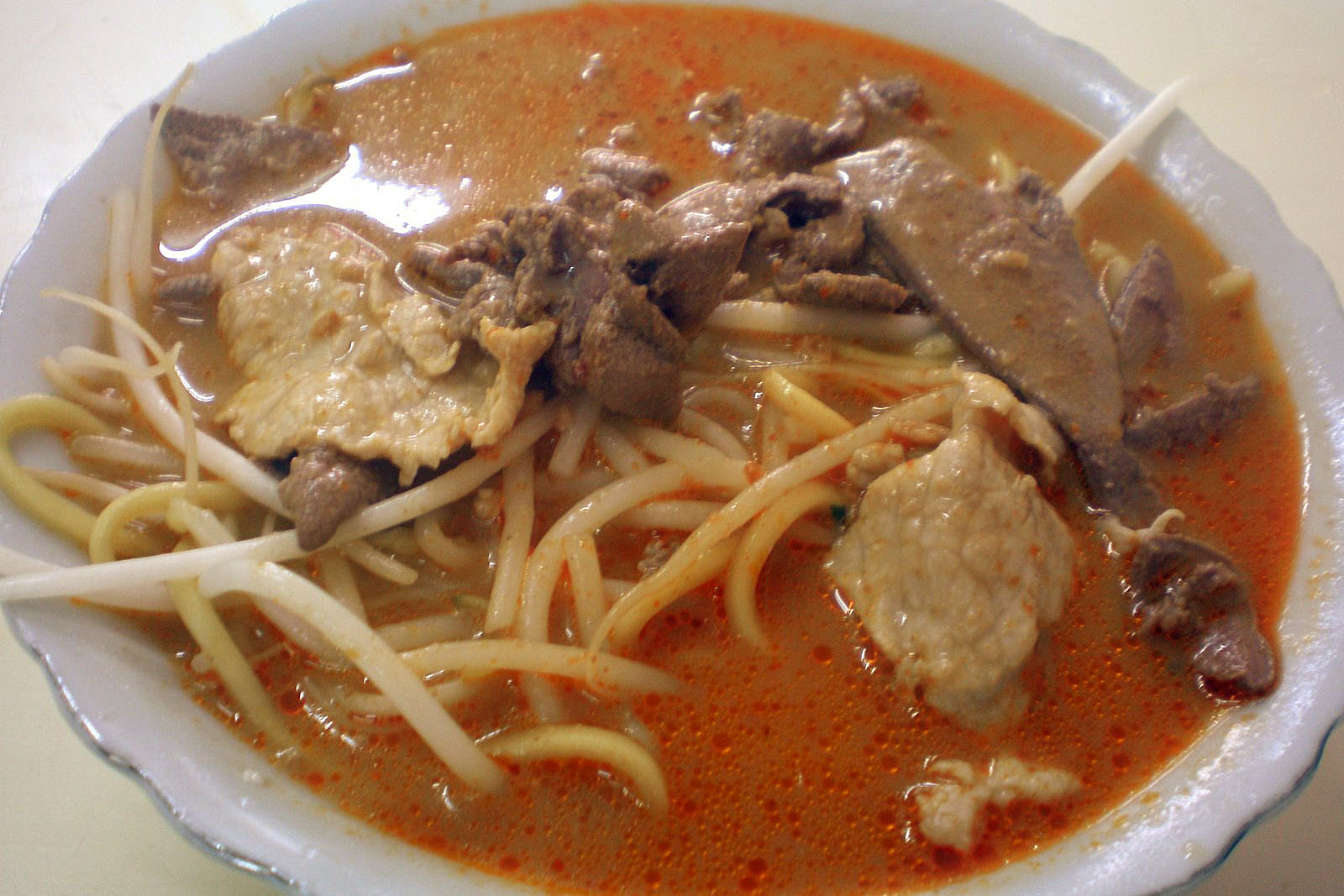
- Alternative names: Sate noodle, Satay noodle
- Place of origin: China
- Main ingredients: Shacha sauce, oil noodles, beansprouts, water

Shacha noodles (simplified Chinese: 沙茶面; traditional Chinese: 沙茶麵; pinyin: shā chá miàn; Pe̍h-ōe-jī: sa-te-mī), also known as sate or satay noodles, is a noodle dish popular in southern Fujian province. The soup is made from shacha sauce and oil noodles, and is served with bean sprouts, pork liver and other ingredients added as toppings.

On December 11, 1997, Xiamen Wu Zaitian Sate Noodles was identified as one of China's top famous snacks.

== Origin ==
Satay or sate is a popular dish originally from Indonesia and Malaysia. Tea drinking is popular in the Minnan region (another term for southern Fujian province), so the Malay word for sate is translated into Minnan's word for sa-te which is called sha-cha in Standard Mandarin. Another saying about the origin of shacha noodle is that "tay" in satay has a similar pronunciation to the local Hokkien word for tea-"cha" so people call this food which is made from satay sauce shacha noodle.

== Ingredients ==
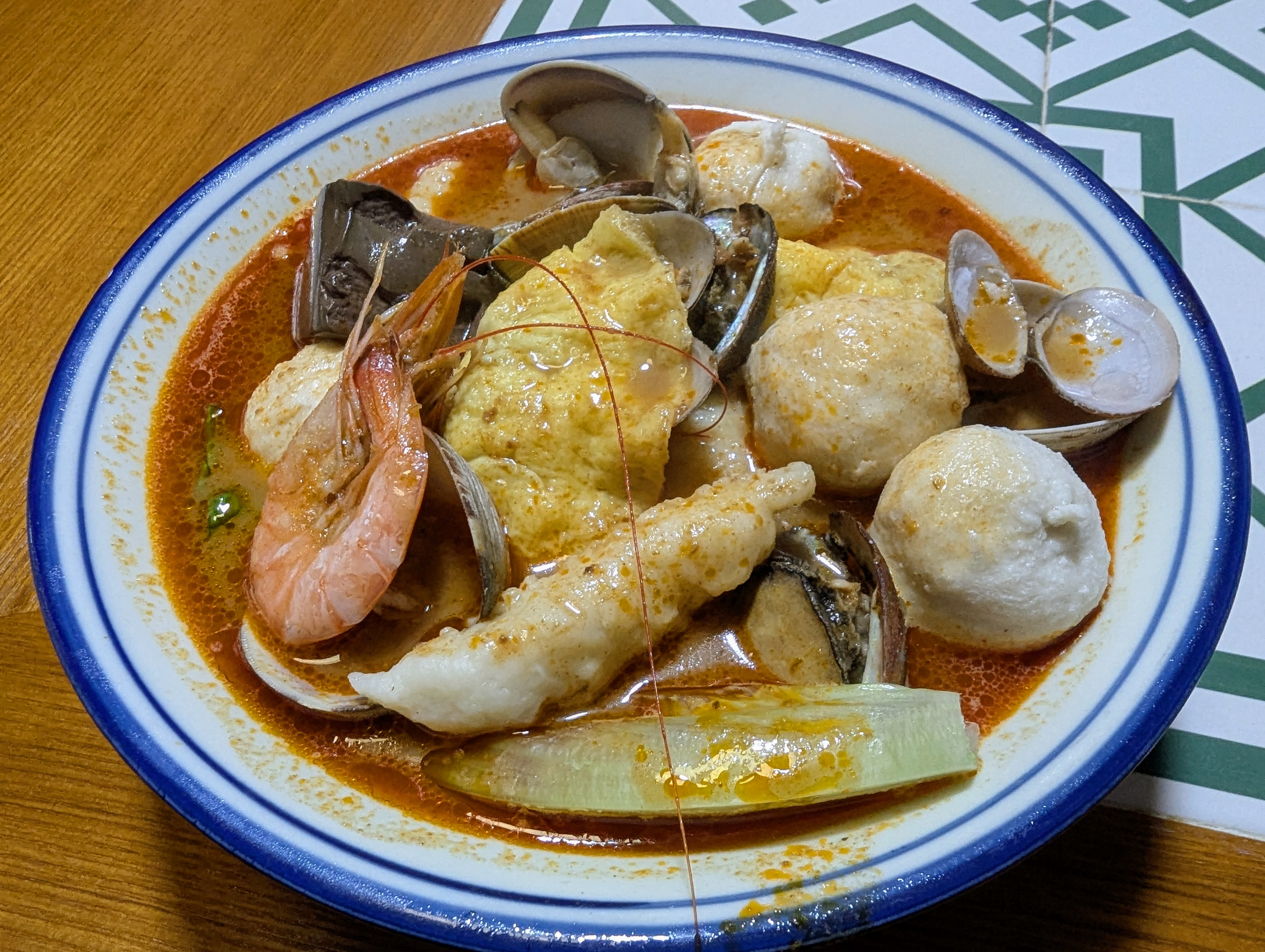
Shacha noodles with abalone and other seafood

The common and main ingredients of shacha noodle are shacha sauce, oil noodles, beansprouts and water. Other ingredients can be added for flavor such as fried tofu or shrimp. Deluxe versions may include expensive ingredients like abalone.

== See also ==
- Fujian cuisine
- List of Chinese dishes
- List of peanut dishes
- Noodle soup
- Peanut sauce
- Shacha sauce
