= Duck sauce =

Dip for Chinese-style duck dishes

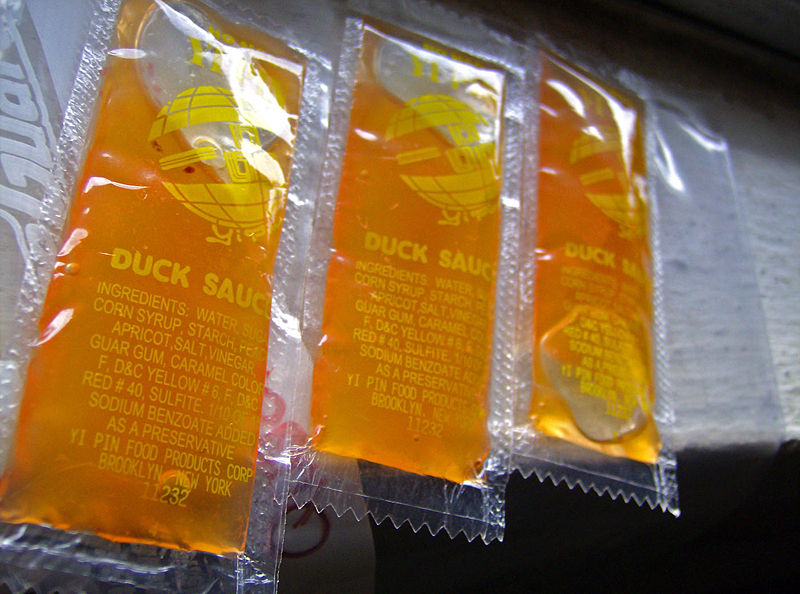
- Packets of duck sauce
- Traditional Chinese: 酸梅醬
- Simplified Chinese: 酸梅酱
- Literal meaning: sour plum sauce
Transcriptions
Standard Mandarin
- Hanyu Pinyin: suān méi jiàng
Yue: Cantonese
- Jyutping: syun1 mui4 zoeng3

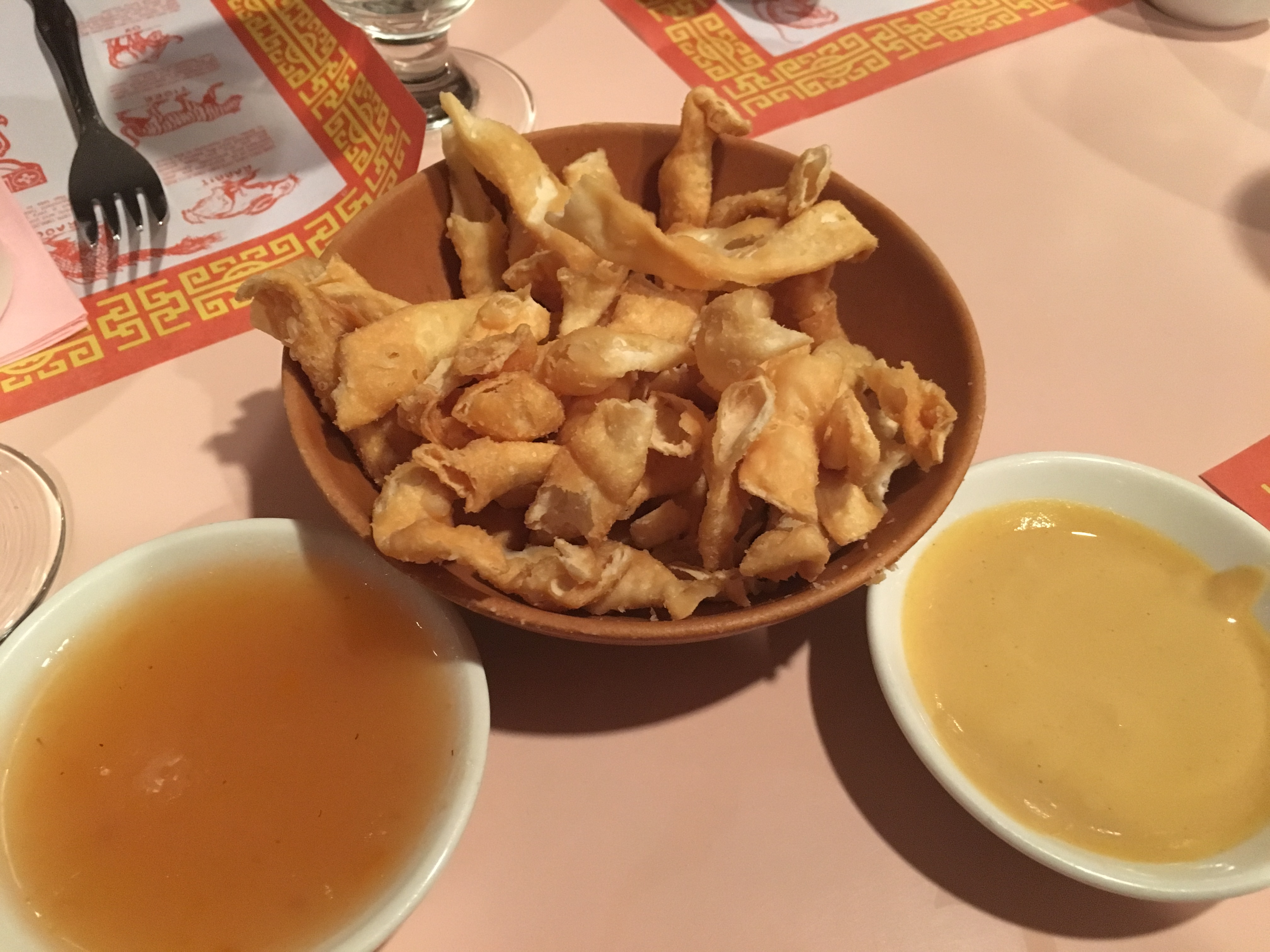
Wonton strips served with duck sauce and hot mustard at an American Chinese restaurant

Duck sauce or Orange sauce is a condiment with a sweet and sour flavor and a translucent orange appearance similar to a thin jelly. Offered at east coast and midwestern American Chinese restaurants, it is used as a dip for deep-fried dishes such as wonton strips, spring rolls, egg rolls, duck, chicken, and fish, or with rice or noodles. It is often provided in single-serving packets along with soy sauce, mustard, hot sauce or red chili powder. It may be used as a glaze on foods, such as poultry. Despite its name, the sauce is not prepared using duck meat; rather it is named as such because it is a common accompaniment to Chinese-style duck dishes.

== Ingredients ==
It is made of plums, apricots, pineapples or peaches added to sugar, vinegar, ginger and chili peppers. It is used in more traditional Chinese cuisine in the form of plum sauce.

== Name ==
It is speculated that the name "duck sauce" came about because its ancestor, tianmian sauce, was first served with Peking duck in China. When the Chinese emigrated to the U.S., they created Chinese dishes that would appeal more to the American palate, and developed a sweeter version of the sauce used in China.

== See also ==
- List of dips
- Hoisin sauce
- Oyster sauce
- Siu haau sauce
- Sweet and sour sauce
