= Plum sauce =

Chinese condiment

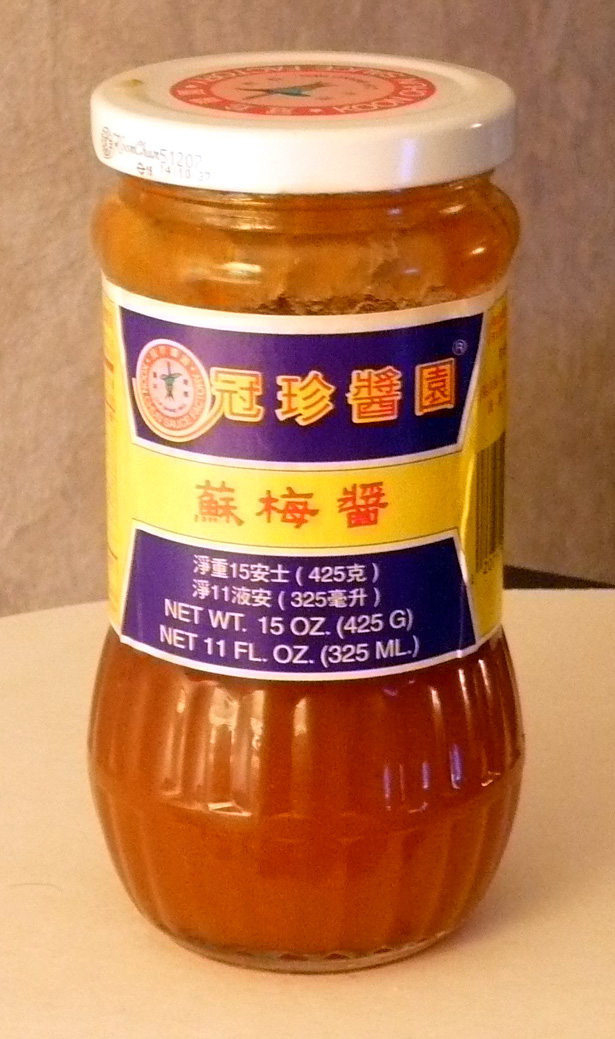
- A jar of plum sauce
- Traditional Chinese: 蘇梅醬
- Simplified Chinese: 苏梅酱
Transcriptions
Standard Mandarin
- Hanyu Pinyin: sūméijiàng
Yue: Cantonese
- Jyutping: sou1 mui4 zoeng3
Southern Min
- Hokkien POJ: soo-muê-chiùⁿ

Plum sauce is a viscous, light-brown sweet and sour condiment. It is used in Cantonese cuisine as a dip for deep-fried dishes, such as spring rolls, noodles, deep-fried chicken balls, and roast duck. It is made from sweet plums – some brands and recipes include other fruit such as apple, peach, pineapple or apricot – along with sugar, vinegar, salt, ginger and chili peppers.

Detroit-style plum sauce is a variation of Chinese-American plum sauce found in most Chinese restaurants in the southeastern Michigan area. It is a watery, sweet, vinegar-based sauce that offers a much weaker flavor compared to traditionally prepared plum sauce.

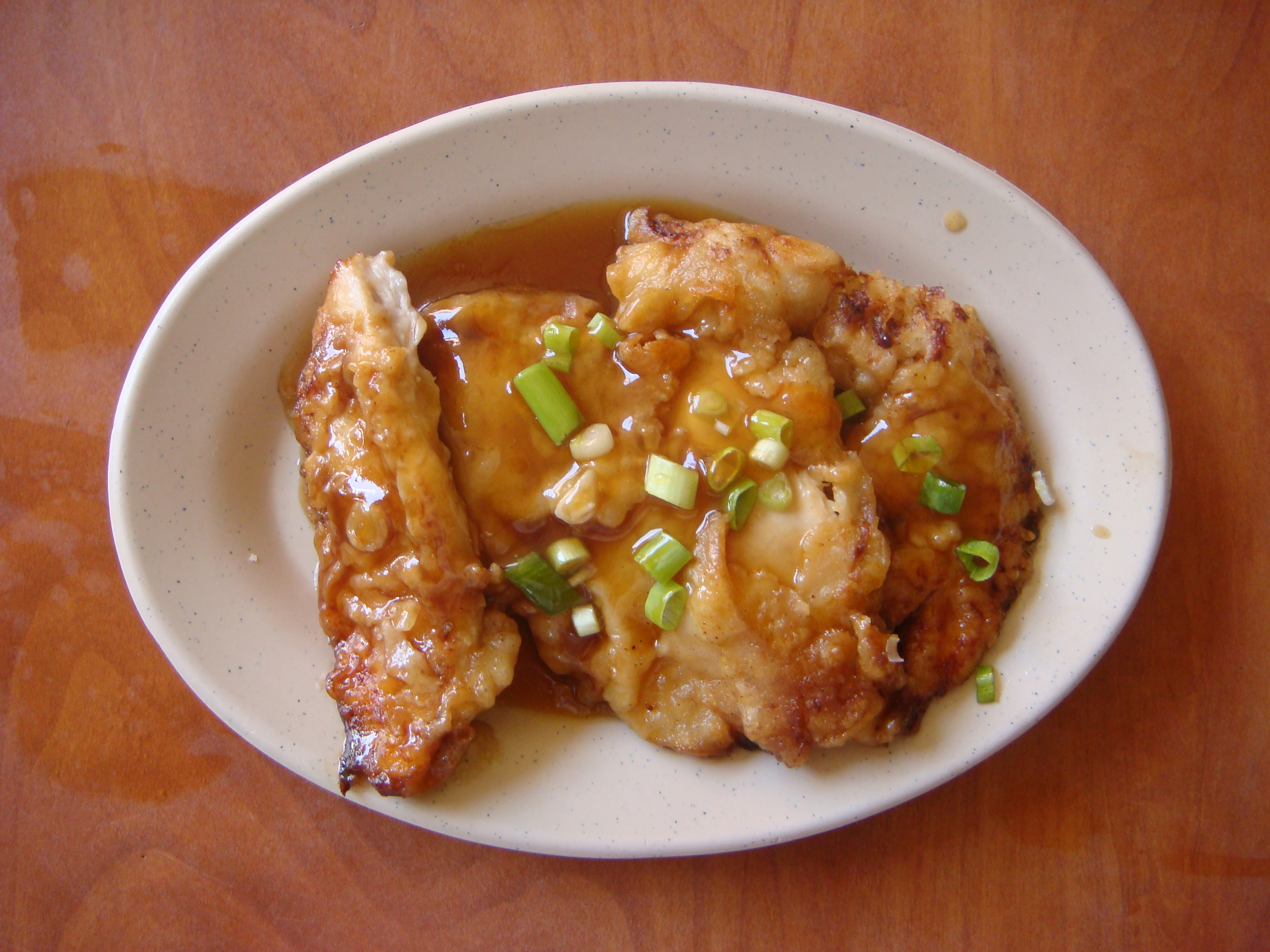
Chicken in plum sauce

== See also ==
- Duck sauce: an American-Chinese sweet-and-sour fruit sauce
- Sweet and sour sauce: several kinds
- Tkemali: plum sauce of Georgia (Caucasus)
- Mumbo sauce: trade name of an American sauce
- Hoisin sauce: sauce based on fermented soybean paste
- Oyster sauce
- Siu haau sauce: a primary Chinese barbecue sauce
- Soy sauce: a saline sauce based on fermented soybean
- Chamoy: a Mexican savory fruit sauce
- List of dips
- List of Chinese sauces
- List of sauces
