= Conpoy =

Cantonese dried scallop

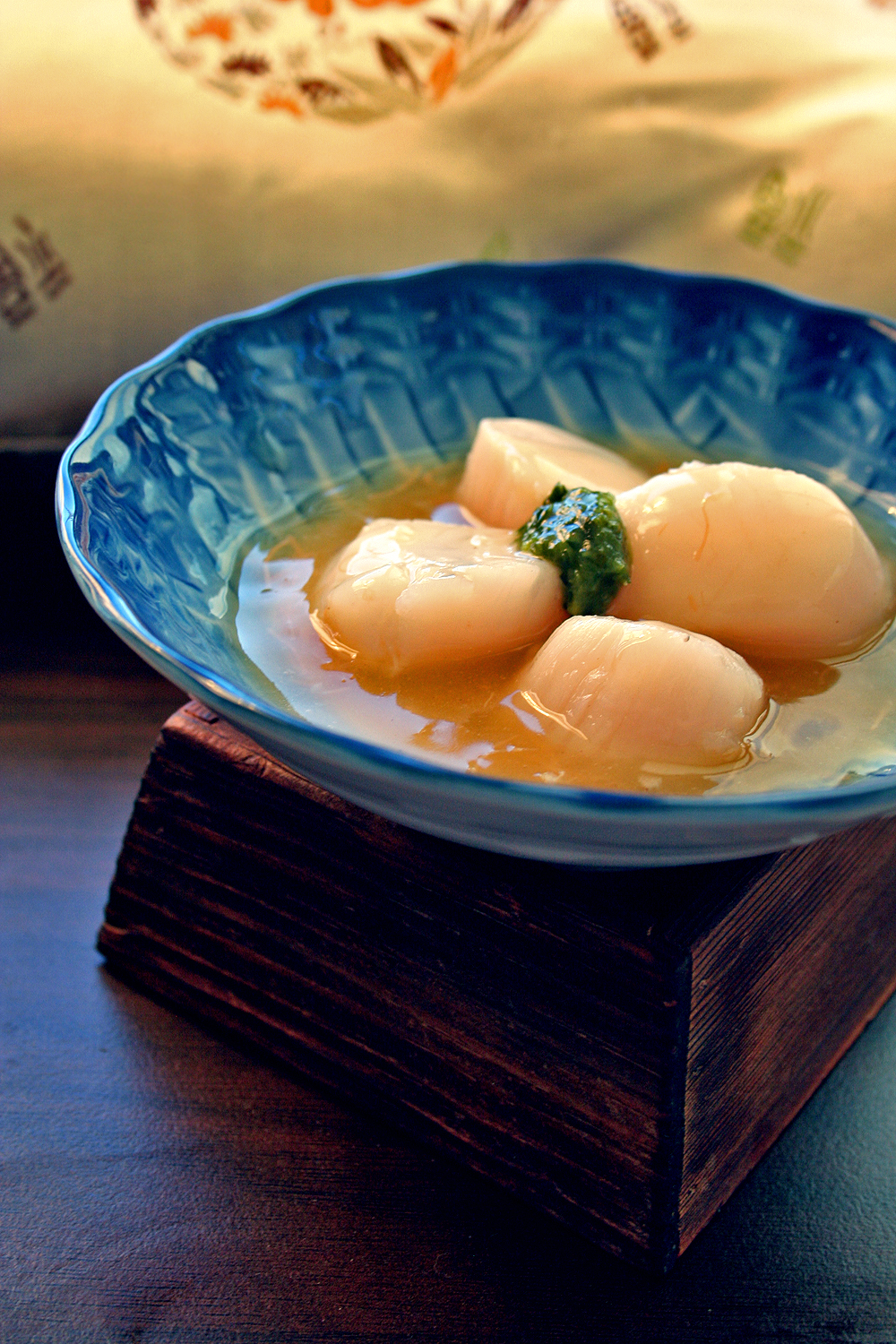
- Traditional Chinese: 江瑤柱
- Simplified Chinese: 江瑶柱
- Literal meaning: river scallop
Transcriptions
Standard Mandarin
- Hanyu Pinyin: jiāng yáo zhù
Yue: Cantonese
- Yale Romanization: gōng yìuh chyúh
- Jyutping: gong¹ jiu⁴ cyu⁵

Alternative Chinese name
- Traditional Chinese: 乾瑤柱
- Simplified Chinese: 干瑶柱
- Literal meaning: dried scallop
Transcriptions
Standard Mandarin
- Hanyu Pinyin: gān yáo zhù
Yue: Cantonese
- Yale Romanization: gōn yìuh chyúh
- Jyutping: gon¹ jiu⁴ cyu⁵

Second alternative Chinese name
- Traditional Chinese: 干貝
- Simplified Chinese: 干贝
- Literal meaning: dried shell(fish)
Transcriptions
Standard Mandarin
- Hanyu Pinyin: gānbèi
Yue: Cantonese
- Yale Romanization: gōn bui
- Jyutping: gon¹ bui³
Southern Min
- Hokkien POJ: kan-pōe

Conpoy or dried scallop is a type of Chinese dried seafood product that is made from the adductor muscle of scallops. The smell of conpoy is marine, pungent, and reminiscent of certain salt-cured meats. Its taste is rich in umami due to its high content of various free amino acids, such as glycine, alanine, and glutamic acid. It is also rich in nucleic acids such as inosinic acid, amino acid byproducts such as taurine, and minerals, such as calcium and zinc.

Conpoy is produced by cooking raw scallops and then drying them.

== Terminology ==
Conpoy is a loanword from the Cantonese pronunciation of 乾貝 (gōn bui), which literally means "dried shell(fish)".

== Usage ==
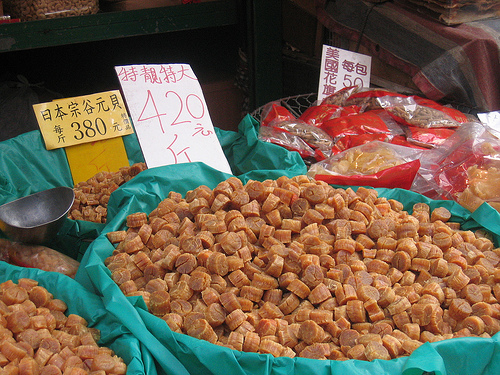
Scallops for sale at a market.

In Hong Kong, conpoy from two types of scallops are common. Conpoy made from Atrina pectinata or gōng yìuh (江珧) from mainland China is small and milder in taste. Mizuhopecten yessoensis or sin bui (扇貝), a sea scallop imported from Japan (hotategai, 帆立貝 in Japanese), produces a conpoy that is stronger and richer in taste.

As with many dried foods, conpoy was originally made as a way to preserve seafood in times of excess. In more recent times its use in cuisine has been elevated to gourmet status. Conpoy has a strong and distinctive flavor that can be easily identified when used in rice congee, stir fries, stews, and sauces.

XO sauce, a seasoning used for frying vegetables or seafoods in Cantonese cuisine, contains significant quantities of conpoy. For example, the Lee Kum Kee formulation lists conpoy as the third ingredient on its label.

== See also ==
- Budu – Fish sauce originating from east coast of Peninsular Malaysia
- Dried shrimp – Dried shrimp used as seasoning
- Fish sauce – Condiment made from fish
- List of delicacies – Food item considered highly desirable in certain cultures
- List of dried foods
- Padaek – Lao pickled or fermented fish condiment
- Saeu-jeot – Fermented shrimp in Korean cuisine
- Shrimp paste – Fermented condiment
- Smoked scallop
