= Lee Man Tat =

Hong Kong billionaire (1929–2021)

- 李文達
- Born: 1929; Macau
- Died: 26 July 2021 (aged 91–92)
- Occupation: Businessman
- Title: Chairman, Lee Kum Kee Group
- Spouse: Married
- Children: 5

Lee Man Tat BBS (1929 – 26 July 2021, traditional Chinese: 李文達; simplified Chinese: 李文达; pinyin: Lǐ Wéndá) was a Hong Kong billionaire and chairman of the family-owned Chinese sauce and condiment company Lee Kum Kee.

== Biography ==
Lee Man Tat was born in Macau in 1930, the eldest son of Lee Siu-nam and his wife. He was the grandson of Lee Kum-sheung who invented oyster sauce and founded the Lee Kum Kee company in Zhuhai, China, in 1888.

Lee left school when he was 15 and worked for the family business in China until 1949 when the People's Republic of China was established, returning to Macau and moving into manufacturing. He joined Lee Kum Kee, now based in Hong Kong, and took over the running of the company from his father in 1972, when he bought out his uncles with the help of his father. He expanded the company’s presence in North America, serving the Chinese diaspora, particularly in San Francisco, Vancouver, New York and the east coast of the United States. In 1986, following a dispute over plans for the company, he bought his younger brother's 40% stake for HK$80 million. In 1992, Lee and his son, Sammy, diversified into health supplements forming LKK Health Products. In 1995 and 1996, Lee opened a manufacturing plant and a production base in China, which became the company’s largest market. According to Bloomberg Billionaires Index, his wealth was estimated at US$17.9bn. The family invested in property and in July 2017, LKK Health Products purchased London's landmark Walkie-Talkie building for £1.3 billion.

Lee married Choi May Ling in 1954 and had five children, all of whom joined the company, and lived in Hong Kong. He was awarded the Silver Bauhinia Star in 2018. He died on 26 July 2021.
