= Vita Green =

Vita Green Health Products Co., Ltd.
- Native name: 維特健靈健康產
- Company type: Private company
- Industry: Health & Beauty
- Founded: 1993
- Headquarters: Hong Kong, China
- Products: Vita Green Lingzhi, Vita Hair, Vita Calm, Green Lingzhi Honey, G.E Yunzhi Essence
- Number of employees: > 400
- Website: http://www.vitagreen.com

Vita Green Health Products Co., Ltd. (Chinese: 維特健靈), also as known as Vita Green, is a manufacturer and distributor of health and beauty products in Hong Kong. The company was set up in 1993 with two GMP certified factories. Vita Green has developed from its Hong Kong base and now has offices in Asia, Europe and United States. It is primarily known for its line of Doctor's Choice brand vitamins, available in Mannings and Watsons locations throughout the region, as well as its traditional Chinese medicine line, which includes products such as Lingzhi and Bird's Nest. Vita Green frequently supplies traditional Chinese herbs to universities and laboratories for scientific studies.

In 2008, Vita Green Lingzhi received the Hong Kong Top Brand Award.

== Development ==
Vita Green Health Products Co., Ltd. invested a GMP certified plant in 1992 in Guangxi. Since its establishment in 1993, the company owns more than 15 proprietary brands and sells over 150 products. Vita Green has kept expanding its business since 2000 and has chain stores in Causeway Bay, Tsim Sha Tsui and Shatin etc.

== Social Responsibility ==
Vita Green Charitable Foundation was established on 28 June 2009. It donates financial aid to associations and individuals in need. The Foundation is operated and funded by the Vita Green Group. All applications are initially evaluated by a Selection Committee (‘the Committee’) consisting of a team of 5 professionals.

== Spokesperson ==
Year	Spokesperson	Products
2001	Fu Mingxia	OS 21
2003–2004	Lawrence Ng	Vita Hair, Vita Hair Tonic
2005–2006	Dayo Wong	Vita Hair, Vita Hair Tonic
2008	Carol Cheng	Lingzhi, Vita Yin Yang, Bird’s Nest.
2008–2009	Chung Ka Yen	Vita Joy
2007–2016	Sammy Leung	Vita Hair, Vita Hair Tonic
2007–2010	Renee Tai	Herba Precious
2010–2023	Teresa Mo	Vita Green Lingzhi, Vita Yin Yang, Vita Calm, Glucobest, G.E Yunzhi Essence, Vita Green Lingzhi Honey, Vita Joy, Bird’s Nest
2011–2013	Wayne Lai	Vita Green Lingzhi, Vita Yin Yang, Glucobest, Herba Precious, Vita - CM
