= XO sauce =

Spicy seafood sauce from Hong Kong

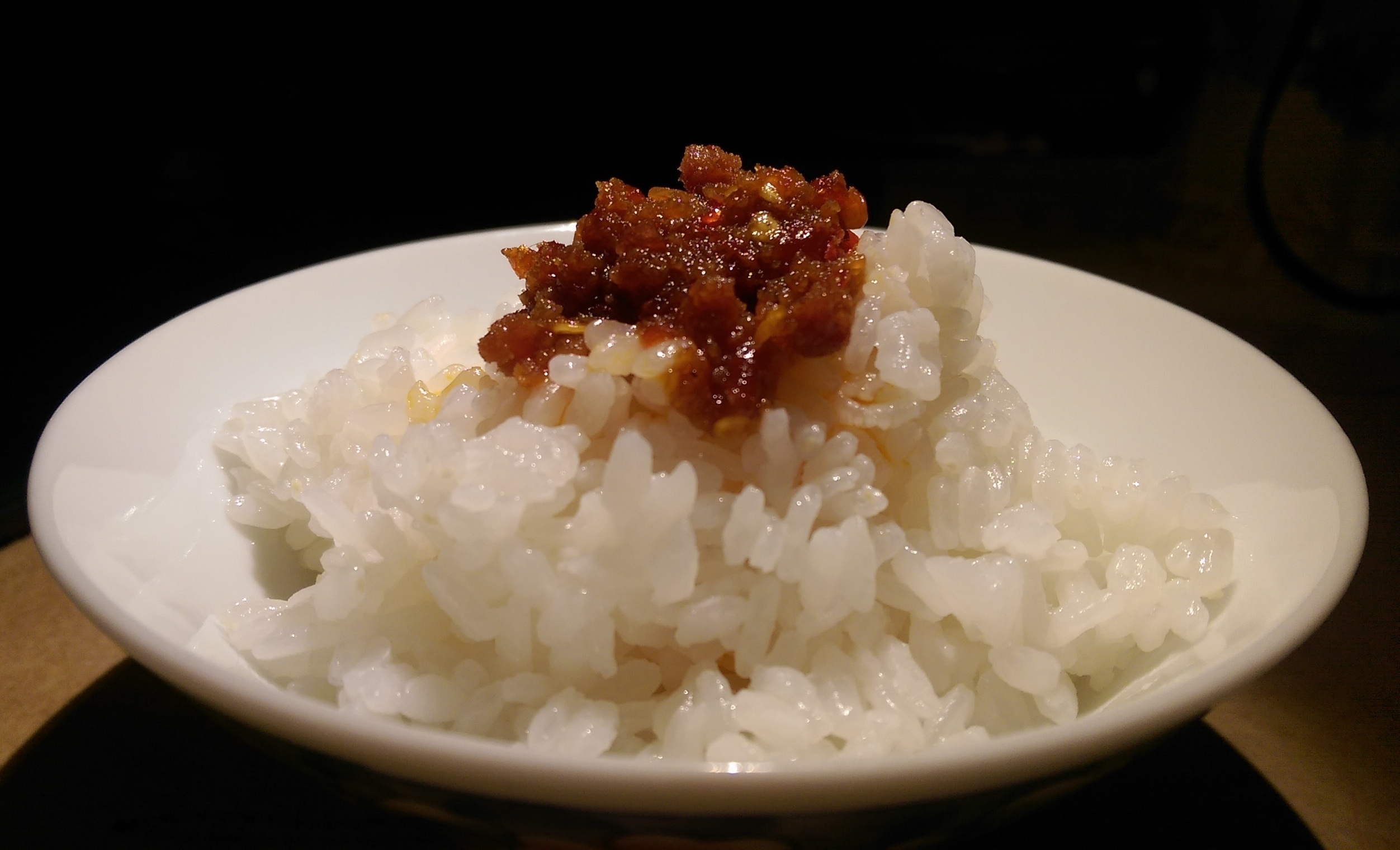
- Rice topped with XO sauce
- Type: Condiment
- Place of origin: Hong Kong
- Created by: Unknown
- Main ingredients: dried scallop, chilli peppers, Jinhua ham, dried shrimp, garlic, vegetable oil

XO sauce
- Traditional Chinese: XO醬
- Simplified Chinese: XO酱
- Cantonese Yale: XO jeung
Transcriptions
Standard Mandarin
- Hanyu Pinyin: XO jiàng
- Bopomofo: XO ㄐㄧㄤˋ
- Wade–Giles: XO chiang^{4}
- IPA: XO [tɕjâŋ]
Wu
- Romanization: XO ^{5}cian
Hakka
- Pha̍k-fa-sṳ: XO chiong
Yue: Cantonese
- Yale Romanization: XO jeung
- Jyutping: XO zoeng3
- IPA: XO [tsœŋ˧]
Southern Min
- Hokkien POJ: XO chiùⁿ
- Teochew Peng'im: XO ziên^{3} / XO zion^{3}
Eastern Min
- Fuzhou BUC: XO cuóng
Northern Min
- Jian'ou Romanized: XO cio̿ng

XO sauce is a spicy seafood sauce from Hong Kong with an umami flavour. It is commonly used in southern Chinese regions such as Guangdong.

== History ==
Developed in the 1980s at The Peninsula Hotel, Hong Kong, for Cantonese cuisine, XO sauce is made of roughly chopped dried seafood, including dried scallops (conpoy), fish and shrimp, which are cooked with chilli peppers, onions and garlic. This dried seafood-based sauce resembles the Fujianese shacha sauce. Spring Moon, the Chinese restaurant of the Peninsula Hong Kong hotel, is often credited with the invention of XO sauce, although some claim it came from other nearby restaurants in the Tsim Sha Tsui area of Kowloon.

== Etymology ==
The name XO sauce comes from fine XO (extra-old) cognac, which is a popular Western liquor in Hong Kong, and considered by many at the time to be a chic product. The name is a misnomer since the condiment contains no cognac, and it is not really a sauce in the traditional, smooth sense, but more chunky, like a relish. The term XO is often used in Hong Kong to denote high quality, prestige and luxury. Indeed, XO sauce has been marketed in the same manner as French liquor, using packaging of similar colour schemes.

== Ingredients ==
Typical ingredients of XO sauce include dried scallop, red chilli pepper, Jinhua ham, dried shrimp, garlic and vegetable oil. Some other recipes also call for salted cured fish and diced onion.

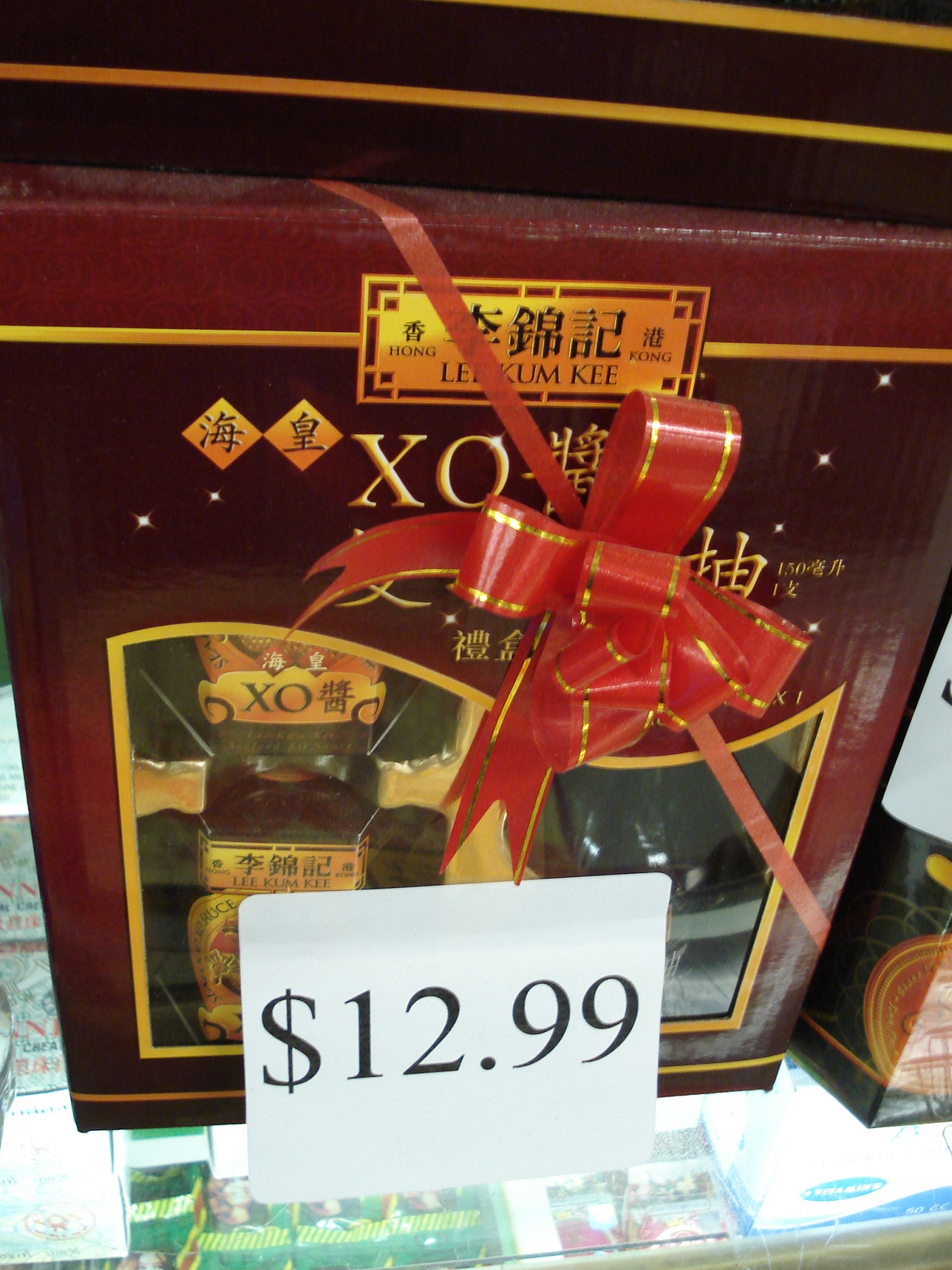
A Lee Kum Kee XO sauce gift pack

Anji Brand XO Sauce, made in China

== Uses ==
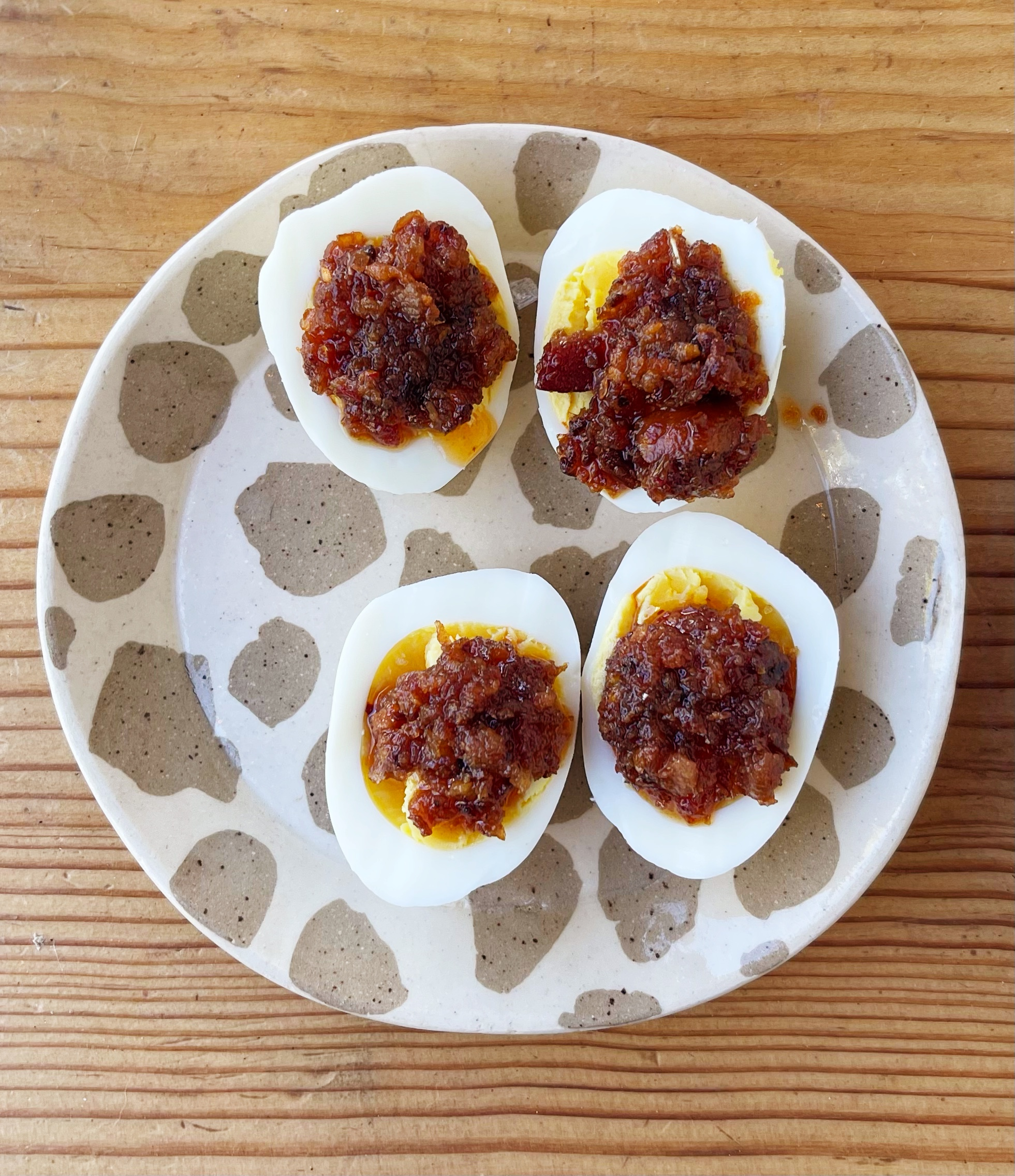
XO sauce atop soft-boiled eggs

XO sauce can be used as a table condiment or in cooking to enhance the flavour of fish, meats, vegetables, and otherwise bland foods such as tofu or noodles.

== See also ==
- Chili oil
- Dim sum
- List of Chinese sauces
- List of fish sauces
- List of sauces
