= Peanut sauce =

Indonesian sauce made from ground roasted or fried peanuts

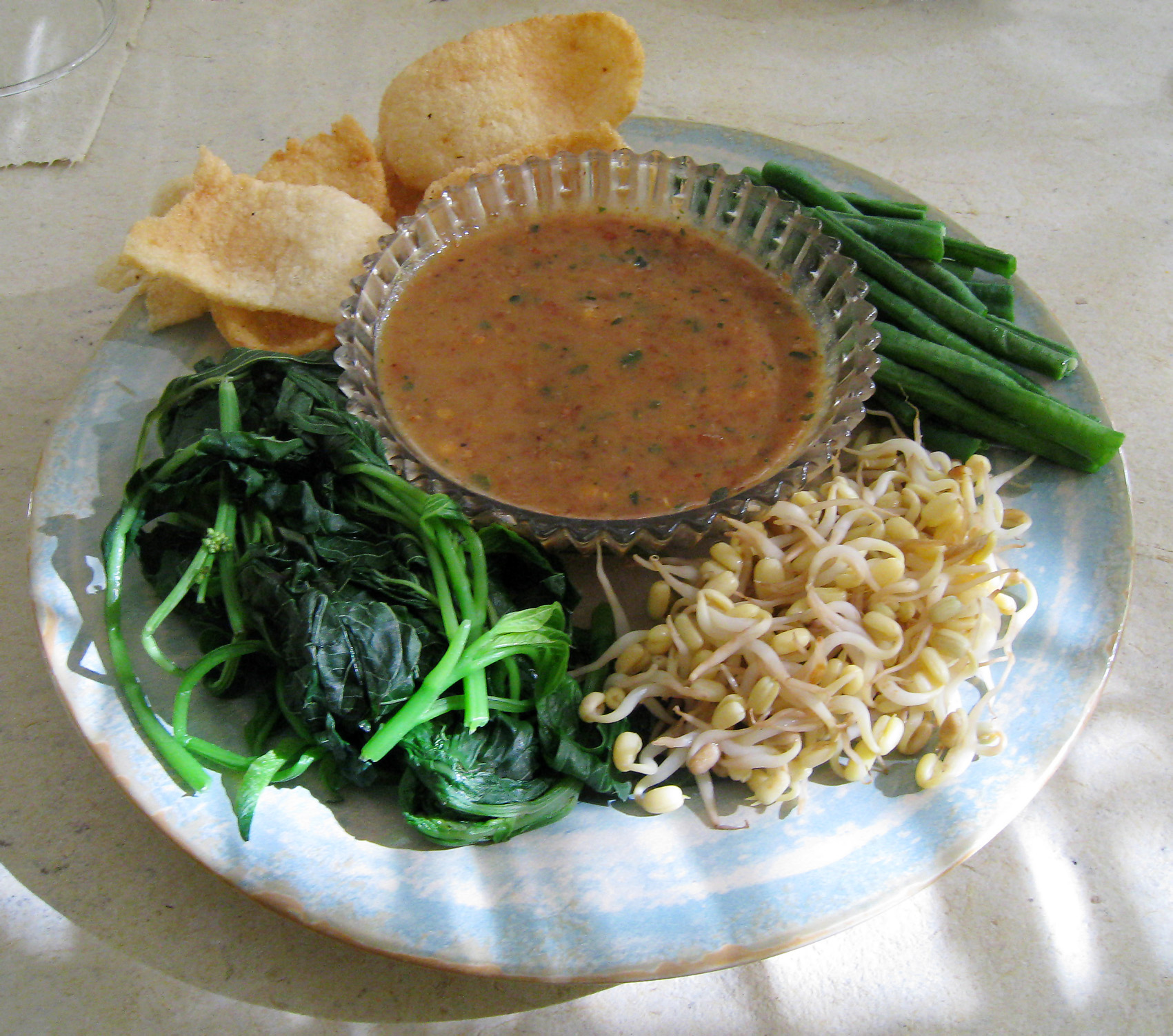
- Peanut sauce with vegetables in pecel
- Alternative names: Satay sauce, bumbu kacang, sambal kacang, pecel
- Type: Condiment
- Place of origin: Asian Cuisine
- Serving temperature: Room temperature
- Main ingredients: Ground roasted peanuts, water and spices
- Other information: Now part of global cuisine, but associated mainly with Southeast Asian cuisine.

In Indonesian cuisine, peanut sauce (bumbu kacang) is a sauce made from ground roasted or fried peanuts, widely used in and many other dishes throughout the world. Specific versions of this sauce include satay sauce (saté sauce), pecel sauce, and sambal kacang, the satay having been adapted globally.

Peanut sauce is used with meat and vegetables, with grilled skewered meat, such as satay, poured over vegetables as salad dressing such as in pecel and gado-gado, or as a dipping sauce.

== Ingredients ==
Many different recipes for making peanut sauces exist, resulting in a variety of flavours, textures and consistency. The main ingredient is ground roasted peanuts, for which peanut butter can act as a substitute. Other typical ingredients include coconut milk, soy sauce, tamarind, galangal, garlic, and spices (such as coriander seed or cumin). Other possible ingredients are chili peppers, sugar, fried onion, and lemongrass. The texture and consistency of a peanut sauce mainly reflect the amount of water being mixed in it.

== Regional ==
=== Indonesia ===
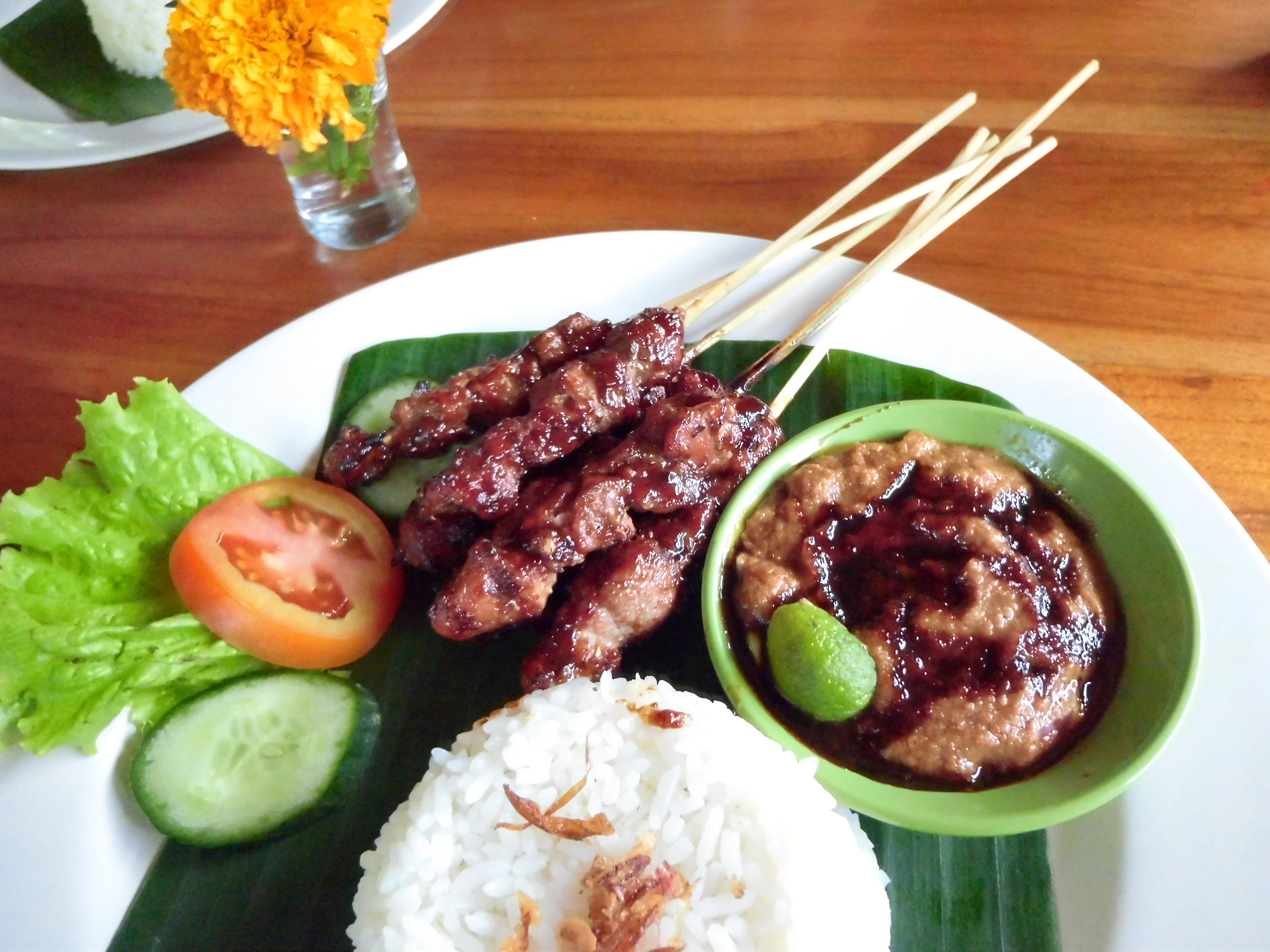
Satays are commonly served with peanut sauce, a name which has rubbed off onto the sauce.

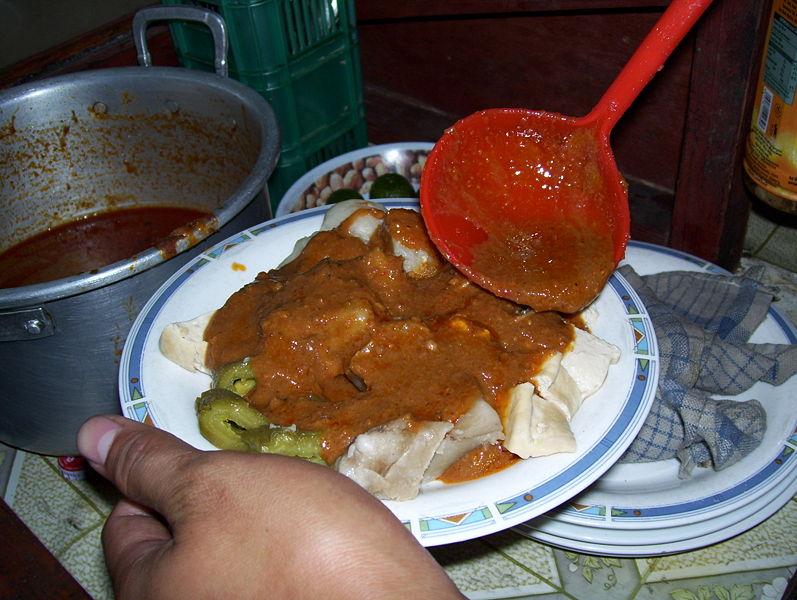
Indonesian siomay is served with peanut sauce.

Peanuts were introduced from the Americas by Spanish merchants into Indonesia in the late 16th century. Peanuts thrived in the tropical environment of Southeast Asia. In Indonesian cuisine, they are found roasted and chopped in dishes and in marinades, and as dipping sauces.

Bumbu kacang (peanut sauce) features in many Indonesian signature dishes, such as satay, gado-gado, karedok, ketoprak, rujak and pecel, or Chinese-influenced dishes such as siomay. It is usually added to main ingredients (meat or vegetables) to add taste, used as dipping sauce such as sambal kacang (a mixture of ground chilli and fried peanuts) for otak-otak, or as a dressing on salads. Satay, a popular Southeast Asian street food, is a dish commonly presented as skewered, grilled meat served with peanut sauce. Its popularity has caused the name "satay" to be used to describe both the sauce and the dish.

In sauces, fried peanuts are often combined with gula jawa (palm sugar), garlic, shallot, ginger, tamarind juice, lemon juice, lemongrass, salt, chilli, pepper, and kecap manis (sweet soy sauce). Combinations of these ingredients are ground together and mixed with coconut milk or water. Indonesian peanut sauce tends to be less sweet than its Thai adaptation.

=== Netherlands ===
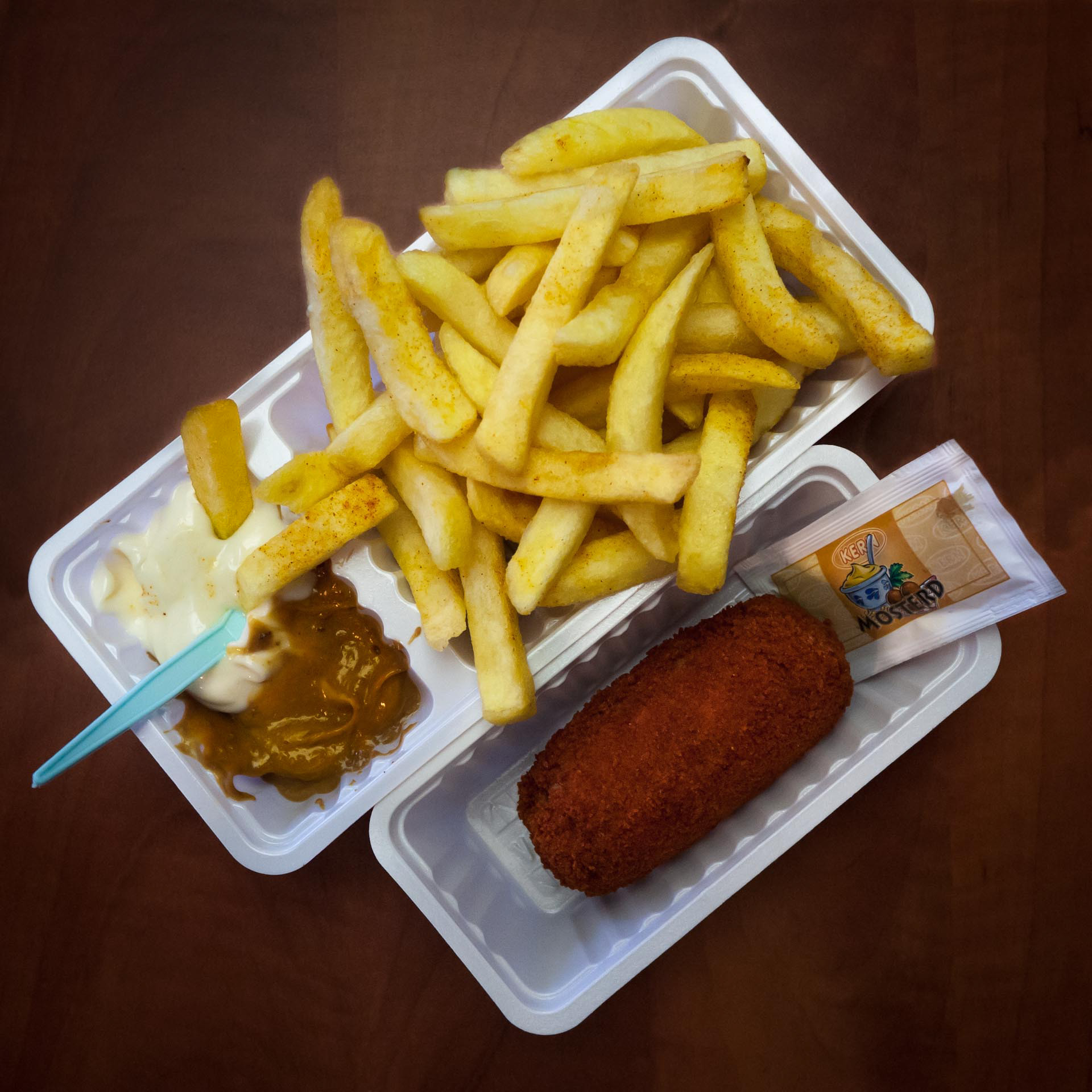
Patatje oorlog, fries served with peanut sauce and mayonnaise in the Netherlands

Peanut sauce reached the Netherlands through its former colonization of South East Asia. Besides being used in certain traditional Indonesian and Dutch-Indonesian dishes, it has found its way into a purely Dutch context as a condiment when it is eaten during, for instance, a (non-Asian style) barbecue or with French fries. A popular combination at Dutch fast food outlets is French fries with mayonnaise and peanut sauce (often with raw chopped onions and with ketchup or Dutch currysauce), called a patatje oorlog (lit. 'Fries War'). Peanut sauce is also eaten with baguette, bread, cucumber or potatoes. It is also used as an ingredient in the deep-fried snack food called satékroket, a croquette made with a flour-thickened ragout based on Indonesian satay.

=== Other countries ===
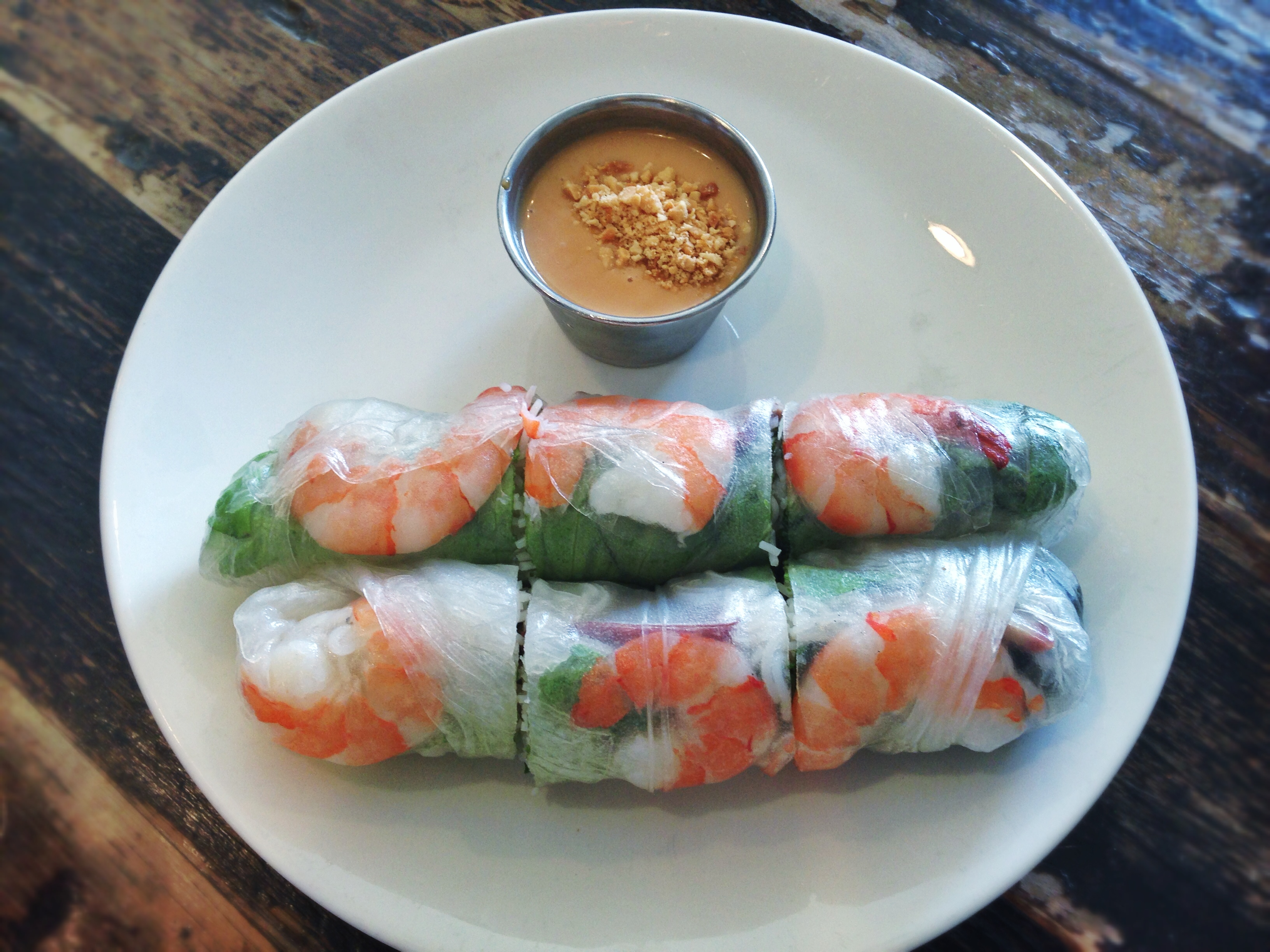
Spring rolls with peanut sauce for dipping

- Malaysia cuisine includes peanut sauces similar to Indonesian cuisine. Javan, Minang, Bugis and other ethnic groups had immigrated from Dutch East Indies into the British-controlled Malay peninsula, Sarawak and Sabah before independence. Most have assimilated as Malays and enriched the Malay cuisine. Dishes such as the peanut sauce and rendang were modified to become Malaysianised versions similar yet different to the original Indonesian dishes.
- In Chinese cooking, the derivative sauce is often used in Chaoshan-style hot pot.
- In Hong Kong, among the many dishes using this sauce is satay beef noodles, very common for breakfast in cha chaan tengs.
- In India, groundnut chutney (spicy peanut sauce) is served along with breakfast, such as idli and dosa. Variations include palli chutney (spiced whole peanut chutney) in Andhra Pradesh and kadalai chutney in Tamil Nadu.
- In the Philippines, peanut sauce is known as sarsa ng mani and is used as a dipping sauce for satay and for different varieties of lumpia, as well as the base for kare-kare.
- In Singapore, peanut sauce is not only used as dipping sauce for satay. It is also eaten with rice vermicelli known as satay bee hoon.
- In Vietnam, it is called tương đậu phộng and is used in cuốn diếp. The Vietnamese variation also contains hoisin sauce.

== See also ==
- List of peanut dishes
- List of sauces
- Peanut butter
- Peanut chutney
- Salsa de maní
- Sambal
- Shacha sauce
- Siu haau sauce
