= Smoked scallop =

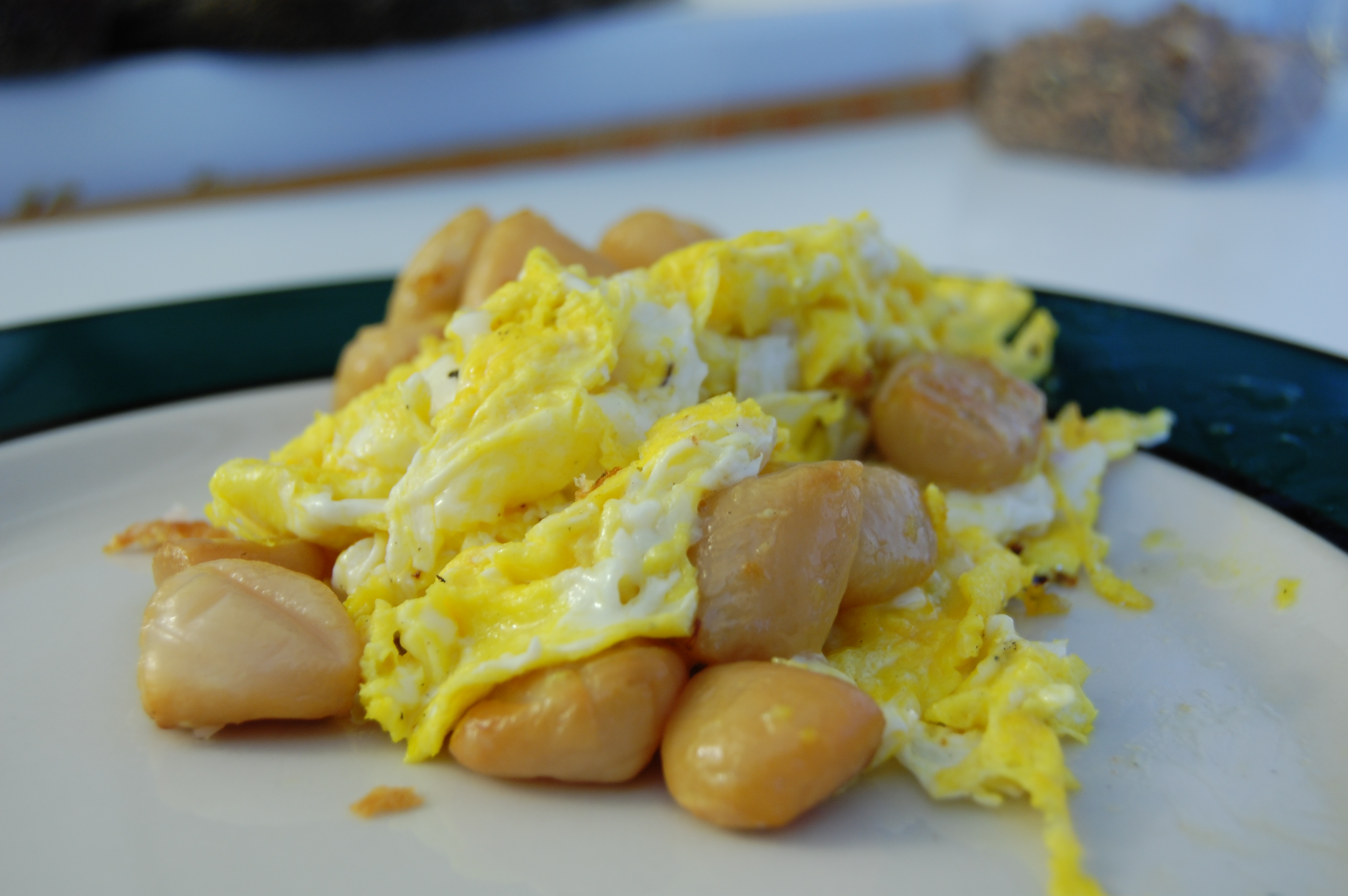
Smoked scallops and eggs

Smoked scallops are scallops that have been smoked. A scallop is a common name applied to many species of marine bivalve mollusks in the family Pectinidae, the scallops. Scallops are a cosmopolitan family, found in all of the world's oceans.

Smoked scallops have been described as delicious in part due to how the mollusk absorbs the smoky flavor "better than just about any other seafood". They have also been described as having a firm and chewy texture and consistency. They are sometimes served as appetizers or as an ingredient in the preparation of various dishes and appetizers. They are also sometimes used to add flavor to a dish, such as grating smoked scallop over the top of a dish to finish it.

== Dish examples ==
Smoked scallop dishes

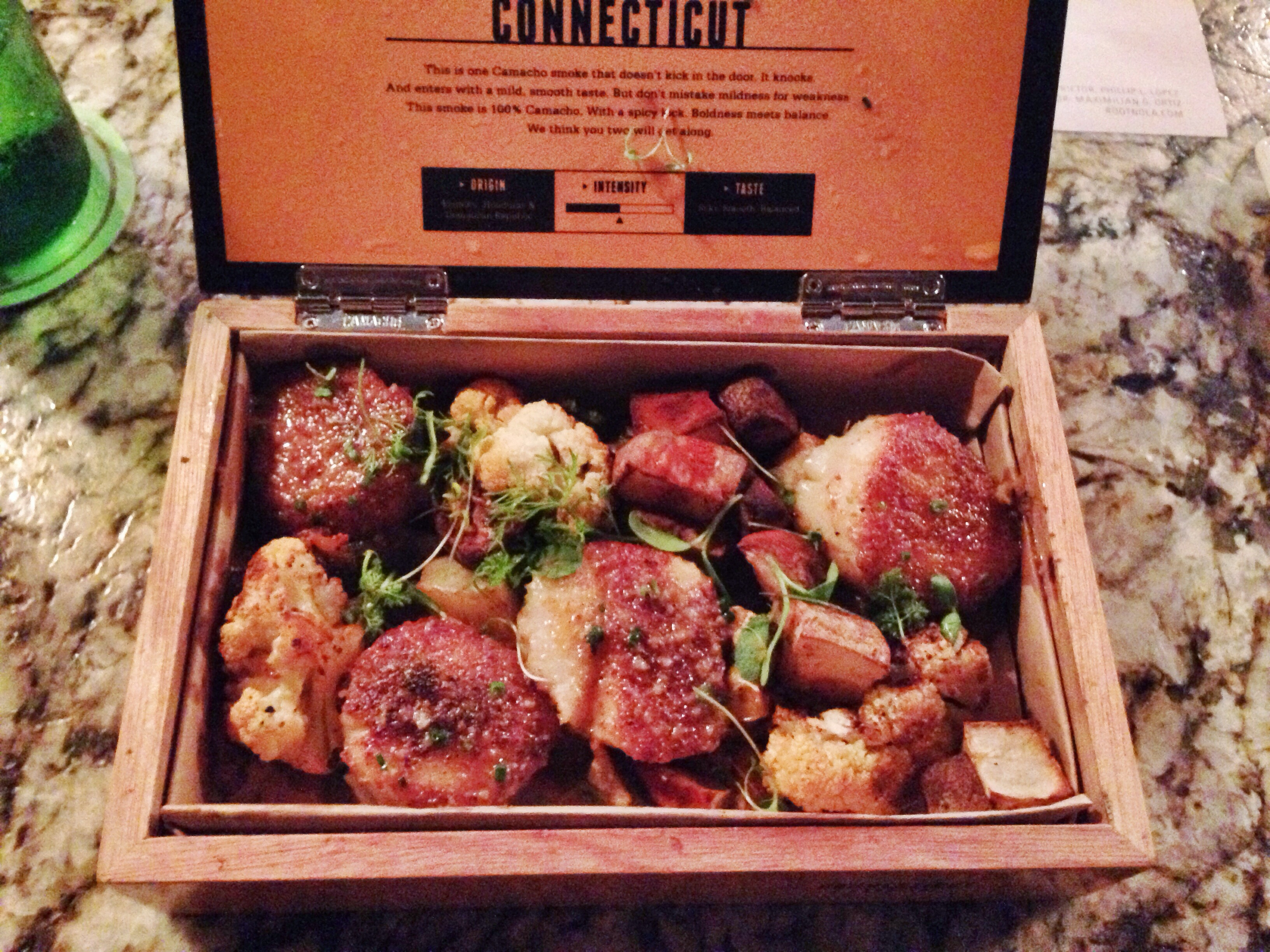
Smoked scallops and other smoked foods

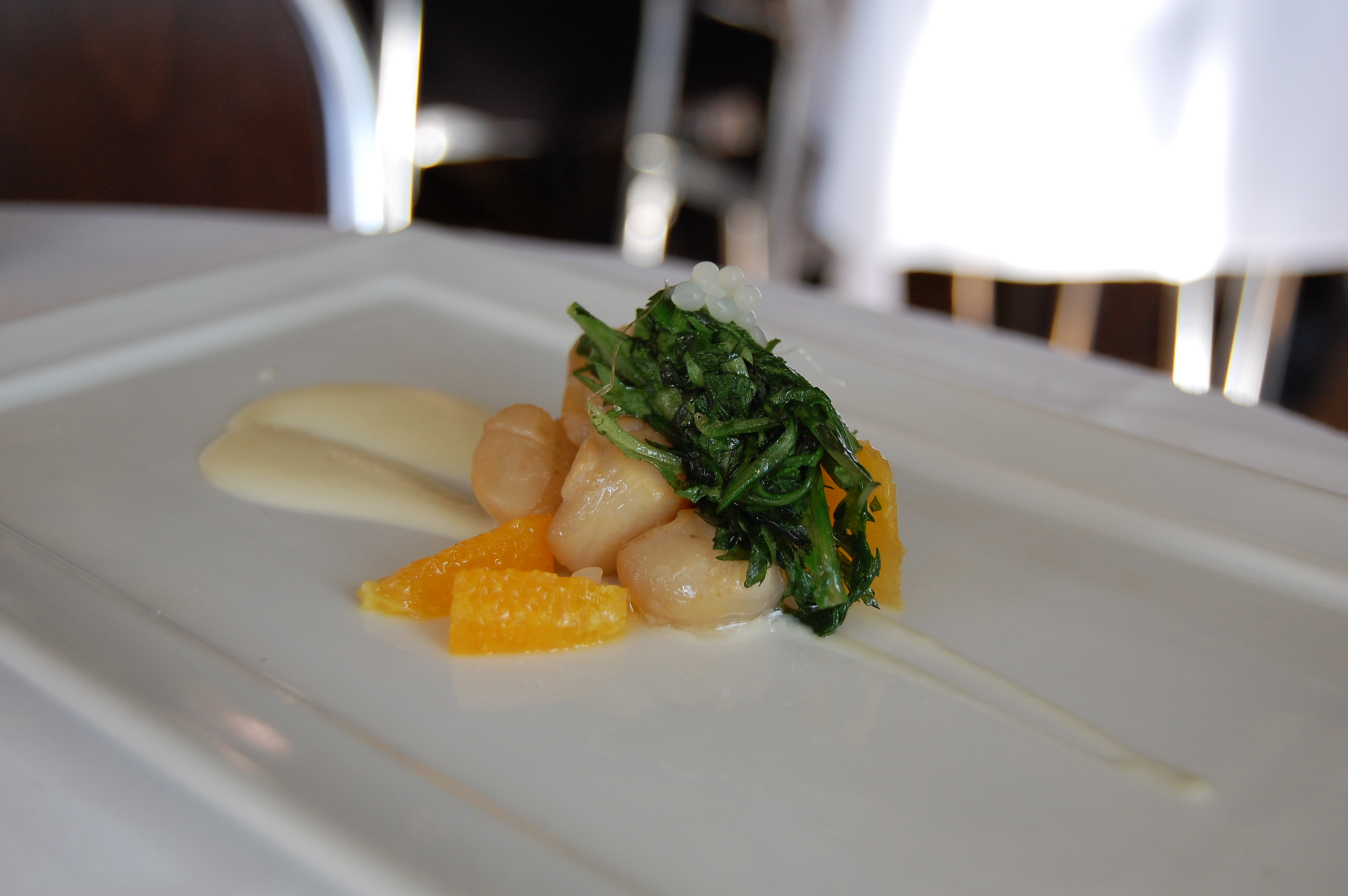
A smoked scallop appetizer

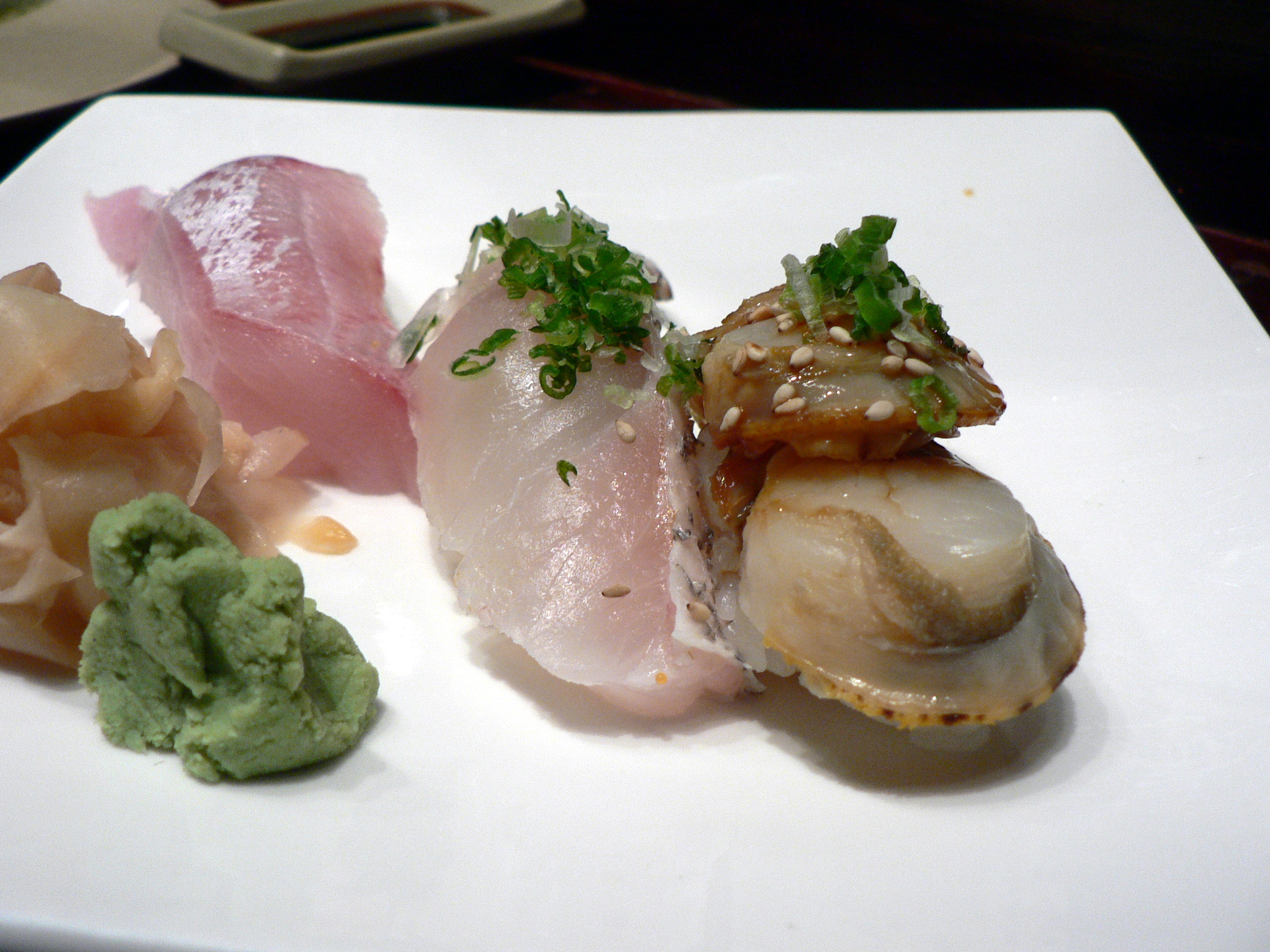
A seafood appetizer with a smoked baby scallop on the far right

== See also ==
- Conpoy – a type of dried seafood product made from the adductor muscle of scallops.
- List of edible molluscs
- List of smoked foods
- Scallop – as food
- Smoked oyster
