= Wing Wah =

Hong Kong restaurant chain

Wing Wah 榮華

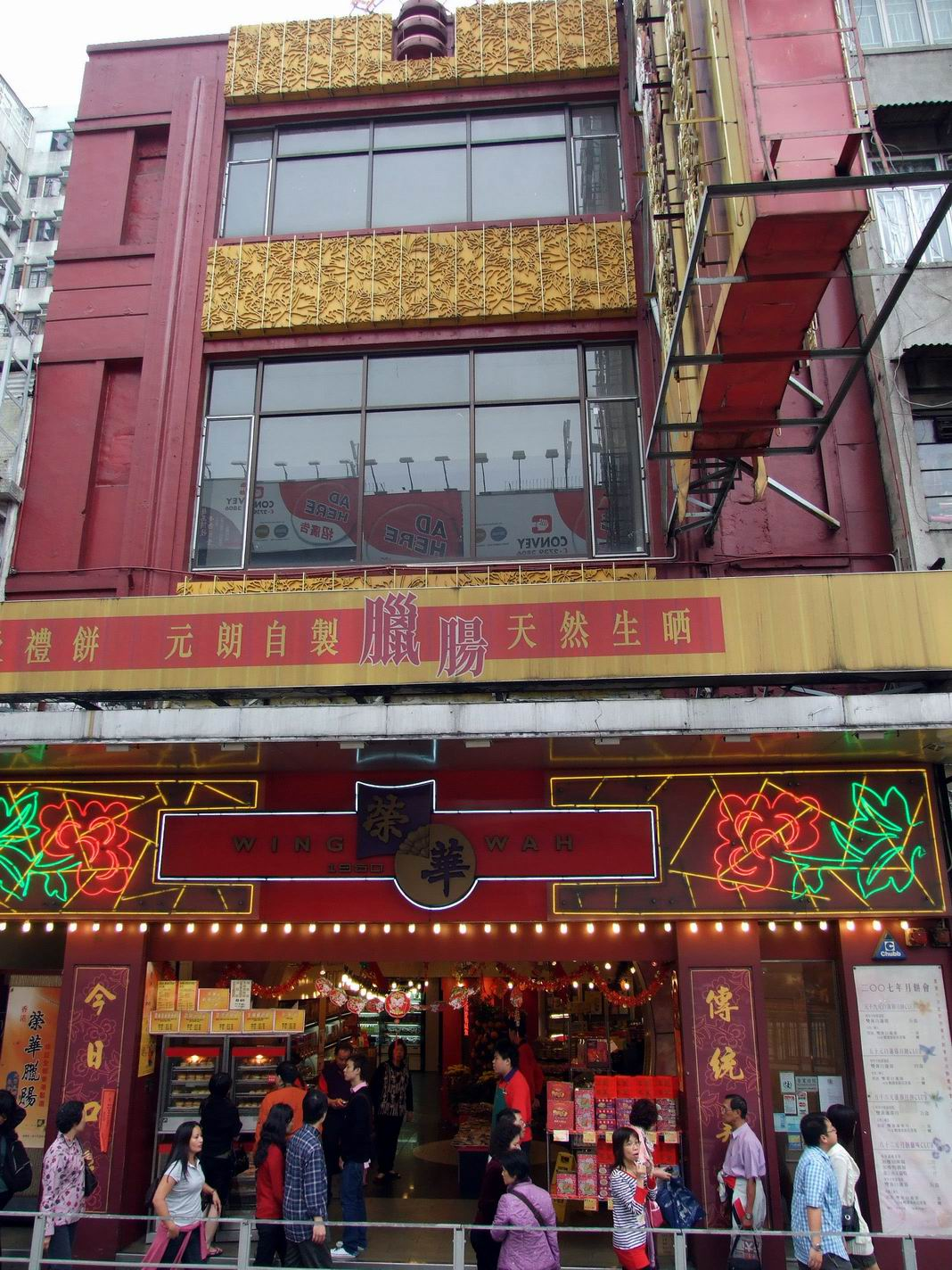
- Flagship restaurant in Yuen Long
- Industry: Food and Beverage
- Founded: 1950
- Founder: Lau Pui Ling 劉培齡; Chiu Lut-sau 趙聿修
- Headquarters: Hong Kong
- Number of locations: 50+
- Products: Moon Cake
- Parent: Wing Wah Food Manufactory Limited (榮華食品製造業公司)
- Website: http://www.wingwah.com/eng/

Wing Wah Food Manufactory Limited
- Traditional Chinese: 榮華食品製造業有限公司
- Simplified Chinese: 荣华食品制造业有限公司
- Cantonese Yale: Wìngwà Sihkbán Jaijouhyihp Yáuhhaahn Gūngsī
Transcriptions
Yue: Cantonese
- Yale Romanization: Wìngwà Sihkbán Jaijouhyihp Yáuhhaahn Gūngsī
- Jyutping: Wing4waa4 Sik6ban2 Zai3zou6jip6 Jau5haan6 Gung1si1

Wing Wah
- Traditional Chinese: 榮華
- Simplified Chinese: 荣华
- Cantonese Yale: Wìngwà
Transcriptions
Yue: Cantonese
- Yale Romanization: Wìngwà
- Jyutping: Wing4waa4

Wing Wah (Chinese: 榮華) is a Hong Kong–based restaurant chain and food manufacturer owned by Wing Wah Food Manufactory Limited (榮華食品製造業有限公司). The company is most renowned for its mooncakes, and also produces: Chinese sausage, cakes, and teas.

== History ==
The company was first established in 1950 by Lau Pui Ling 劉培齡 and 趙聿修. The Wing Wah restaurant started trading in a four-story building in Yuen Long which included a retail shop which sold its mooncakes. The business was incorporated in 1962. In 1963, it launched a new mooncake made from white lotus paste. The Wanchai branch was opened in 1967, and a larger restaurant was opened in Yuen Long in 1975.

The retail side of the business has grown, with branches all over Hong Kong selling Chinese sausage, cakes, and teas. In the 1990s, the company built the eponymous Wing Wah Centre in its home district of Yuen Long, and continued opening shops in high traffic areas such as Hong Kong International Airport, and a multimedia tea museum at Ngong Ping on Lantau.

== Development ==
In 1960s, Hong Kong Wing Wah Cake Shop mainly concentrated on its bakery business and was reorganised into a limited liability company. A manufacturing plant was established in Hong Kong with the introduction of various kinds of automated production machines to upgrade overall product quality.

In the 1970s, Wing Wah founded its own retail outlets at different locations, including Hong Kong Island, Kowloon and the New Territories, in order to actively expand and promote its business. During this period, the company also began to expand its sales into international markets, selling mooncakes in over 100 major cities in mainland China, United Kingdom, United States, Canada, Australia, New Zealand and other Southeast Asian countries.

In the 1980s, Wing Wah began to focus on the China market. Until now, Wing Wah mooncakes have reached as far as Inner Mongolia and Harbin.

In late 90s, it was the first Chinese cake shop to open up retail branches at the Hong Kong International Airport.

== Products ==
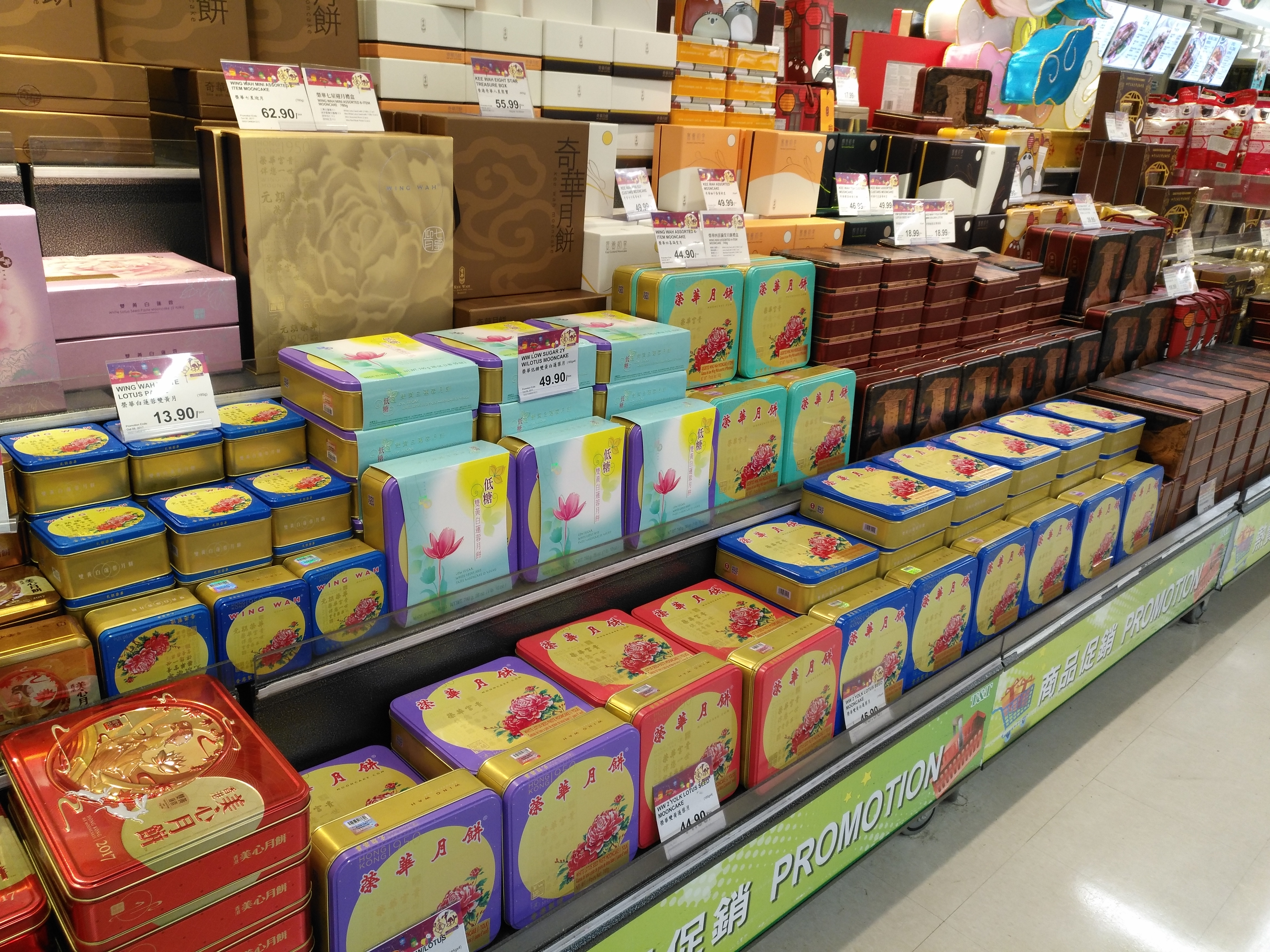
Wing Wah Moon Cake

- Moon Cake Series
- Icy Moon Cake Series (Snow skin mooncake)
- Chinese Preserved Sausage Series
- Chinese Cakes
- Chinese Wedding Cake
- Chinese Tea Series
- Seasonal Food

== Contribution ==
Wing Wah Cake Shop has participated in various charitable activities. Since 1989, "community mooncakes" are made every Mid-Autumn Festival to raise money for charity. All funds raised are donated to The Community Chest of Hong Kong.
