= Hoisin sauce =

Sauce commonly used in Chinese cuisine

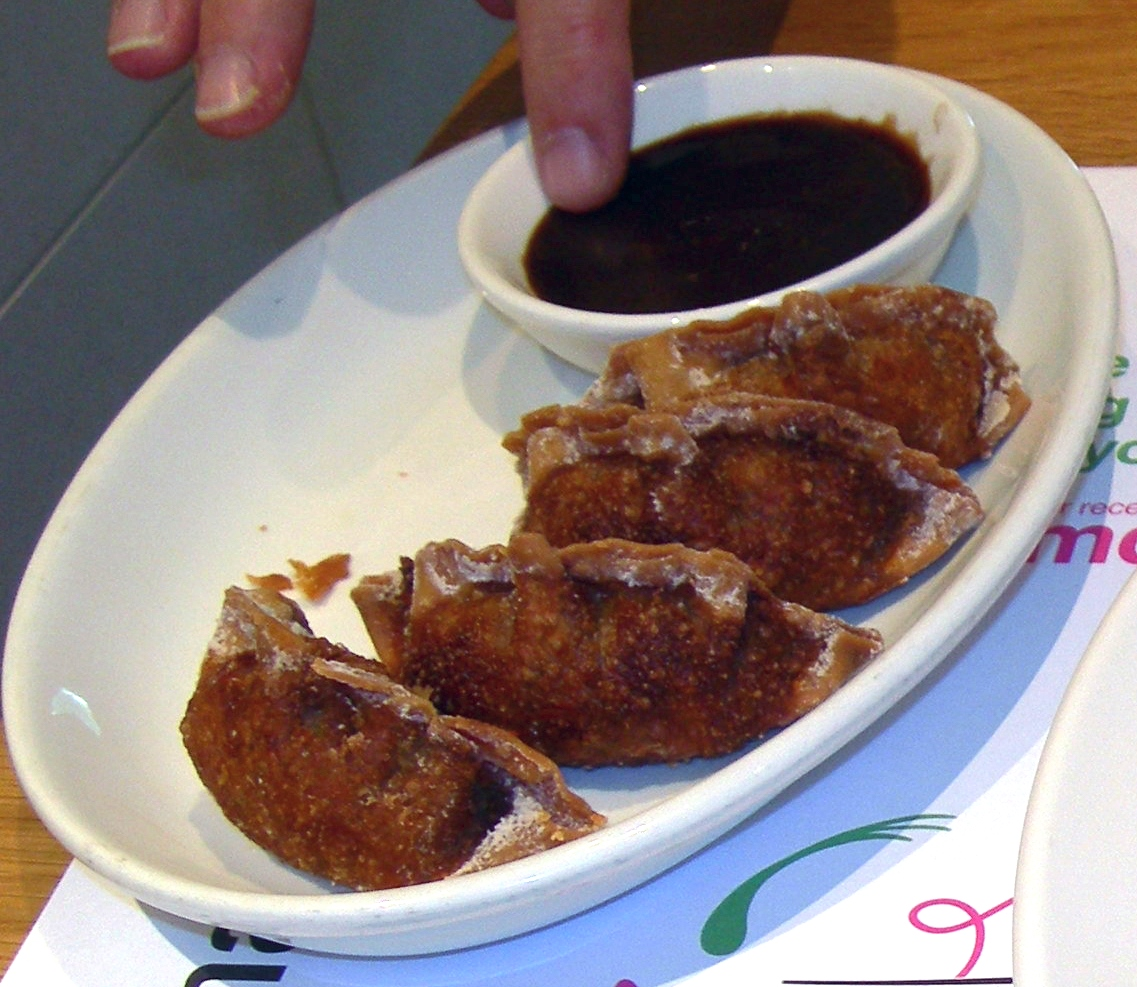
- Deep-fried jiaozi with hoisin sauce

Chinese name
- Traditional Chinese: 海鮮醬
- Simplified Chinese: 海鲜酱
- Literal meaning: seafood sauce
Transcriptions
Standard Mandarin
- Hanyu Pinyin: hǎixiānjiàng
- IPA: [xàɪɕjɛ́ntɕjɑ̂ŋ]
Yue: Cantonese
- Yale Romanization: hói sīn jeung
- Jyutping: hoi^{2} sin^{1} zoeng^{3}
- IPA: [hɔ̌ːi síːn tsœ̌ːŋ]
Southern Min
- Hokkien POJ: hái-sian-chiùⁿ
- Tâi-lô: hái-sian-tsiùnn

Vietnamese name
- Vietnamese alphabet: tương đen
- Hán-Nôm: 醬𪓇
- Literal meaning: black sauce

Hoisin sauce is a thick, savory sauce originating in China. It features in many Chinese cuisines, but is most prominent in Cantonese cuisine. It can be used as a glaze for meat, an addition to stir fry, or as dipping sauce. It is dark-coloured, sweet and salty. Although regional variants exist, hoisin sauce usually includes soybeans, fennel, red chili peppers, and garlic. Vinegar, five-spice powder, and sugar are also commonly added.

== Name ==
The word hoisin is derived from the Cantonese pronunciation of the Chinese words for "seafood" (simplified Chinese: 海鲜; traditional Chinese: 海鮮; Cantonese Yale: hói sīn; pinyin: hǎixiān), although the sauce does not contain any seafood ingredients and is not commonly consumed with seafood. The reason for the name is "seafood flavour", a common adjective in Chinese cuisine, especially Sichuanese ("fish fragrant").

== Ingredients ==
The key ingredient of hoisin sauce is fermented soybean paste.

Some hoisin sauce ingredients include starches such as sweet potato, wheat and rice, and water, sugar, soybeans, sesame seeds, white distilled vinegar, salt, garlic, red chili peppers, and sometimes preservatives or coloring agents. Traditionally, hoisin sauce is made using toasted mashed soybeans.

== Uses in regional cuisines ==
=== Chinese cuisine ===
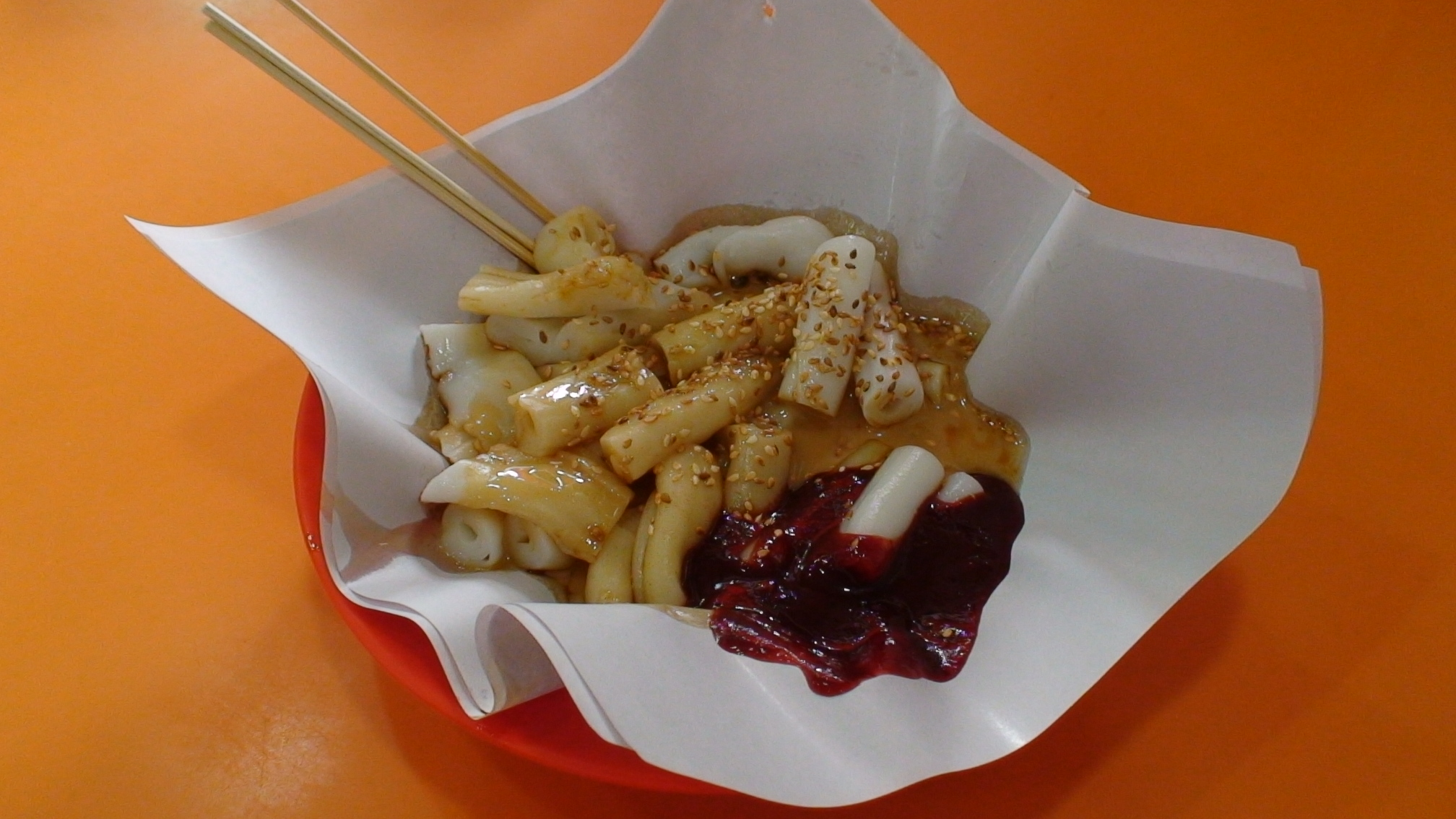
Plain cheung fun with hoisin sauce and sesame seed sauce

Hoisin sauce is used in Cantonese cuisine as a marinade sauce for meat such as char siu, or as a dipping sauce for steamed or panfried rice noodle roll (cheung fun 肠粉).

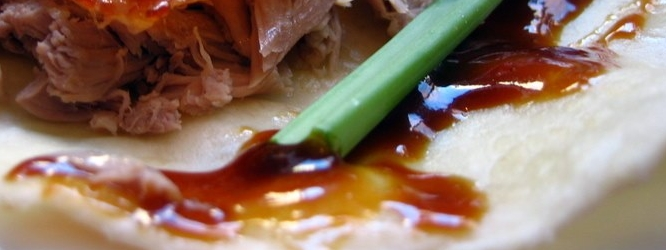
Hoisin sauce on a Peking duck wrap

Hoisin sauce is used as a dipping sauce for Peking duck and lettuce wraps. Hoisin sauce is used as a dipping sauce for moo shu pork.

=== Vietnamese cuisine ===
In Vietnamese, hoisin sauce is called tương đen. It is a popular condiment for phở, a Vietnamese noodle soup, in southern Vietnam. The sauce can be directly added into a bowl of phở at the table, or it can be used as a dip for the meat of phở dishes. In phở, hoisin is typically accompanied by Sriracha sauce or tương đỏ. The hoisin sauce is also used to make a dipping sauce for Vietnamese gỏi cuốn (often translated as 'summer roll') and other similar dishes. In cooking, it can be used for glazing broiled chicken.

== See also ==
- Duck sauce
- List of dips
- List of Chinese sauces
- List of sauces
- Oyster sauce
- Plum sauce
- Siu haau sauce, primary Chinese barbecue sauce
- Soy sauce
- Sweet and sour sauce
