= List of Chinese sauces =

This is a list of notable Chinese sauces, encompassing sauces that originated in China or are widely used as cooking ingredients or condiments in Chinese cuisines mostly consisting of soy bean sauce and brown sugar.

== Chinese sauces ==
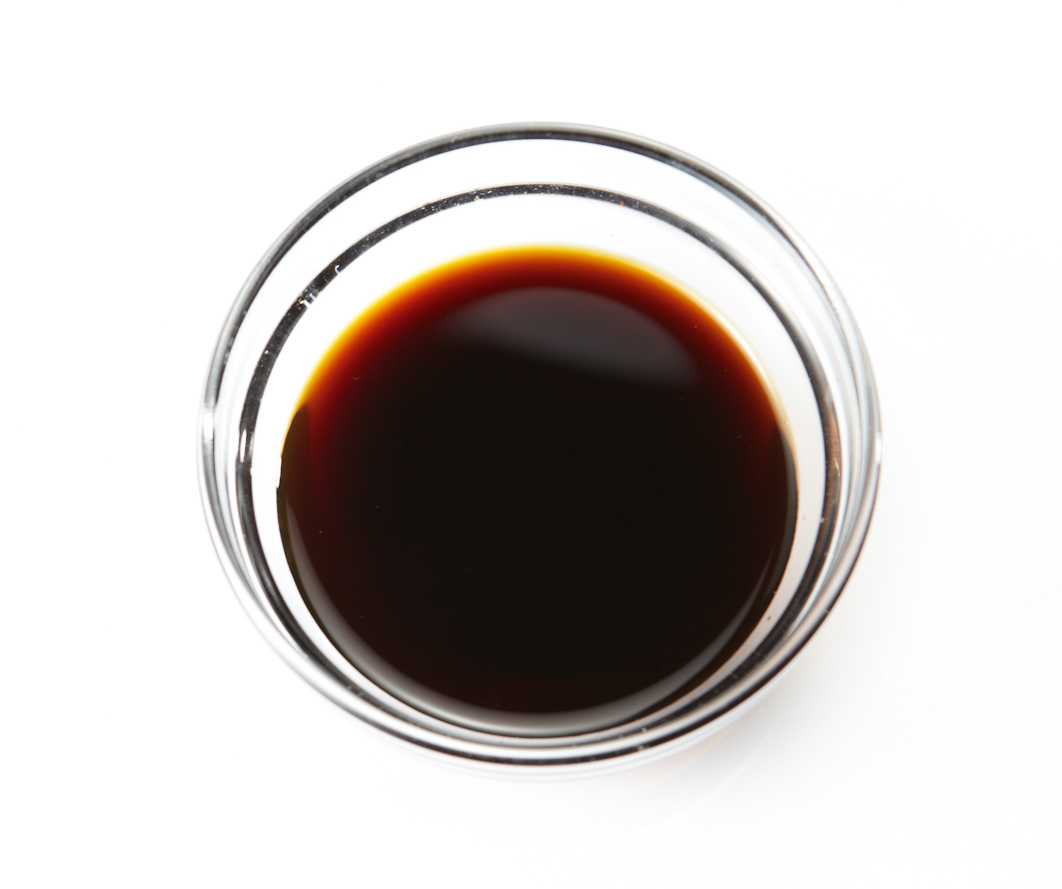
Soy sauce

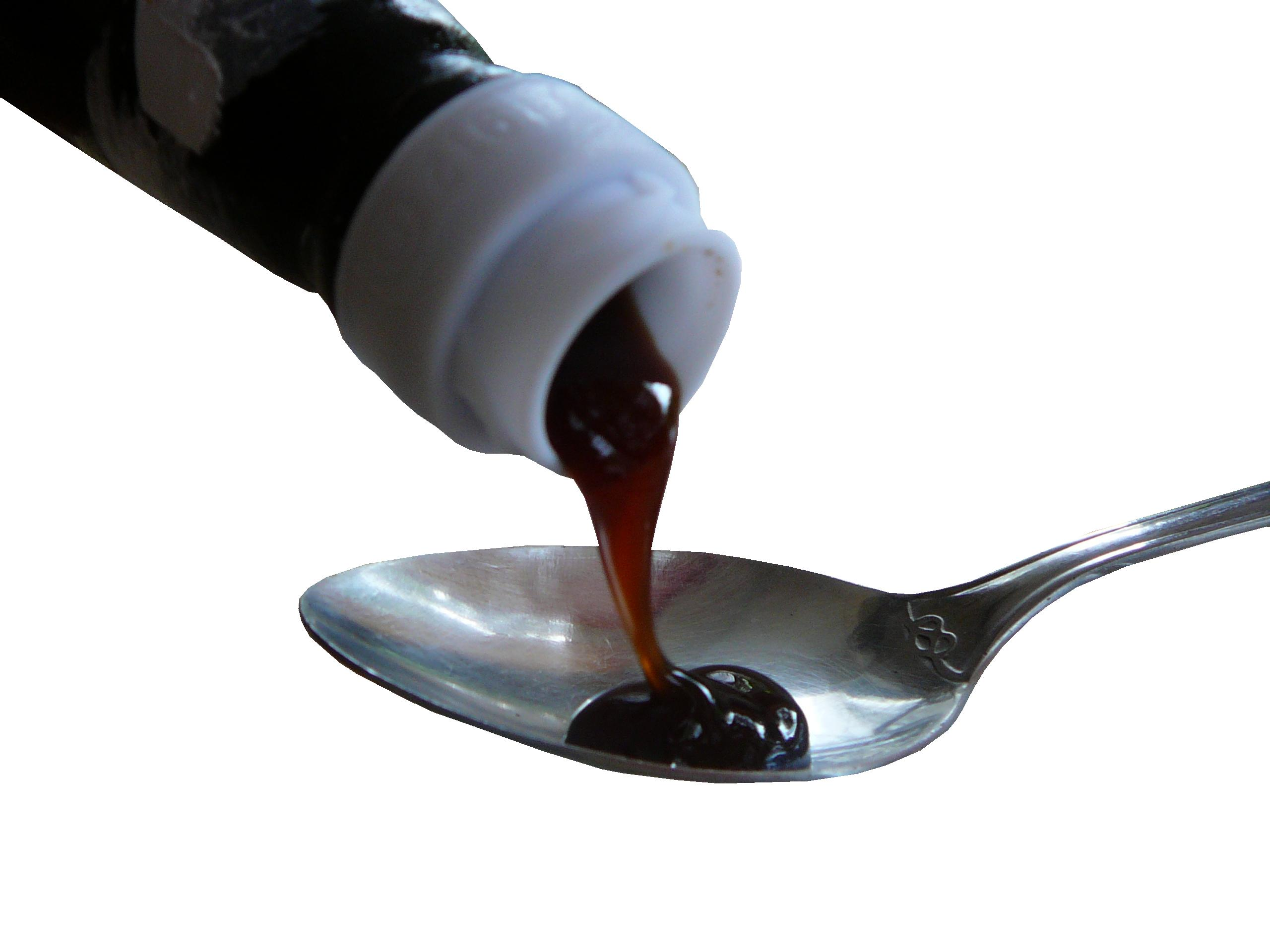
Oyster sauce

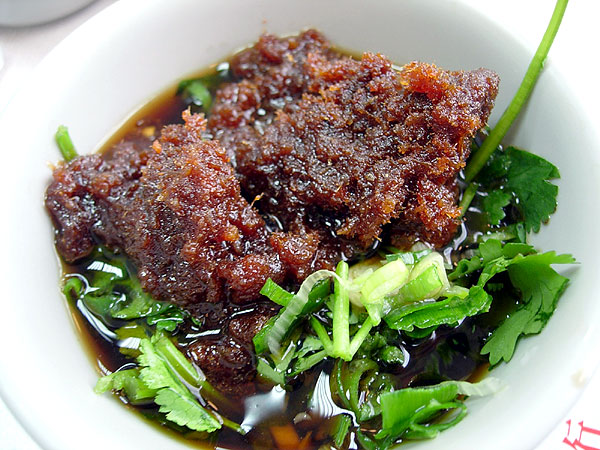
Shacha sauce in a bowl with coriander to be used in a hot pot

These sauces are commonly used as ingredients for dishes in many Chinese cuisines. There may also be regional variations on the sauces, such as seasoned soy sauce or fermented bean curd.

- Light soy sauce (生抽) – a lighter-colored salty-flavored sauce used for seasoning
- Dark soy sauce (老抽) – a darker-colored sauce used for color
- Seasoned soy sauce – usually light soy sauce seasoned with herbs, spices, sugar, or other sauces
- Sweet bean sauce (甜面酱) – a thick savory paste
- Oyster sauce (蚝油)
- Fermented bean curd (腐乳) – usually cubes of tofu, and sometimes other spices and seasonings, which are used as a condiment or marinade along with some of the brine
- Douchi (豆豉) – fermented black beans, usually in a brine
- Cooking wine (料酒)
- Sesame oil (香油)
- Black vinegar (陈醋)
- White vinegar (白醋)

=== Cantonese cuisine ===
- Haixian sauce (海鲜酱, Cantonese: hoisin)
- XO sauce – a spicy seafood sauce that originated from Hong Kong. It is commonly used in Cantonese cuisine.
- Shao kao sauce (烧烤酱, Cantonese: siu haau) – a thick, savory, slightly spicy barbecue sauce generally known as the primary barbecue sauce used within Chinese and Cantonese cuisine.
- Shacha sauce (沙茶酱) – A sauce or paste that is used as a base for soups, hotpot, as a rub, stir fry seasoning and as a component for dipping sauces.
- Cha shao sauce (叉烧酱, Cantonese: char siu)
- Plum sauce (苏梅酱)
- Fish sauce (鱼露)

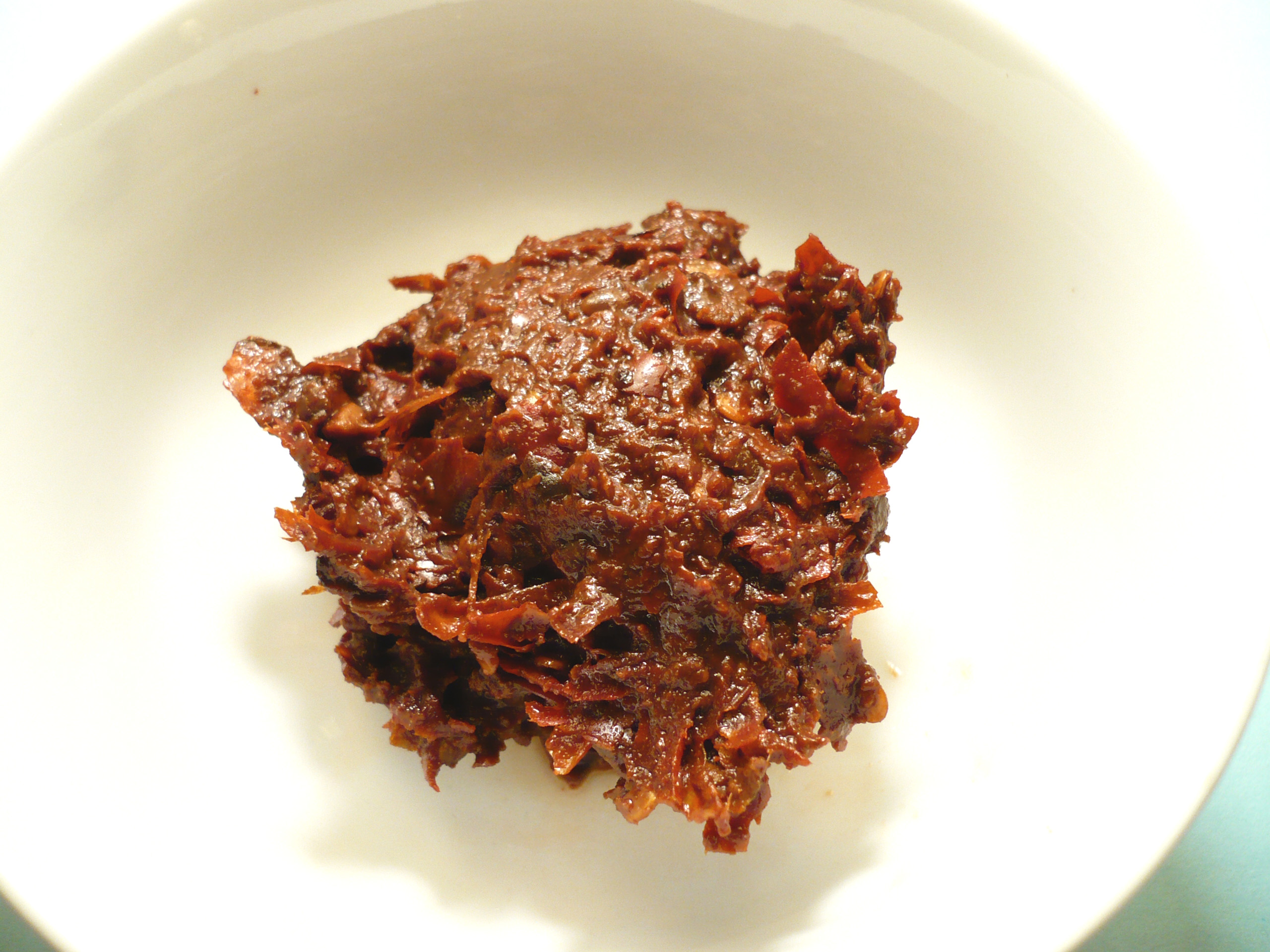
Doubanjiang, the mother sauce of Sichuan cuisine

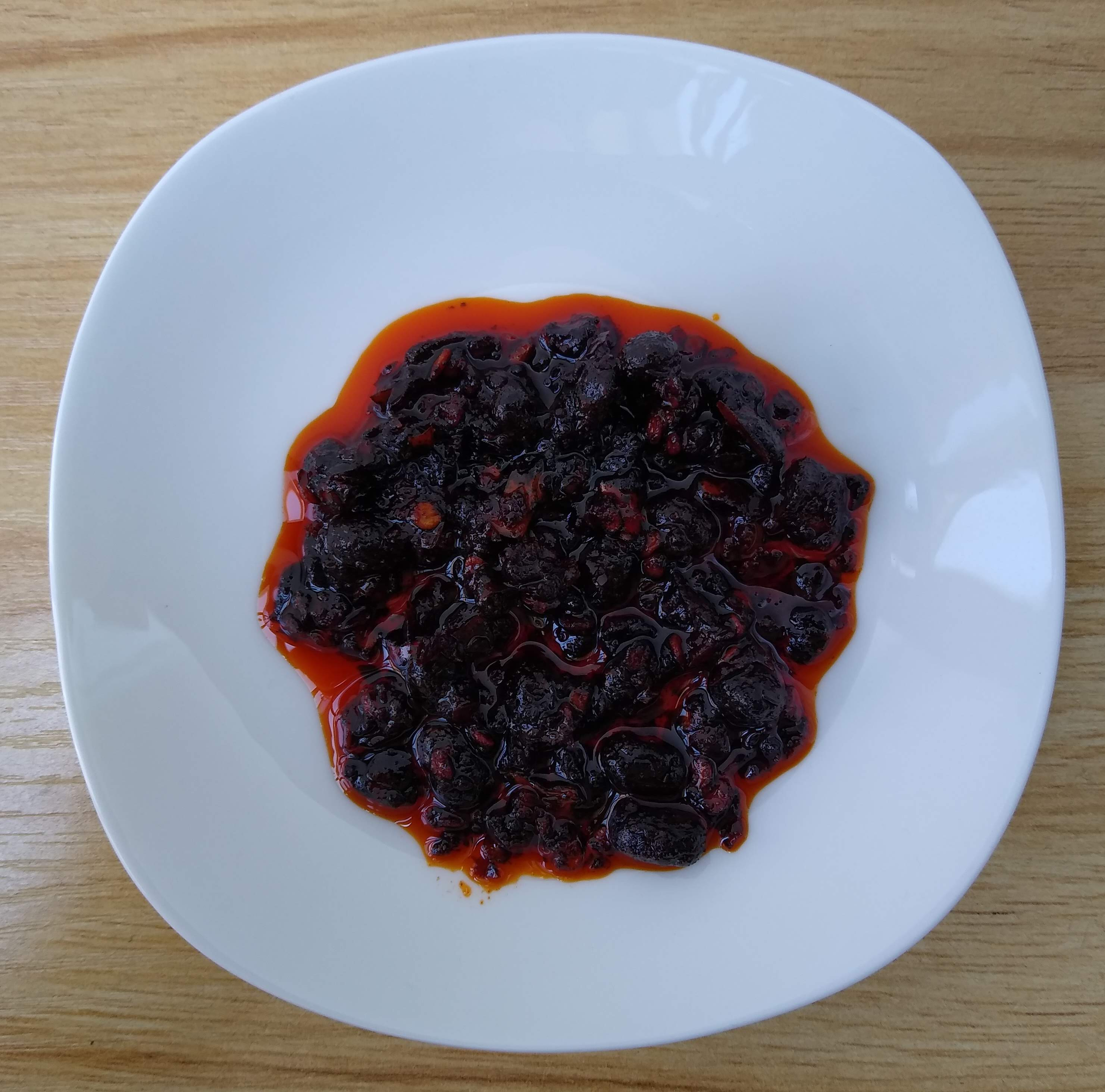
Laoganma, a popular sauce made with oil, chili pepper, and fermented soybeans.

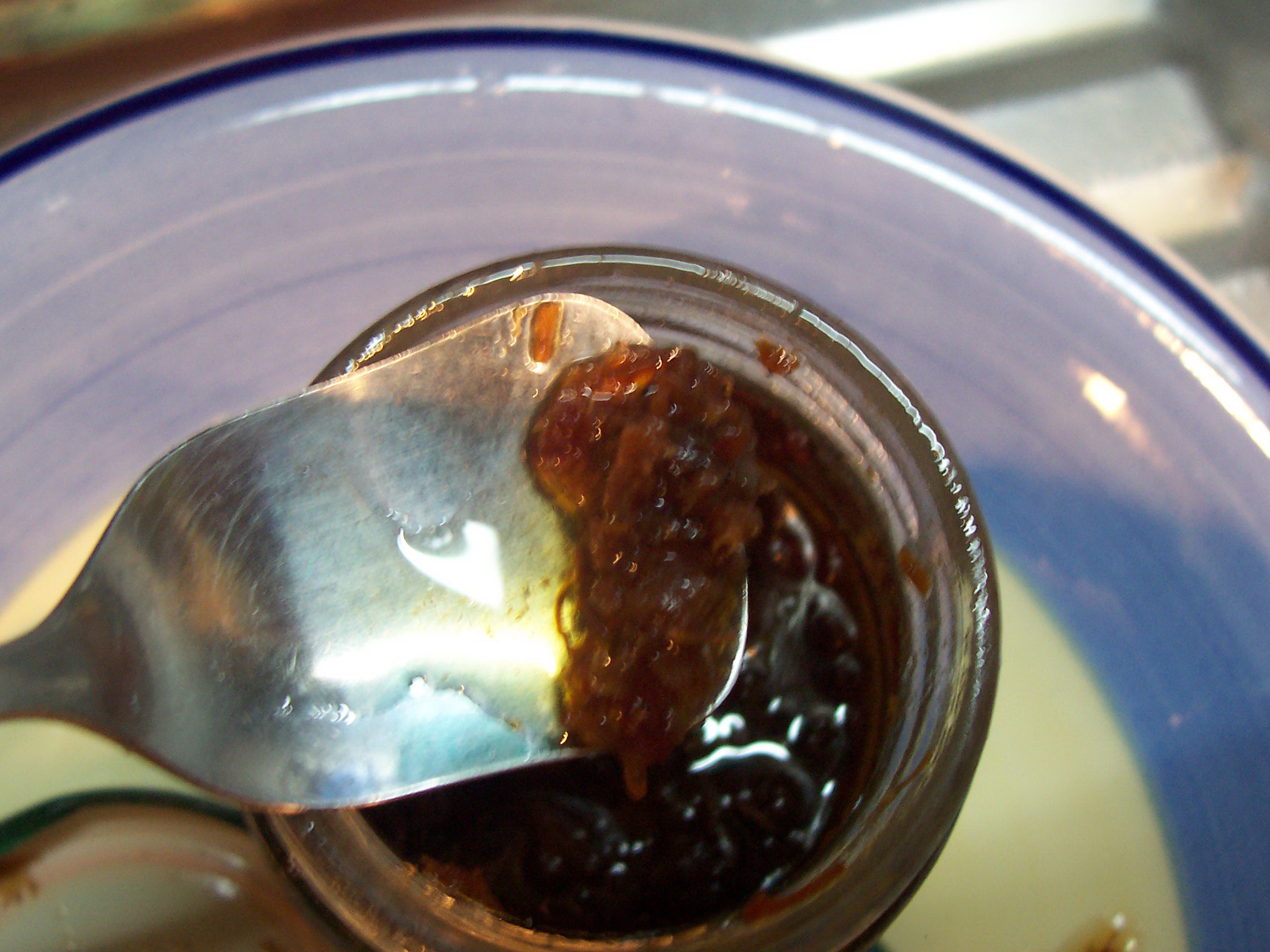
XO sauce

=== Hunan cuisine ===
- Duo jiao (剁椒) – chopped chilis pickled in a sour brine
- Yongfeng chili sauce (永丰辣酱) - finely chopped chilis that are mixed with flour and bean powder and fermented

=== Guizhou cuisine ===
- Ci ba la (糍粑辣)
- Zao la (糟辣)
- Lao guo la (烙锅辣; Lao Gan Ma is a brand of Guizhou lao guo la chili sauces.)

=== Jiangsu cuisine ===
- Rib sauce (排骨酱)

=== Northern Chinese cuisines ===
- Sesame paste (麻酱)
- Fermented bean paste/Yellow bean paste (黄酱)
- Garlic chive flower sauce (韭花酱)

=== Sichuan cuisine ===
- Doubanjiang (豆瓣酱) – a mix of fermented beans, chilis, salt, and flour used for flavor and color
- Chili oil (红油) – usually made by pouring hot oil that has been seasoned with spices onto ground chili flakes and left to steep

==== Notable exceptions ====
While doubanjiang can be considered the "mother sauce" of Sichuan cuisine, there are some prominent flavors in modern Sichuan cooking that are often referenced as sauces but are composed of other ingredients and sauces during cooking. These include:

- Yuxiang (魚香)
- Mala (麻辣)
- Guaiwei (怪味)

=== Taiwanese cuisine ===
- Soy sauce paste

== See also ==
- Chinese pickles
- List of Chinese desserts
- List of Chinese dishes
- List of Chinese soups
- List of sauces
