= Goodway =

Goodway may refer to:

== Arts and entertainment ==
- Mayor Goodway, a character in Paw Patrol

== People ==
- Andy Goodway (born 1961), British former professional rugby league footballer and coach
- Beverley Goodway (1943–2012), British photographer
- Cyril Goodway (1909–1991) was an English cricketer
- David Goodway (born 1942), British historian
- Martha Goodway is an American metallurgist,
- Russell Goodway (born 1955) is a Welsh Labour Party councillor and former Lord Mayor of Cardiff

== Places ==
- Goodway in Monroe County, Alabama, United States.
