= Shacha sauce =

Chinese condiment

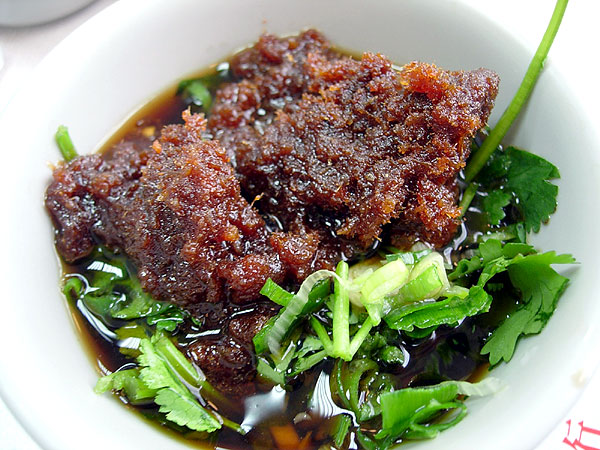
- Place of origin: China

Shacha sauce (Chinese: 沙茶; Pe̍h-ōe-jī: sa-te) is a savory, slightly spicy Chinese condiment used in Minnan cuisine (primarily Teochew, Hokkien, and Taiwanese). It is made from soybean oil, garlic, shallots, chili, Chinese brill, and dried shrimp. It is also sometimes sold as "Chinese barbecue sauce".

Shacha sauce is used many different ways; as a soup base for shacha noodles, a barbecue meat rub, a dipping sauce (for hotpot), or a seasoning for stir-fries. It is also included with instant noodles manufactured in Vietnam, in their own packet alongside packets of soup base, dried vegetables, or other seasonings.

== Origin ==
Shacha is pronounced sa-te in the Teochew and Hokkien dialects, reflecting its origins in satay sauce introduced by expatriate Min Nan people returning to China from Southeast Asia. During the 20th century, Teochew immigrants in Southeast Asia adapted satay sauce to local tastes, including the introduction of dried seafood. Shacha is now quite different from the peanut-based satay sauce popular in Malaysia and Indonesia. Following the Chinese Civil War, Teochew immigrants resettled in Taiwan and introduced shacha sauce to the Taiwanese culinary repertoire. One in particular, Liu Lai-chin, a Tainan-based noodle shop owner originally from Chaoshan, created the iconic Bullhead brand (牛頭牌) of shacha sauce in 1958. In the 1960s and 1970s, as beef consumption slowly gained cultural acceptance in Taiwan, shacha sauce became more popular among locals.

== See also ==
- List of Chinese sauces
- Siu haau sauce
- Peanut sauce
- XO sauce
- Shito – Similar condiment used in Ghana
