= Siu haau sauce =

Cantonese barbecue sauce

- Traditional Chinese: 燒烤醬
- Simplified Chinese: 烧烤酱
- Literal meaning: barbecue sauce
Transcriptions
Standard Mandarin
- Hanyu Pinyin: shāokǎo jiàng
Yue: Cantonese
- Jyutping: siu1 haau1 zoeng3

Siu haau (pinyin: shāokǎo) sauce is the primary barbecue sauce used in Cantonese cuisine. It generally contains garlic, honey, palm sugar, five-spice powder, and pepper.

Siu haau is used during the barbecue-cooking process as opposed to a flavoring sauce after the food is made. It is not used for siu mei rotisserie-style cooking; dishes such as char siu each have their own sauce.

== See also ==
- Shacha sauce
- List of Chinese sauces
- List of sauces
