= Char siu =

Cantonese style of barbecued pork

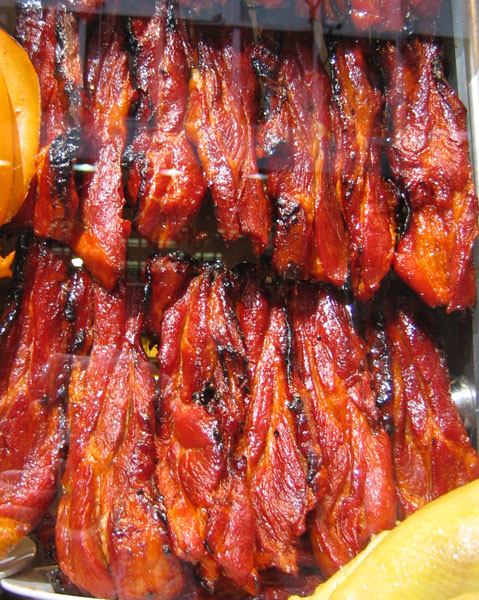
- A rack of char siu hanging in the window of a siu mei shop.
- Alternative names: chasu, chashao, cha sio, chāshū (Japanese), xá xíu (Vietnamese)
- Place of origin: Guangdong, China
- Region or state: Greater China, Southeast Asia, and Japan
- Main ingredients: Pork, mixture of maltose or honey, Chinese wine and five-spice powder

Chinese name
- Traditional Chinese: 叉燒
- Simplified Chinese: 叉烧
- Jyutping: caa1 siu1
- Hanyu Pinyin: chāshāo
- Literal meaning: "fork roasting"
Transcriptions
Standard Mandarin
- Hanyu Pinyin: chāshāo
- IPA: [ʈʂʰá.ʂáʊ]
Hakka
- Romanization: cha-seu
Yue: Cantonese
- Yale Romanization: chāsīu
- Jyutping: caa1 siu1
- IPA: [tsʰa˥.siw˥]
Southern Min
- Hokkien POJ: chha-sio

Vietnamese name
- Vietnamese: xá xíu

Thai name
- Thai: หมูแดง [mǔː dɛ̄ːŋ]
- RTGS: mu daeng

Korean name
- Hangul: 차시우
Transcriptions
- Revised Romanization: chasiu

Japanese name
- Kanji: 叉焼
- Kana: チャーシュー
Transcriptions
- Romanization: chāshū

Indonesian name
- Indonesian: babi panggang merah / Cha Sio

Khmer name
- Khmer: សាច់ជ្រូកអាំង

Char siu (Chinese: 叉燒; lit. 'fork roasted') is a Cantonese-style barbecued pork. Originating in Guangdong, char siu and its variations are popular in Hong Kong, Singapore, Malaysia, Philippines, Indonesia, Thailand, Cambodia, Vietnam, and Japan. The dish usually consists of boneless pork shoulder marinated with a mixture of hoisin sauce, soy sauce, Chinese wine, and five-spice powder, and glazed with maltose or honey during the roasting process. Traditionally, the distinctive red colour was due to the use of red fermented bean curd and red yeast rice, however red food colouring is now commonly used.

Char siu can be eaten with rice, noodles, or used as an ingredient for other dishes, such as stuffing for buns and pastries. It is typically sold in siu mei (燒味) establishments that specialise in Cantonese roasted meat. In Hong Kong, char siu can be found from local fast-food chains to high-end restaurants, and is widely considered to be a comfort food.

== Names ==
The word char siu is from Cantonese, and means 'fork roasted'. It can also be spelled cha siu.

The word for char siu is spelled differently across Southeast Asia and Japan. Alternative spellings include char siew, chāshū, char sio and xá xíu, while other languages call it mu daeng (Thai) and sach chrouk sa seev (Cambodian).

== Ingredients and preparation ==
Char siu is typically made from a boneless cut from the collar or shoulder of domestic pork, known as mui tau (梅頭). The meat is marinated with a mixture of hoisin sauce, soy sauce, Chinese rose wine and five-spice powder. Chinese rice wine may also be used. Other typical ingredients in the marinade include chu hou sauce, shallots, spring onions, ginger and sugar. Maltose or honey is used to give char siu its high sugar content and characteristic shiny glaze.

Traditionally, the distinctive red colour was due to the use of red fermented bean curd and red yeast rice, however red food colouring is now commonly used.

The proportion of fat and lean meat is considered extremely important to the flavour and preparation of char siu. Other common cuts include pork loin, pork belly, pork butt, and pork neck end (jyu geng yuk). Pork belly produces juicy and fattier char siu, pork butt produces leaner char siu, and pork neck end results in very marbled char siu.

== Variations ==
=== Cantonese ===
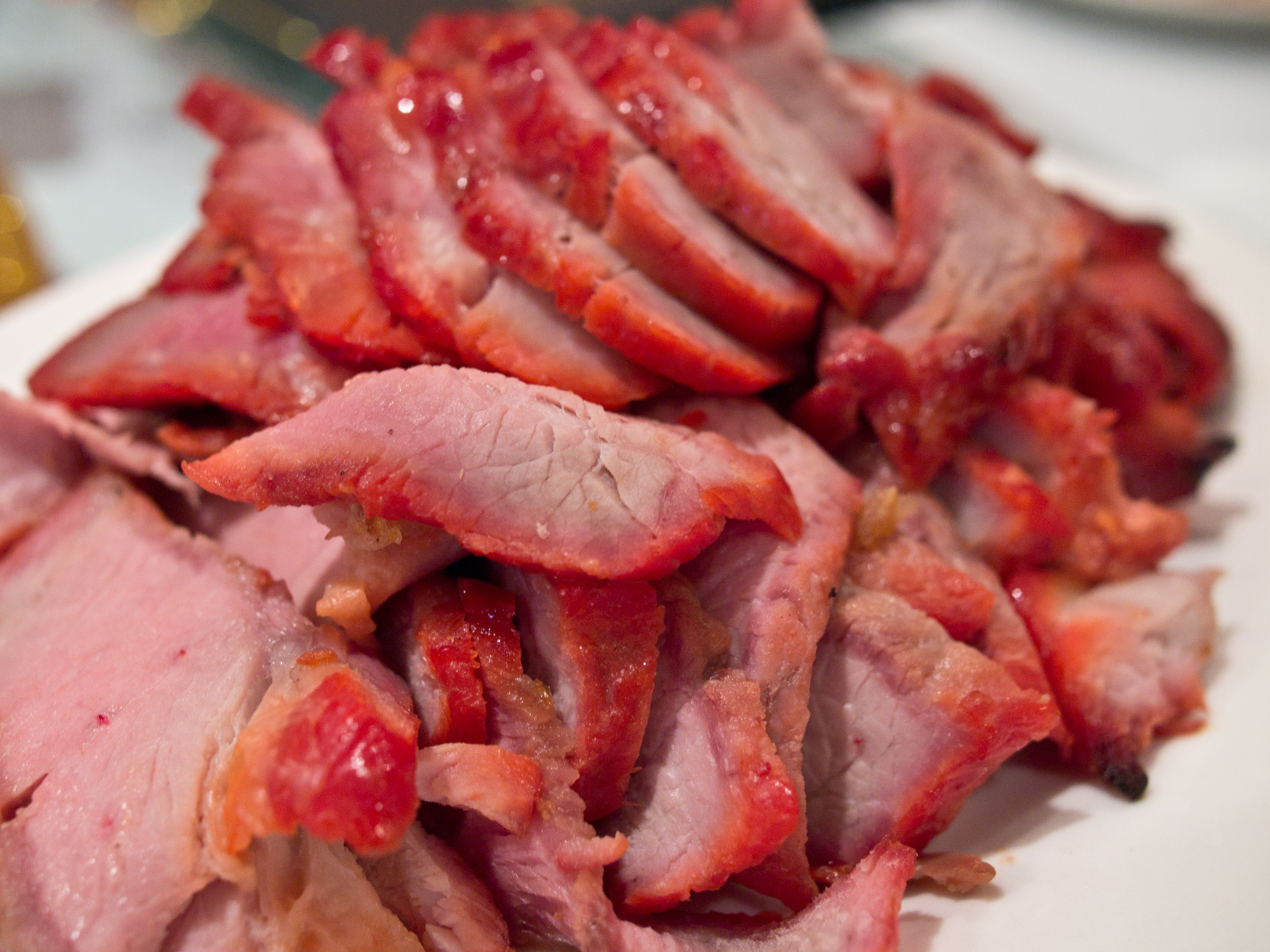
Sliced char siu

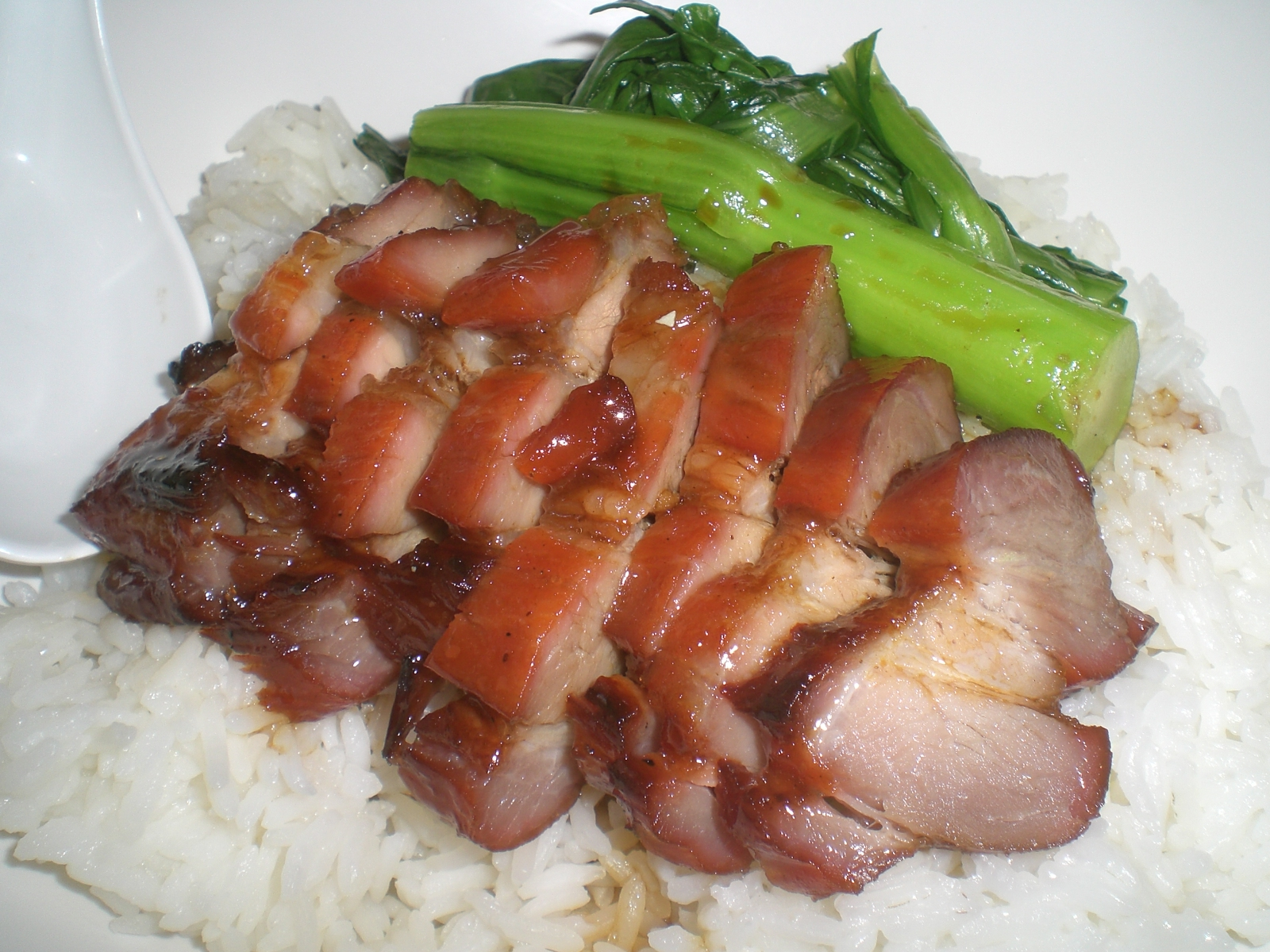
A plate of char siu rice

Char siu is one of the most iconic dishes of Cantonese cuisine. It is typically consumed with a starch as a main dish, whether with noodles (chasiu min, 叉燒麵), with rice (chasiu faan, 叉燒飯), or served alone as a main dish in traditional family meals or during yum cha at a restaurant. It is typically served sliced in thin strips. Beyond these pairings, char siu is also a popular filling in Cantonese dim sum, such as inside cha siu bao (叉燒包), pastry puffs (chasiu sou, 叉燒酥), or in cheung fun (chasiu cheong, 叉燒腸). It is also a common filling in pineapple buns.

The ovens used to roast char siu are usually large gas rotisseries. Since ovens are not standard appliance in Hong Kong households, char siu is usually purchased from a siu mei establishment, which specialises in meat dishes such as char siu, soy sauce chicken, white cut chicken, roasted goose, and roasted pork. These shops usually display the merchandise by hanging them in the window. Customers can request that the char siu be cut into thick or thin slices, or not cut at all.

While char siu is traditionally made with pork from local Chinese pig breeds, many high-end restaurants in Hong Kong prefer to use Black Iberian pork (known as 西班牙黑毛豬 or "Spanish Black Pigs") due to their high fat content resulting in a tender mouthfeel. However, some chefs argue that the marination process is sufficient to tenderise the meat and prefer pork from local pig breeds for a local dish.

=== Southeast Asian ===
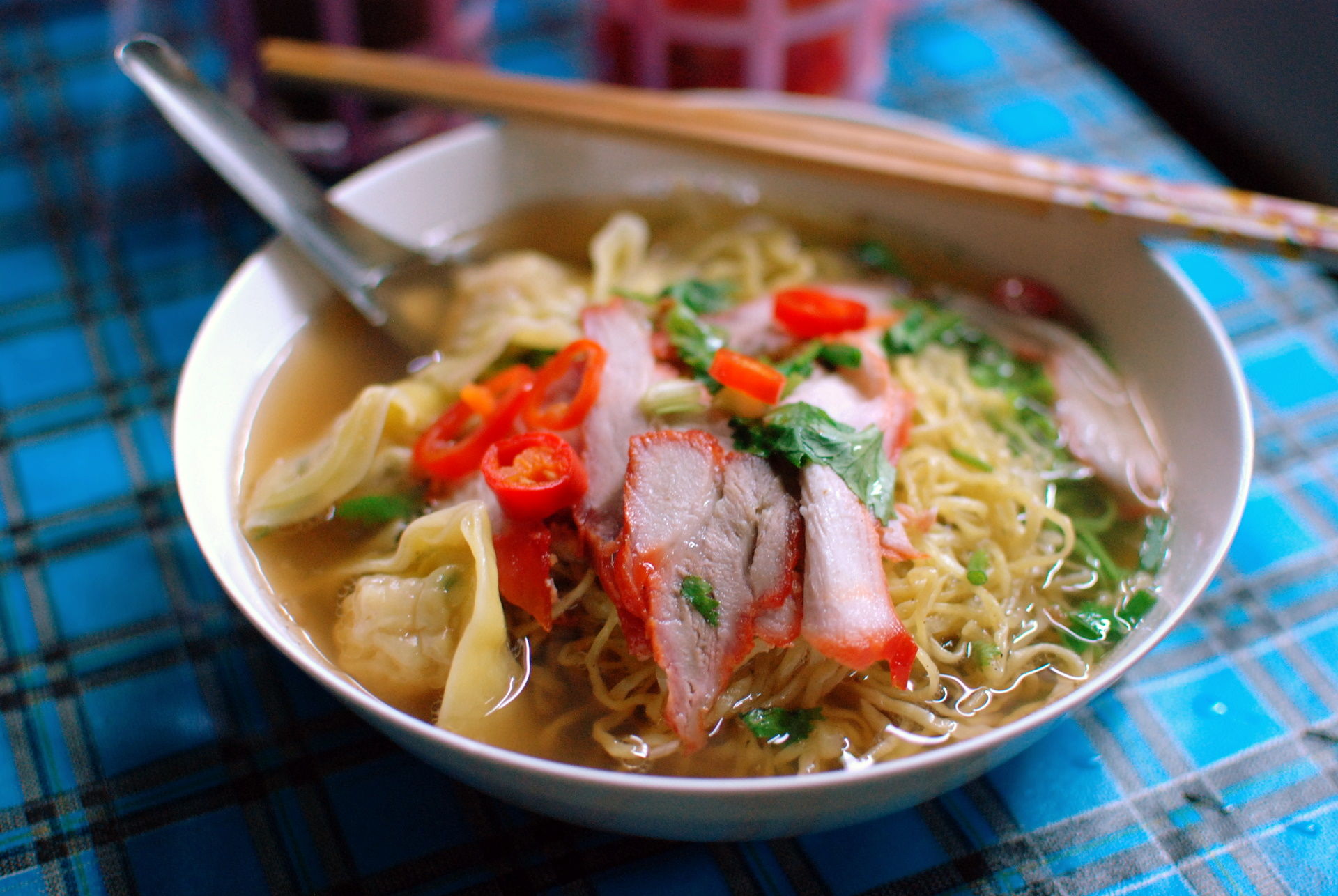
Char siu is often served in a noodle soup, as here in Chiang Mai, Thailand.

In Malaysia, Singapore, Indonesia, Cambodia, Thailand, and Vietnam, char siew rice is found in many Chinese shāolà (燒臘 or 烧腊) stalls along with roast duck and roast pork. The dish consists of slices of char siu, cucumbers, and white rice, drenched in sweet gravy or drizzled with dark soy sauce. Char siu rice is also a well-known food within the Chinese community in Medan, North Sumatra, where it is more often called char sio.

In Singapore, char siew rice can also be found in Hainanese chicken rice stalls, where customers have a choice of plain white rice or chicken-flavoured rice served with their char siu rice, and choose from garlic, chilli and soy sauces.

In Thailand, char siu is called mu daeng (Thai: หมูแดง, pronounced [mǔː dɛ̄ːŋ], "red pork") and served over rice as Khao mu daeng. In Cambodia it is called sach chrouk sa seev (Khmer: សាច់ជ្រូកសាស៉ីវ, sac cruuk sa səyv).

In the Philippines, it is known as Chinese pork asado, but also referred to as cha siu. It is usually eaten with cold cuts or served stuffed in siopao.

In Flanders and Holland, it is sometimes mistaken for the Chinese/Indonesian name 'babi panggang'. This is a different dish (mostly sweeter and served with yellow pickled Chinese cabbage, called atjar). These Chinese/Indonesian restaurants also sometimes serve cha(r) sieuw under the original name.

=== Japanese ===
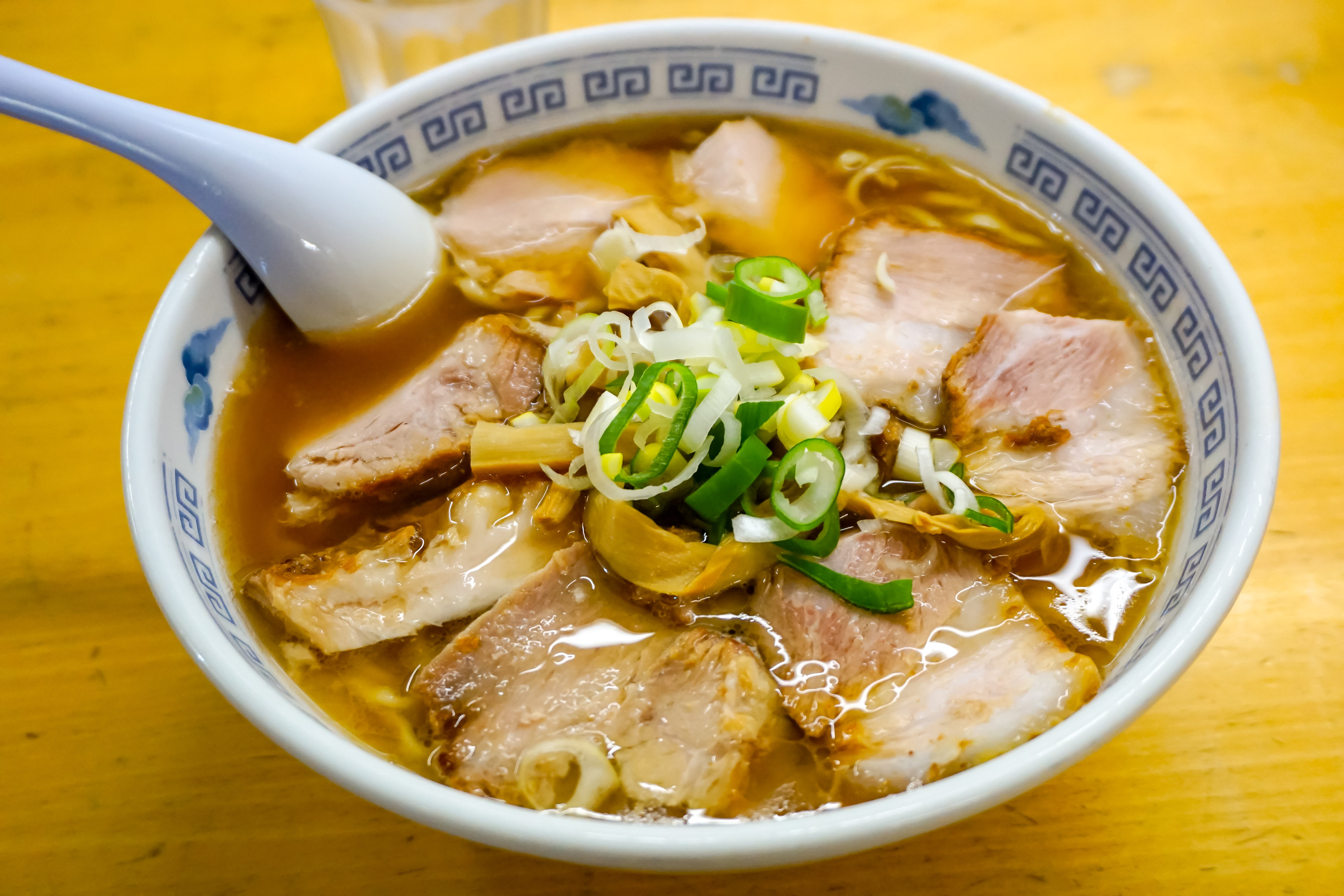
Chāshū ramen

Japanese cuisine has adapted 叉燒 as chāshū (チャーシュー), and the term is used to refer to Cantonese-style char siu, roast pork, and boiled pork. Roast chāshū is known as yakibuta. In the latter preparation, pork belly, thigh, or shoulder is rolled into a log, tied with twine, and then braised in a soy sauce marinade at a low temperature. This type of braising is a Chinese technique known as red cooking, which imparts a reddish-brown coloration. The Japanese variant omits the red colourants or five-spice powder, and is typically seasoned with soy sauce, sake, mirin and sugar. This method of cooking is preferred for softening the pork. Braised chāshū is a typical ingredient for toppings in rāmen.

While chāshū is typically made from pork, some ramen shops use "chicken chāshū ", which is made from braised chicken. Some regional ramen such as Kasaoka ramen use "chicken chāshū ". In Nagai, Yamagata, horse meat ramen is a regional speciality, featuring ramen topped with chāshū that is made with horse meat.

=== British ===
Char siu is the main ingredient in jar jow, a once-common stir-fry dish from East London.

== History ==
Traditionally, sweet main dishes were not common in traditional Chinese cuisine. The Hong Kong food critic Chan Mong Yan (1910-1997)'s posthumously published book "Culinary Classic" (食經) describes a recipe for char siu with Chinese goldenthread and fermented black beans (黃連豉味叉燒), stating that "the main flavor of the dish is the black bean flavor, so to make char siu fragrant enough, you must choose original flavor black beans." The recipe does not use maltose, but emphasises the "savoury fragrance" (鹹香) and simple black bean flavor of the dish.

In the 1950s, many Cantonese roast meat chefs immigrated to Hong Kong and refined their char siu techniques. During that period, pork belly cuts, known as “tor dei” (拖地, lit. "floor brushing") char siu, made from the local Da Hua Bai pigs and so named because it was said that the pigs were so fat their bellies would brush the floor, was popular. However, its popularity later declined due to increased health consciousness, and the mui tau pork collar cut became the standard cut used for the dish.

As Hong Kong's sauce-making techniques matured, chefs began using sauces such as fermented soybean paste, chu hou sauce, and hoisin sauce to marinate meat, creating their own desired flavours, making "sauce flavor" the main characteristic of char siu. In an effort to increase the aesthetic appeal and customers' appetites, stores began to mix red yeast rice into the originally dark red marinade to brighten the colour. Maltose was added to the marinade and char siu was advertised as "honeyed char siu" (mat6 zap1 caa1 siu1, 蜜汁叉燒), with the sweetness meant to appeal to children. This sweet-and-savoury flavour gained popularity in Hong Kong and became the standard method to prepare char siu.

In the present day, char siu is available from local fast-food chains such as Café de Coral to Michelin-starred restaurants, and is widely considered to be a comfort food. The preference for specific cuts, pork breeds, and styles of roasting has evolved over time.

While char siu is traditionally made with pork from Chinese pigs, many high-end restaurants in Hong Kong prefer to use Black Iberian pork (known as 西班牙黑毛豬 or "Spanish Black Pigs") or other overseas breeds such as the Hungarian Mangalica due to their higher fat content resulting in a tender mouthfeel. However, some chefs argue that the marination process is sufficient to tenderise the meat and prefer pork from local pig breeds for a local dish.

In the past, the charred edges of char siu was nicknamed fo gai (火雞, lit. "fire chicken") and was commonly retained. Due to increasing awareness of the health risks around burnt meat consumption, restaurants began removing them prior to serving or purchase. However, it was reported to have become popular again in 2024. While the pork collar or mui tau cut is commonly used, cuts such as "first cut" (第一刀) char siu, which refers to the tip of mui tau, have also become popular in recent years due to its rarity and distinct texture.

== In culture ==
In Cantonese, the phrase "生嚿叉燒好過生你" ("to birth a piece of char siu would be better than birthing you") is commonly used by parents to scold their children by implying that their children are useless.

In the 1993 crime-horror film film The Untold Story which is based on the Eight Immortals Restaurant murders, the main character processes his victims into cha siu buns.

=== "Sorrowful Rice" ===
The 1996 comedy film The God of Cookery directed by Stephen Chow popularised "Sorrowful Rice" (Chinese: 黯然銷魂飯; pinyin: ànránxiāohún fàn; Jyutping: am2 jin4 siu1 wan4 faan6), or simply char siu egg rice, a dish that consists of char siu and cooked white rice topped with a fried egg and vegetables such as choy sum. In the film, the main character makes this dish in a cooking competition, and the simplicity of the dish and its ingredients is contrasted with his opponent's choice of Buddha Jumps Over the Wall, a complicated and luxurious dish. The dish was became well-known in Hong Kong following the film's release.

== Gallery ==
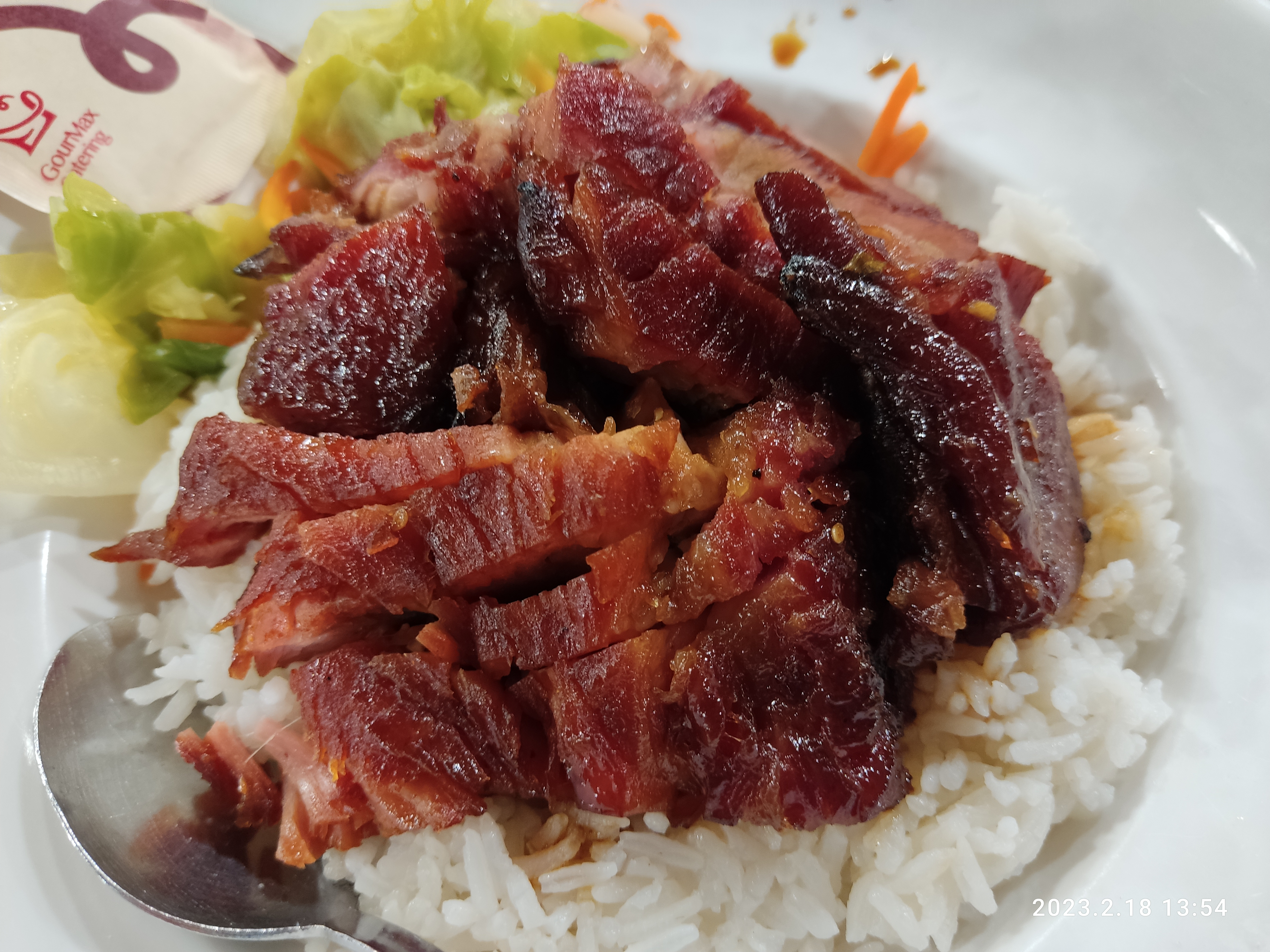
Char siu rice

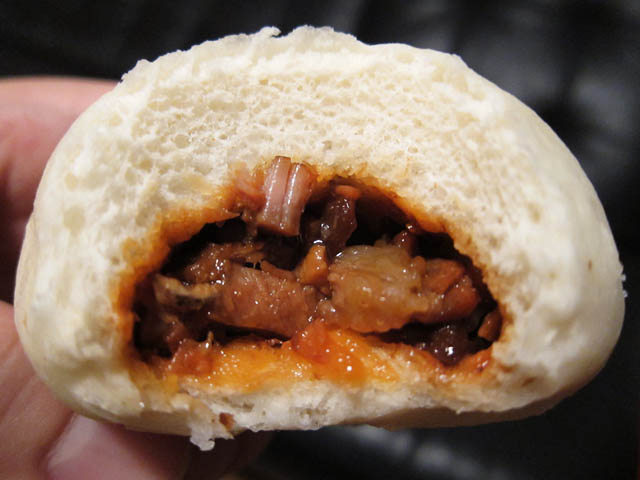
Char siu bao

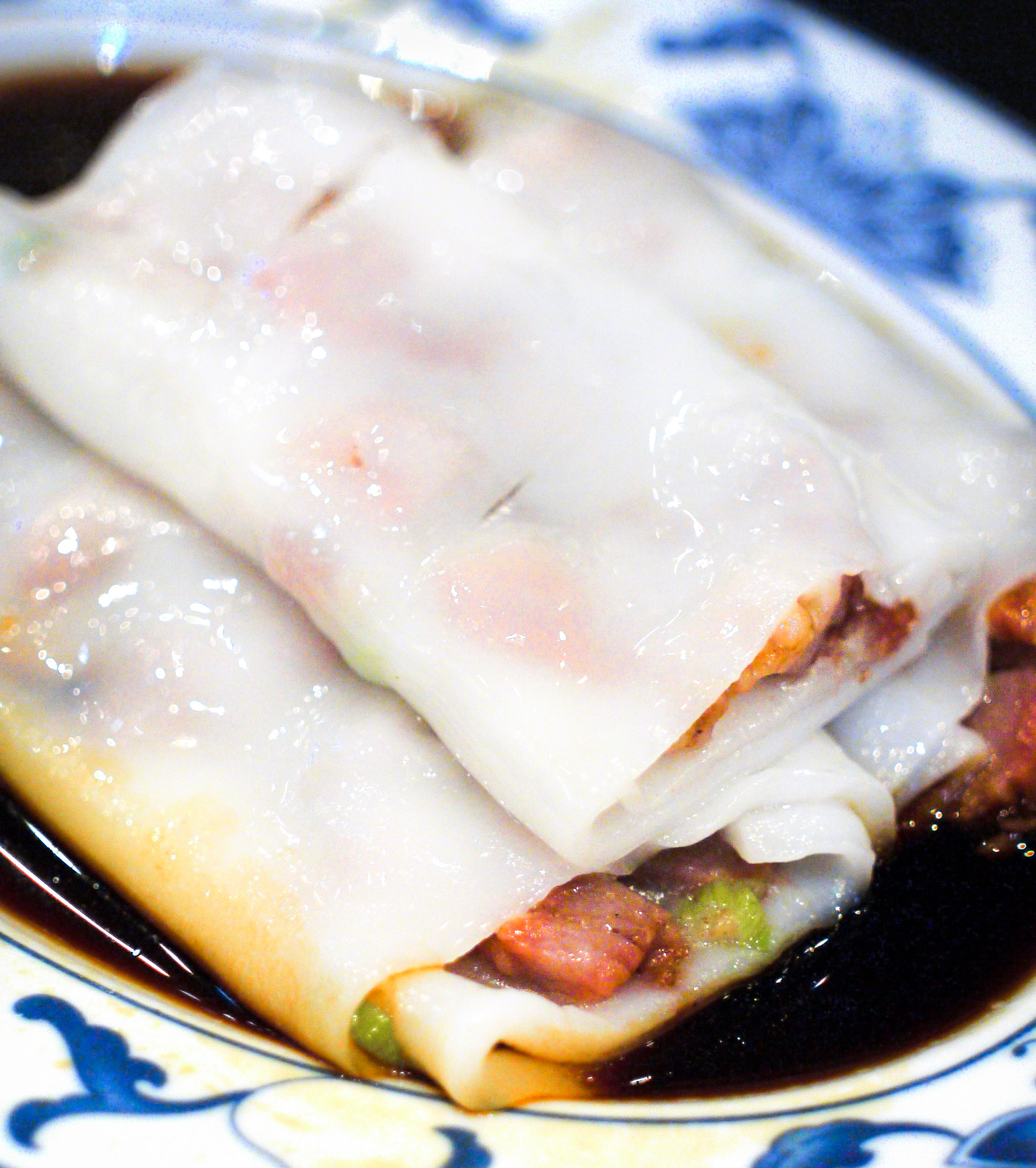
Char siu cheung fun (rice noodle rolls)

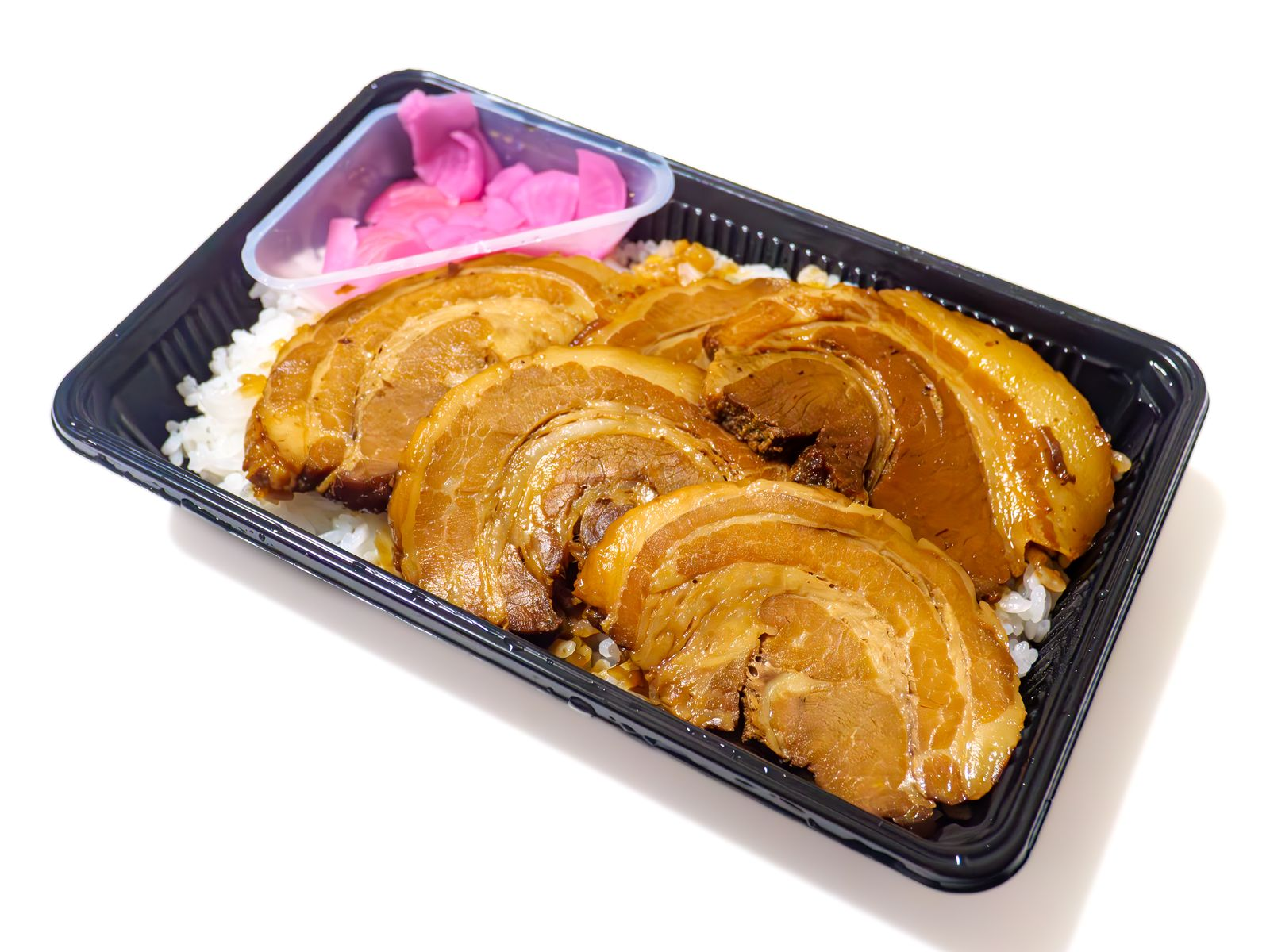
Japanese bento with chāshū

== See also ==
- Siu yuk - another variation of roast pork
- Siu mei - generic term for Cantonese roasted meat
- Lou mei - braised meat commonly sold in a siu mei shop
- List of pork dishes
