= Orange cuttlefish =

Cantonese cuttlefish dish

- Traditional Chinese: 鹵水墨魚
- Simplified Chinese: 卤水墨鱼
- Hanyu Pinyin: lúshuǐ mòyú
- Cantonese Yale: lóuh séui mahk yù
- Literal meaning: master-sauce stewed cuttlefish
Transcriptions
Standard Mandarin
- Hanyu Pinyin: lúshuǐ mòyú
Yue: Cantonese
- Yale Romanization: lóuh séui mahk yù
Southern Min
- Hokkien POJ: lóo-tsuí-ba̍k-hû

Orange cuttlefish or bittern cuttlefish is the most common English name used for the cuttlefish dish in Hong Kong daa laang (打冷) shop style Teochew cuisine.

Orange cuttlefish
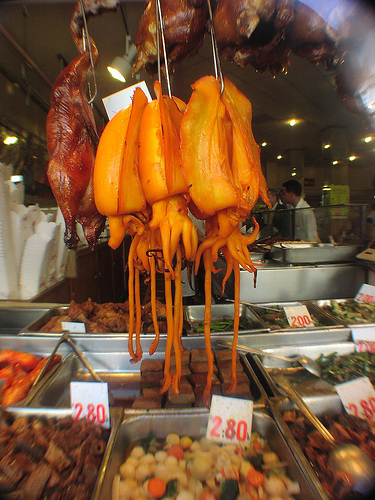
- Alternative names: Orange squid
- Place of origin: Guangdong or Chaozhou
- Main ingredients: cuttlefish

It is often confused with siu mei, but it is not siu mei, because it is not roasted. The dish is most commonly found in South-East Asia, Southern China, Hong Kong and overseas Chinatowns.

== Names ==
The original name of the dish is called bittern cuttlefish (滷水墨魚) and its colour is brownish white because of the sweetened soy sauce used. If left unconsumed for sometime, the colour of the bittern cuttlefish will grow dark and look less appealing. Therefore, when the dish is cooked in Hong Kong, the daa laang shop owners will add some food colouring, usually orange, when cooking the cuttlefish in brine.

Nowadays, in Hong Kong, the dish is also sold as a street food. When serving English speaking customers, the daa laang shops call the dish "orange cuttlefish" (橙色墨魚). However, some restaurants have started to serve uncoloured bittern cuttlefish because of health concerns.

== Cantonese cuisine ==
The orange color comes from food coloring dye. Some flavors are added in order to enhance the taste of the cuttlefish. It has a unique soft-crisp (Chinese: 爽; Cantonese Yale: sóng) texture, generally not found in any other meat.

When served, it is usually sliced into tiny pieces. It comes with a black soy sauce-based dipping gravy called (Chinese: 鹵水; Cantonese Yale: lóuh séui) that gives it a mildly salty flavor. The sauce is culturally accepted to originate in Guangdong or Chaozhou cuisine.

== See also ==
- Dried shredded squid
- List of seafood dishes
