= Siu mei =

Cantonese roasted meat

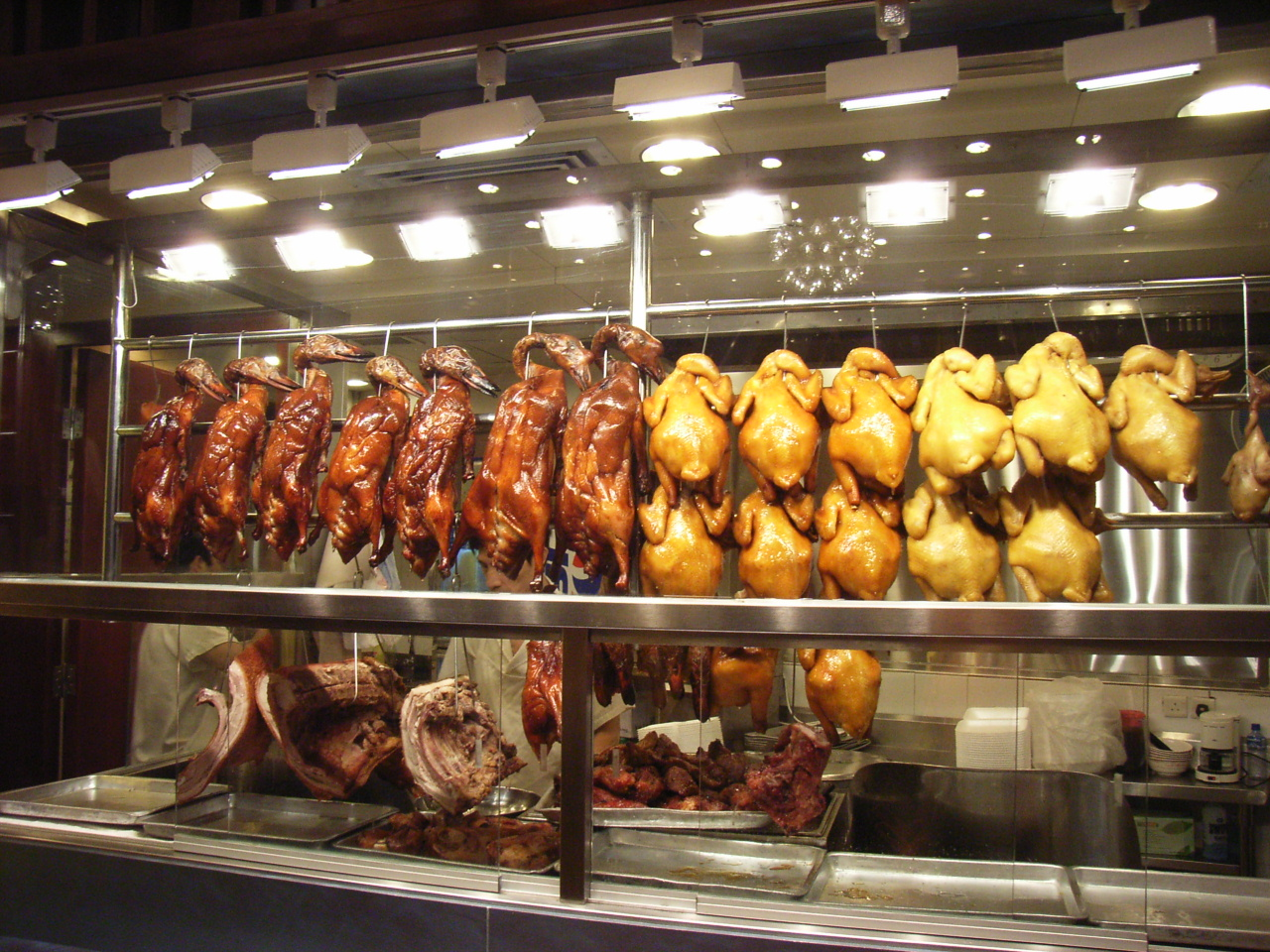
- Roasted duck (top left) soy sauce chicken (top middle) white cut chicken (top right) roasted pork (bottom left); Char siu (bottom right, on tray)
- Traditional Chinese: 燒味
- Simplified Chinese: 烧味
- Jyutping: siu1 mei2
- Hanyu Pinyin: shāowèi
- Literal meaning: roasted items
Transcriptions
Standard Mandarin
- Hanyu Pinyin: shāowèi
- IPA: [ʂáʊ wêɪ]
Yue: Cantonese
- Yale Romanization: sīuméi
- Jyutping: siu1 mei2
- IPA: [siw˥ mej˧˥]
Southern Min
- Hokkien POJ: sio-bī

Siu mei (Chinese: 燒味) is the generic Cantonese name of meats roasted on spits over an open fire or in a large wood-burning rotisserie oven. This technique creates a unique, deep barbecue flavor and the roast is usually coated with a flavorful sauce (a different sauce is used for each variety of meat) before roasting. Siu mei is very popular in Hong Kong, Macau, Singapore, Malaysia and overseas Chinatowns, especially with Cantonese emigrants. In Hong Kong, the average person eats siu mei once every four days, with char siu being the most popular, followed by siu yuk (roast pork or pork belly) second, and roast goose third. Some dishes, such as white cut chicken and soy sauce chicken, are not roasted at all but are considered siu mei nonetheless. Siu mei is also known colloquially as siu laap (燒臘), as the latter term encompasses siu mei and laap mei, a type of preserved meat. They are usually prepared in the same kitchen during autumn and winter season in what are often known as siu laap establishments or Chinese barbecue shops. Siu laap is also often sold alongside lou mei, such as orange cuttlefish and pig's ear.

== History ==
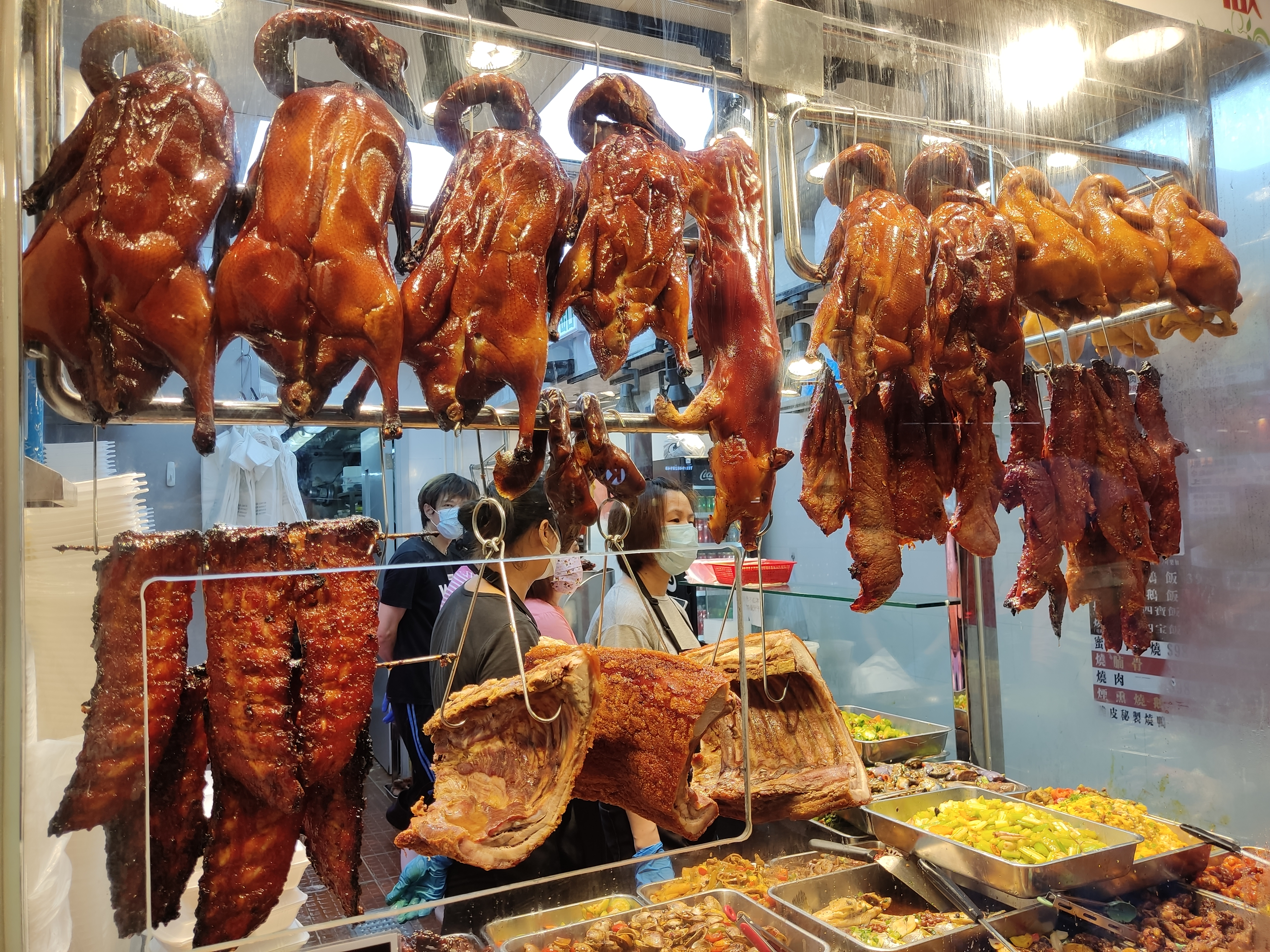
A siu laap shop in Hong Kong

The traditional practice of preparing Cantonese barbecued meats originated in ancient Chinese imperial cookbooks before being refined over generations within the Guangdong province. From the mid-19th to the early 20th century, the dish saw a massive global expansion driven heavily by southern Chinese immigration networks. After meetings held between the Food Hygiene Select Committee, the Markets and Abattoirs Select Committee and the Street Traders Select Committee on the topic of "Sale of Cooked Food, Siu Mei, and Lo Mei in Public Markets" in 1978, siu mei shops officially entered into Hong Kong public markets. The public market is a popular place for ordinary citizens to buy siu mei.

== Preparation ==
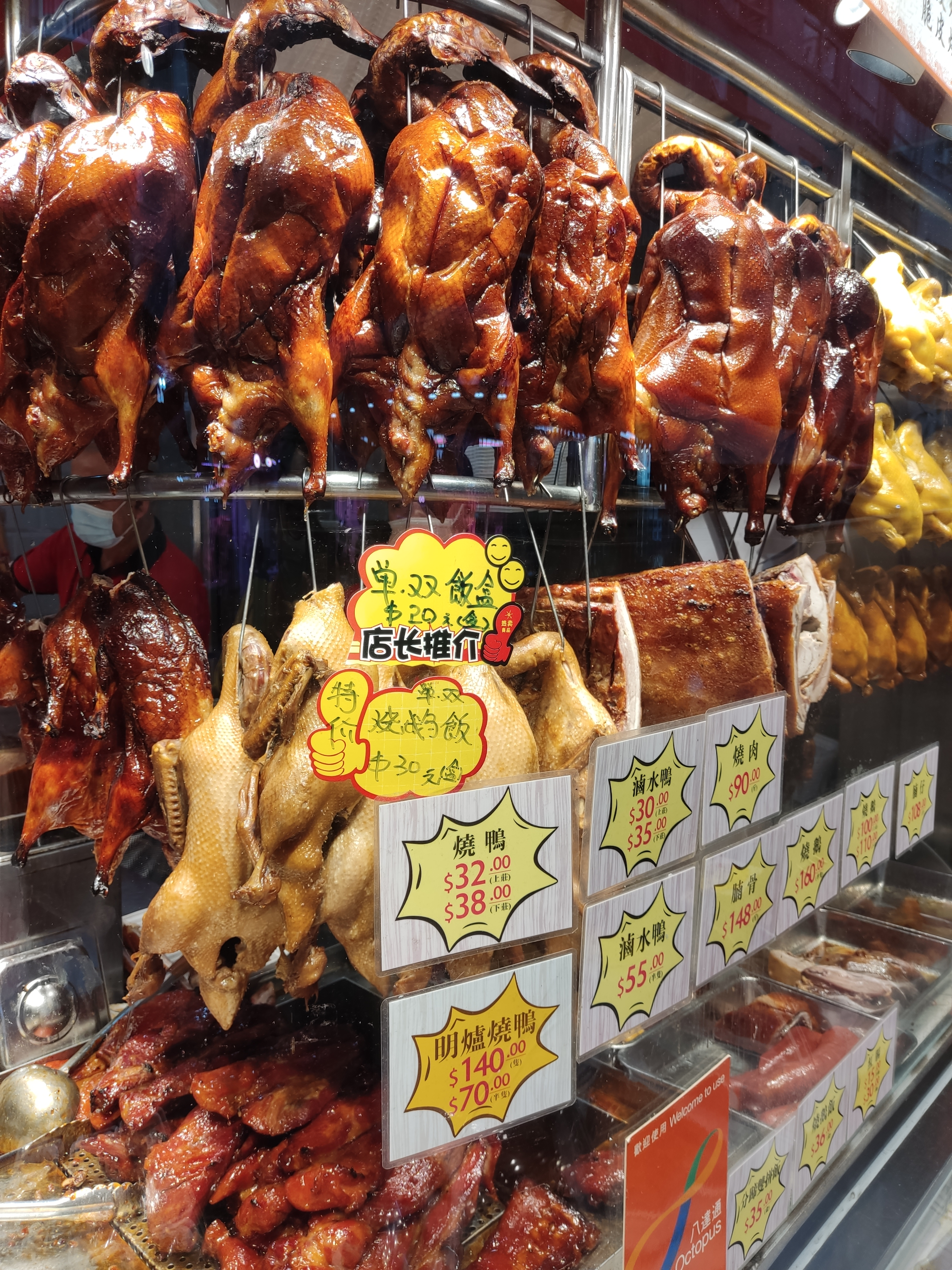
Roasted ducks

As siu mei takes a great deal of resources to prepare, requiring large ovens and rotisserie-like utilities for cooking the meat, few homes in Hong Kong, mainland China, or overseas have the equipment for it. Usually meat of this type is prepared and sold from siu laap shops located in hawker centres (in Hong Kong), food courts (overseas Chinese malls such as Pacific Mall), ethnic supermarkets (for example, the T&T Supermarket chain in Canada) and restaurants, which tend to mass-produce the numerous siu mei varieties rather than preparing it at each customer's request. The advantage of siu mei and lou mei is that the resulting meat retains its flavor and texture for the whole day, in contrast to Peking duck or crispy fried chicken, which have to be served immediately after preparation and cooking (hence these are eaten in restaurants), making siu mei and lou mei popular for party platters and take-out.

Take-out is quite common, as customers order or prepare their own plain white rice to accompany the siu mei; a siu mei meal comprises meat atop plain white rice or noodles, and often with vegetables (napa cabbage, choy sum, or gai lan), usually served in a plastic foam take-out container or on a plate.

In Chinese fine dining and banquet halls, the barbecue platter yu chu (roasted suckling pig) or siu yuk (roasted pig belly), often in combination with char siu, soy sauce chicken, siu aap (roasted duck) and jellyfish, is an appetizer that comprises the first dish in the ten-course Chinese banquet meal, while varieties of siu laap can also be ordered as full dishes à la carte (usually a half or whole chicken/duck/goose).

== Varieties of siu mei and lou mei ==
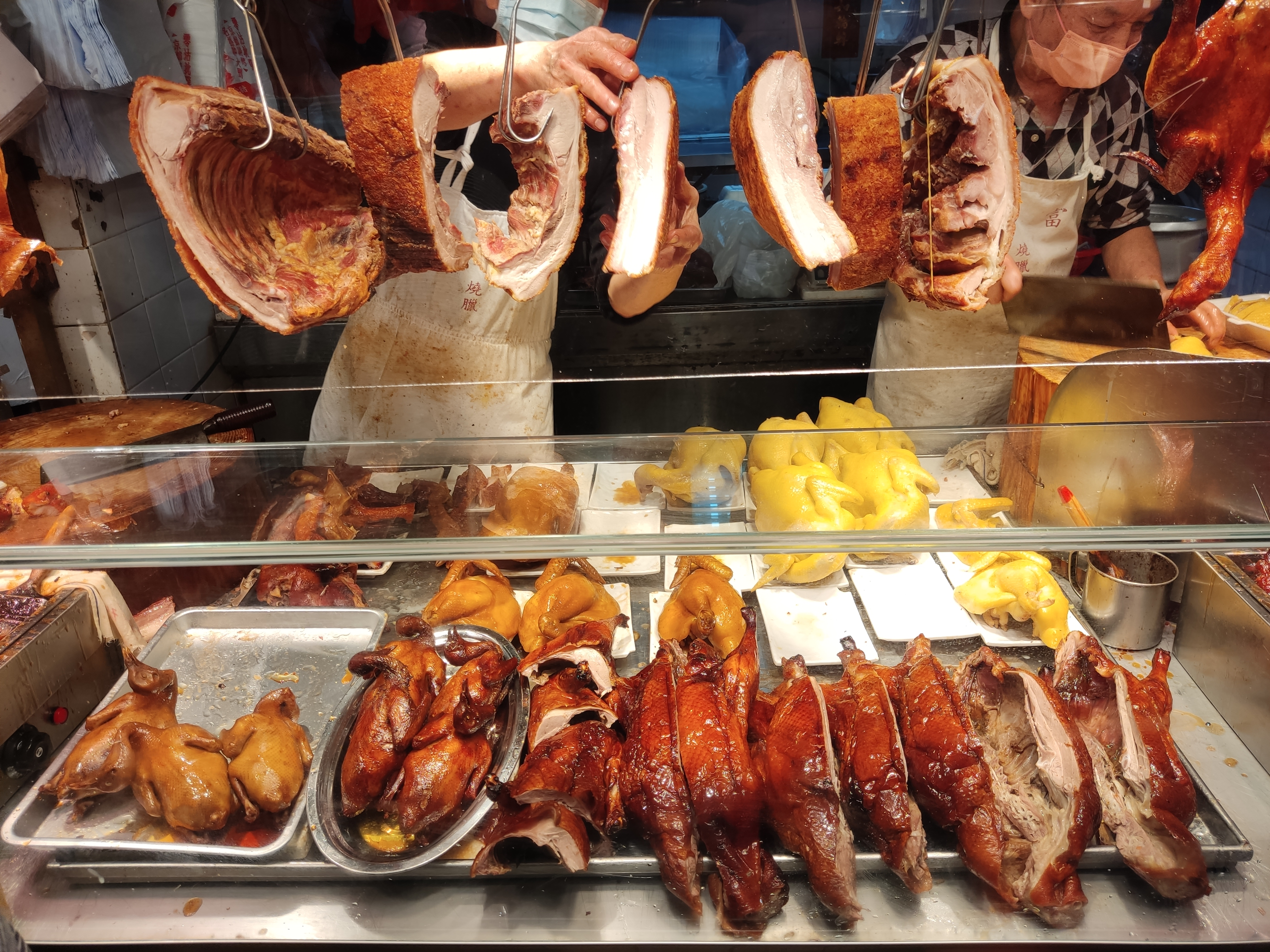
Roasted pork and chicken

- Char siu (叉燒) – barbecued pork
- Siu ngo (燒鵝) – roasted goose
- Siu aap (燒鴨) – roasted duck
- White cut chicken (白切雞) – marinated steamed chicken
- Soy sauce chicken (豉油雞) – chicken cooked with soy sauce
- Siu yuk (燒肉) – roasted pig, with crisp skin
- Yu chu (乳猪) – roasted suckling pig, with crisp skin
- Orange cuttlefish (鹵水墨魚) – marinated cuttlefish
- Lou sui aap yik (滷水鴨翼) – braised duck wings in master stock

== Gallery ==
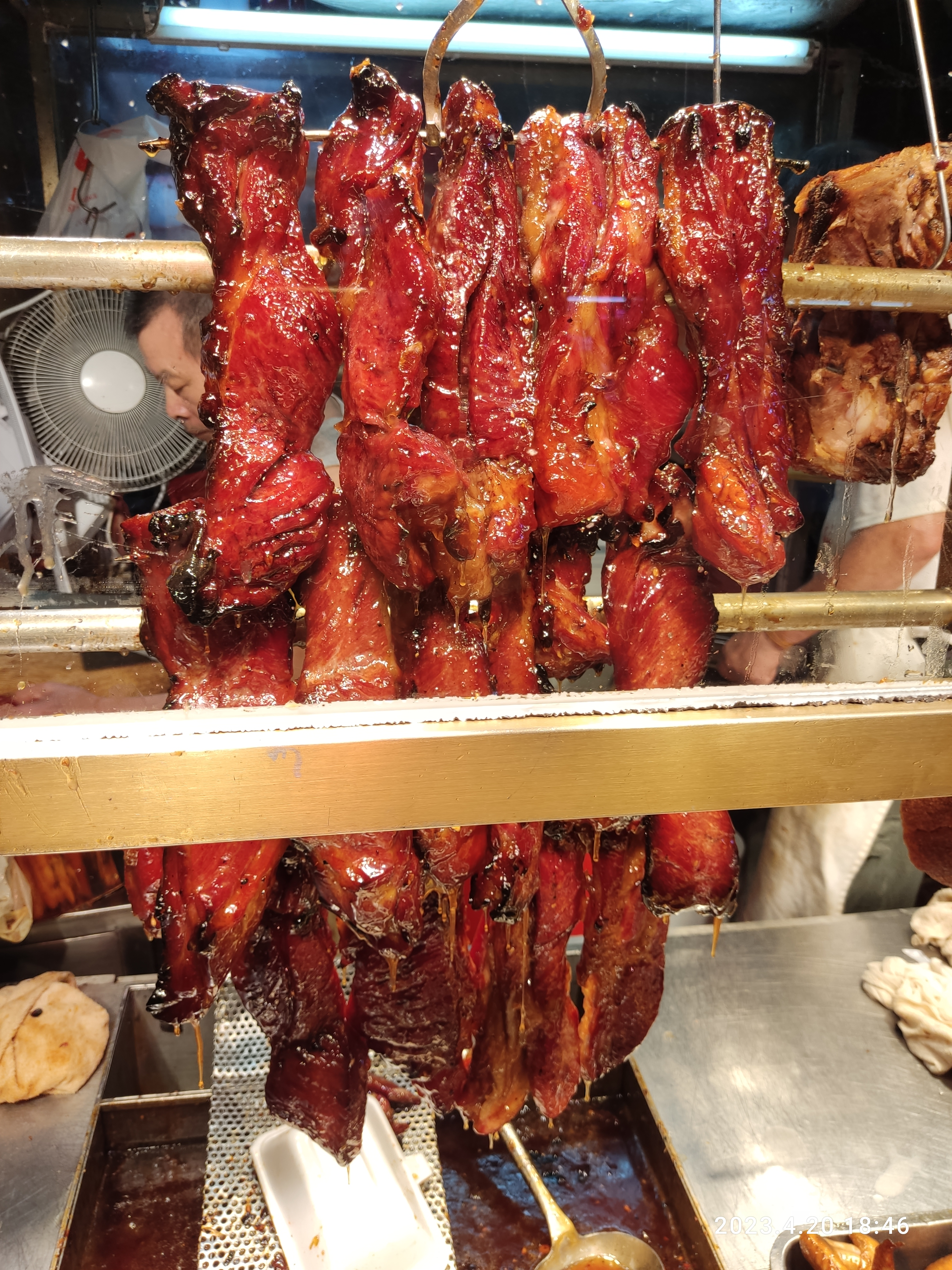

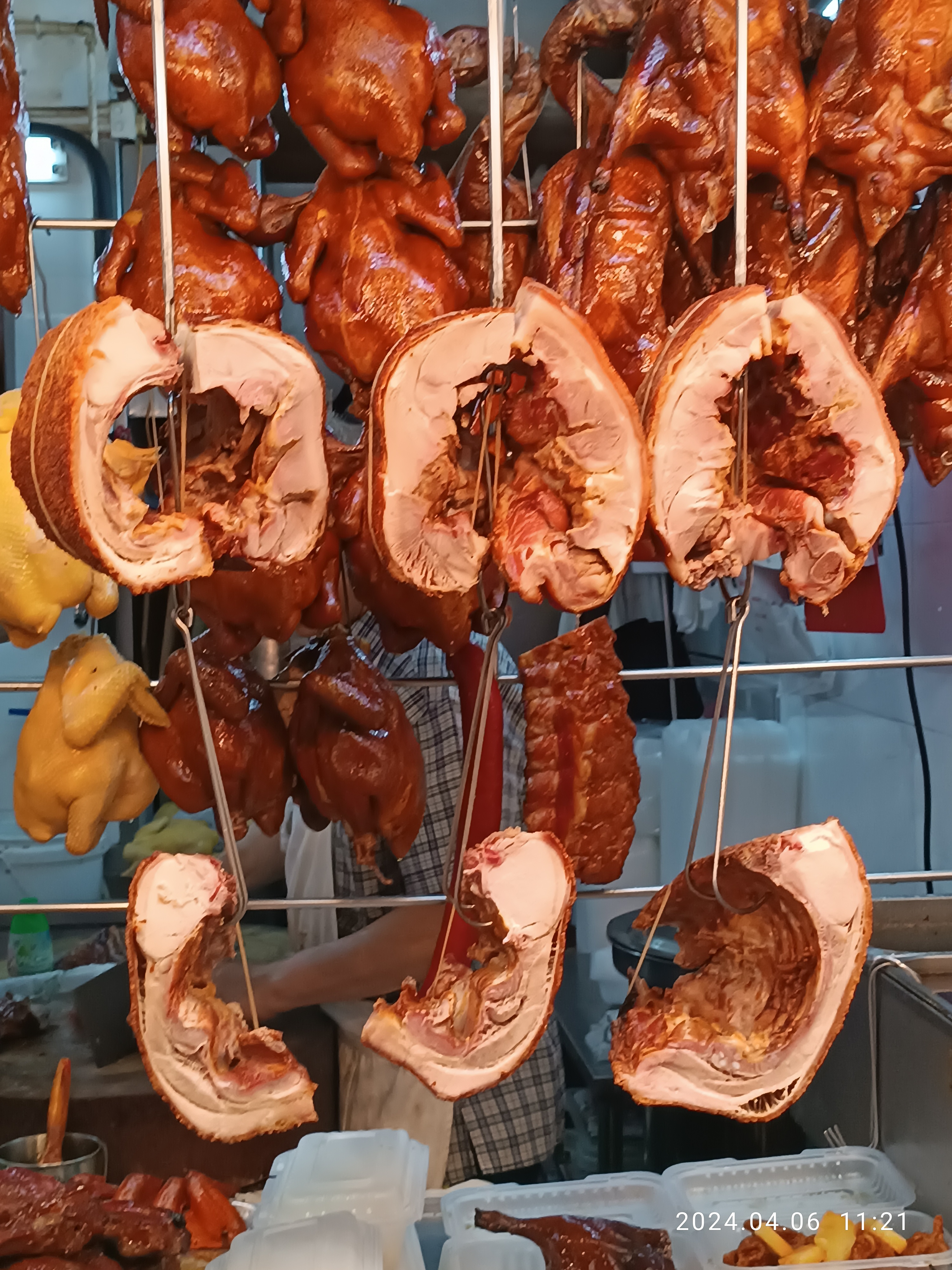

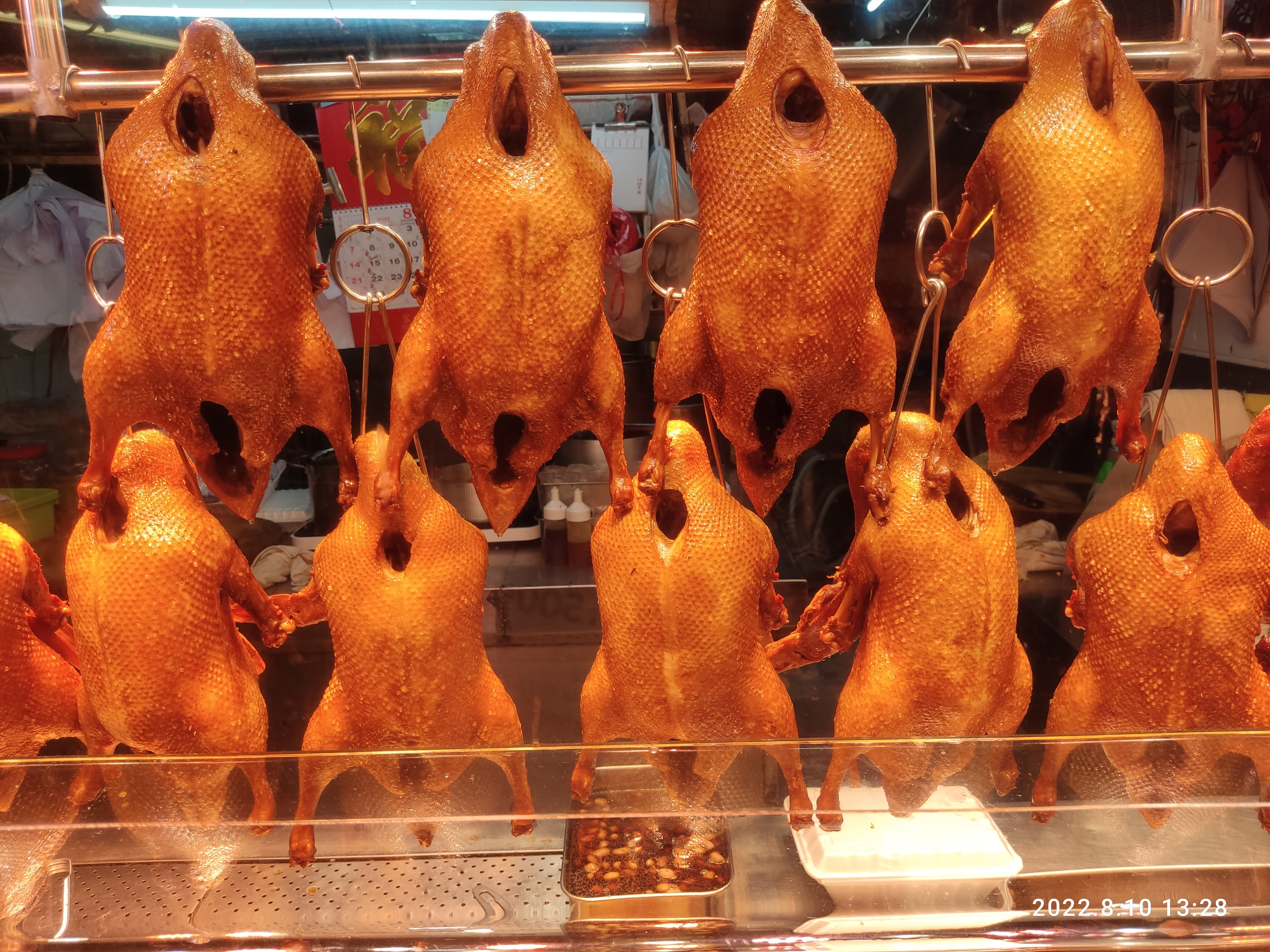

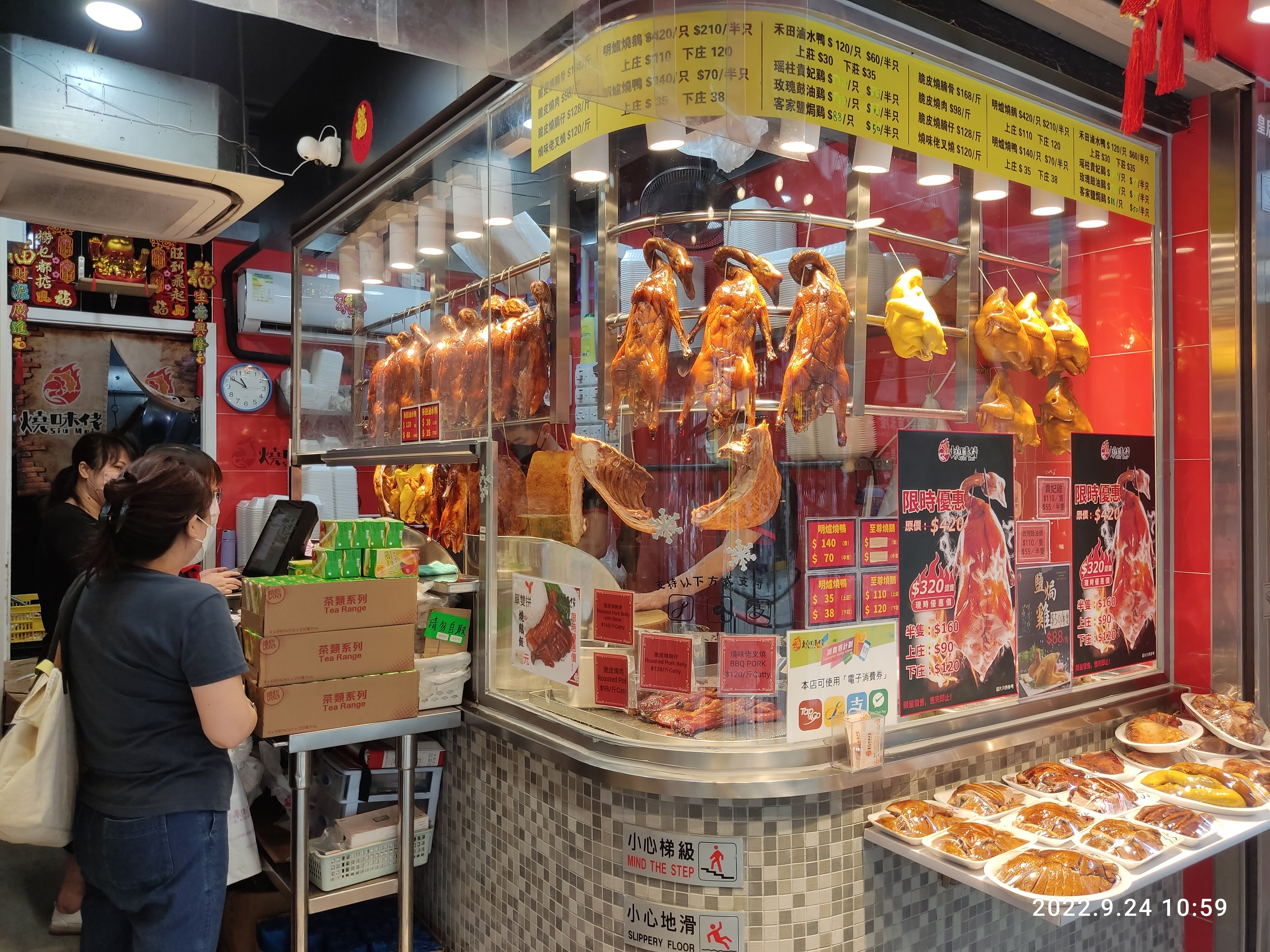

== See also ==
- Asado
- Barbecue
- Chuanr, northern Chinese barbecue
- List of spit-roasted foods
- Rotisserie
