= Soy sauce chicken =

Traditional Cantonese dish

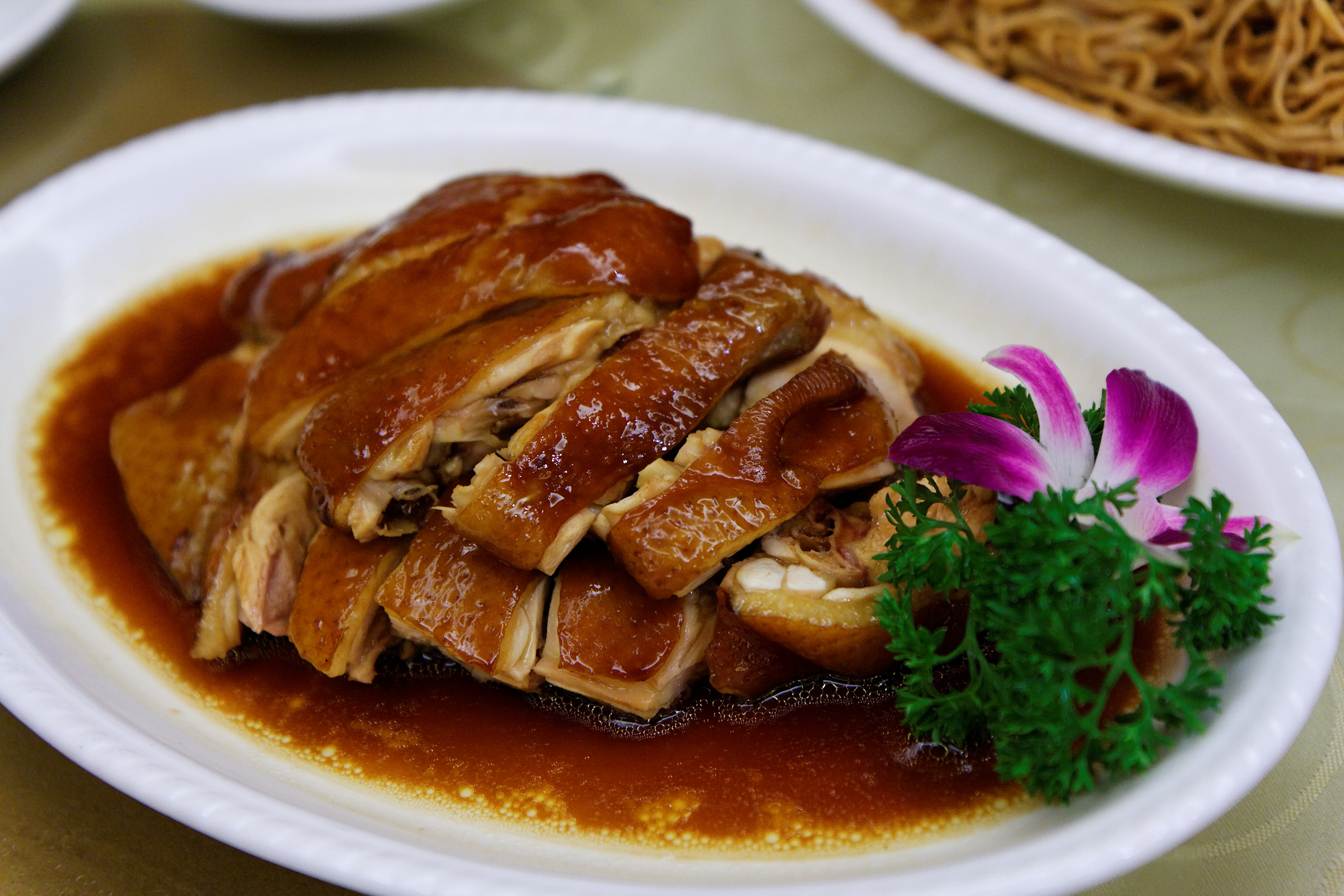
- Course: Main dish
- Place of origin: China
- Region or state: Guangdong
- Main ingredients: chicken, soy sauce

Soy sauce chicken
- Traditional Chinese: 豉油雞
- Simplified Chinese: 豉油鸡
- Hanyu Pinyin: chǐyóujī
- Cantonese Yale: si^{6} yau^{4} gai^{1}
- Literal meaning: soy sauce chicken
Transcriptions
Standard Mandarin
- Hanyu Pinyin: chǐyóujī
Hakka
- Romanization: si yiu gai
Yue: Cantonese
- Yale Romanization: si^{6} yau^{4} gai^{1}
- Jyutping: si^{6} jau^{4} gai^{1}

Alternative Chinese name
- Traditional Chinese: 醬油雞
- Simplified Chinese: 酱油鸡
Transcriptions

Soy sauce chicken is a traditional Cantonese cuisine dish made of chicken cooked with soy sauce. It is considered a siu mei dish in Hong Kong.

Another Cantonese dish, white cut chicken, often served with a salty ginger-onion paste, is more savoured for the taste of the meat, where the freshness of the chicken is noticeable.

Singapore's Hong Kong Soya Sauce Chicken Rice and Noodle, formerly the cheapest Michelin-starred restaurant in the world (having lost its star in 2021), specializes in this dish and offers it for the equivalent of US$2.

== Gallery ==
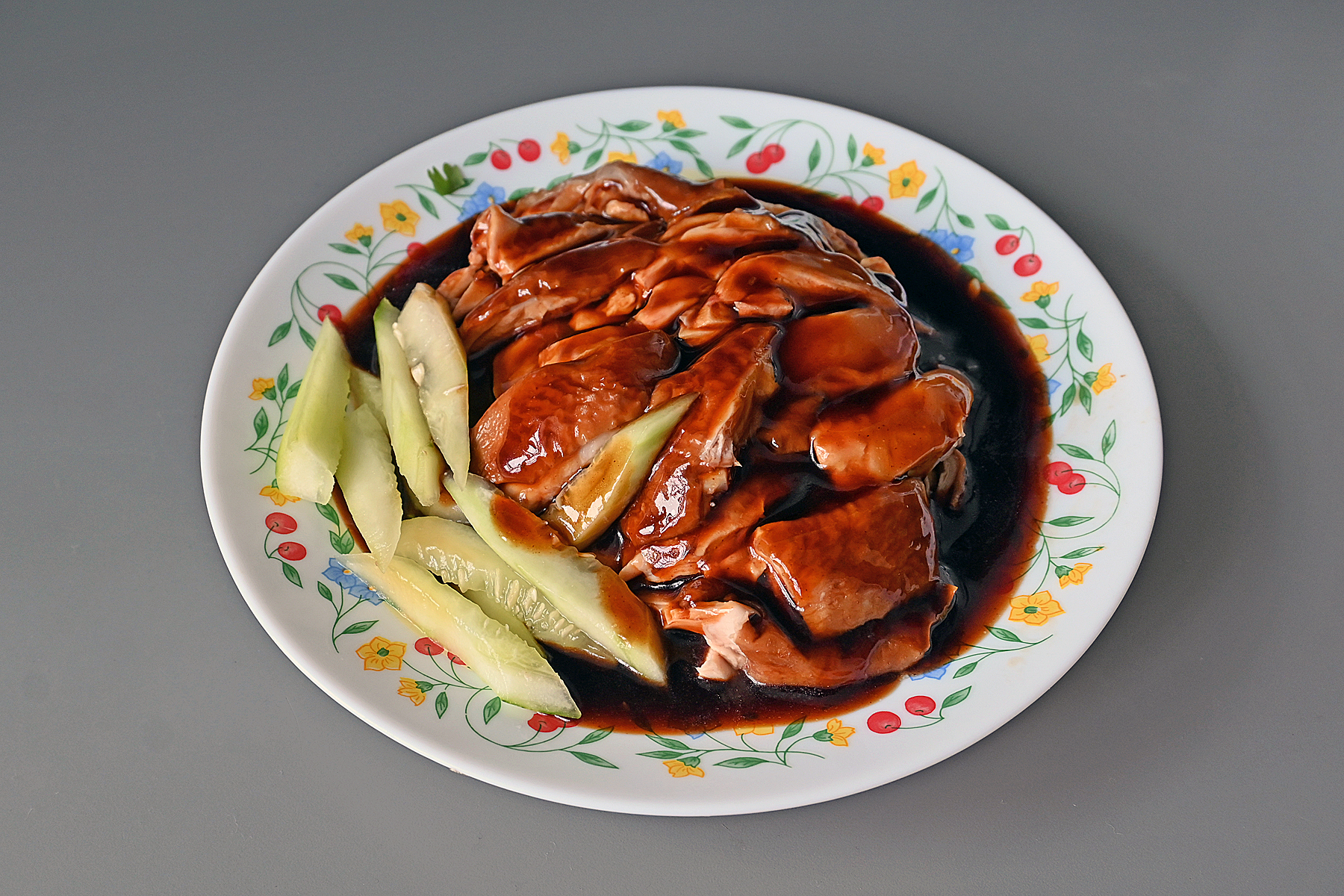

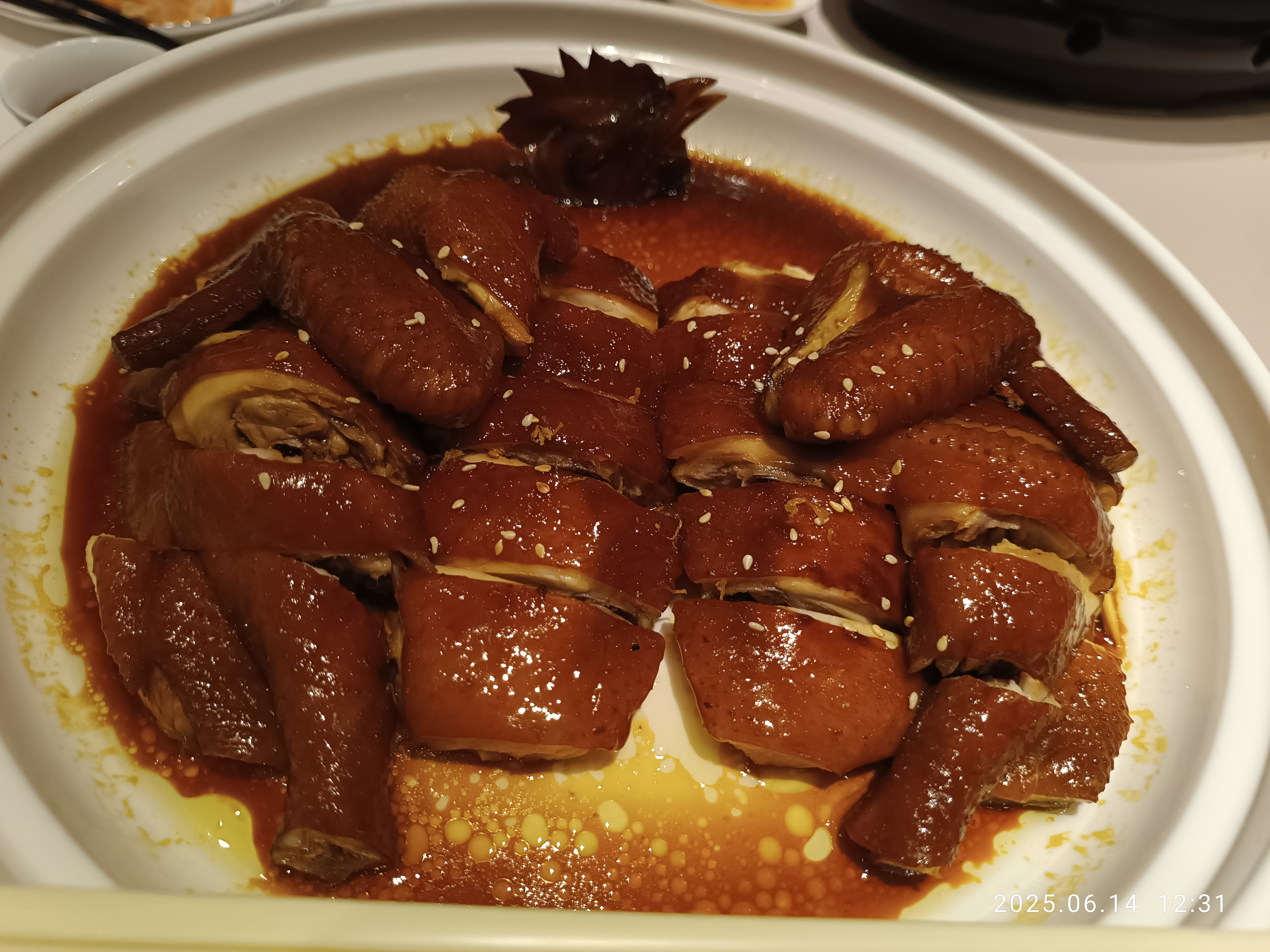

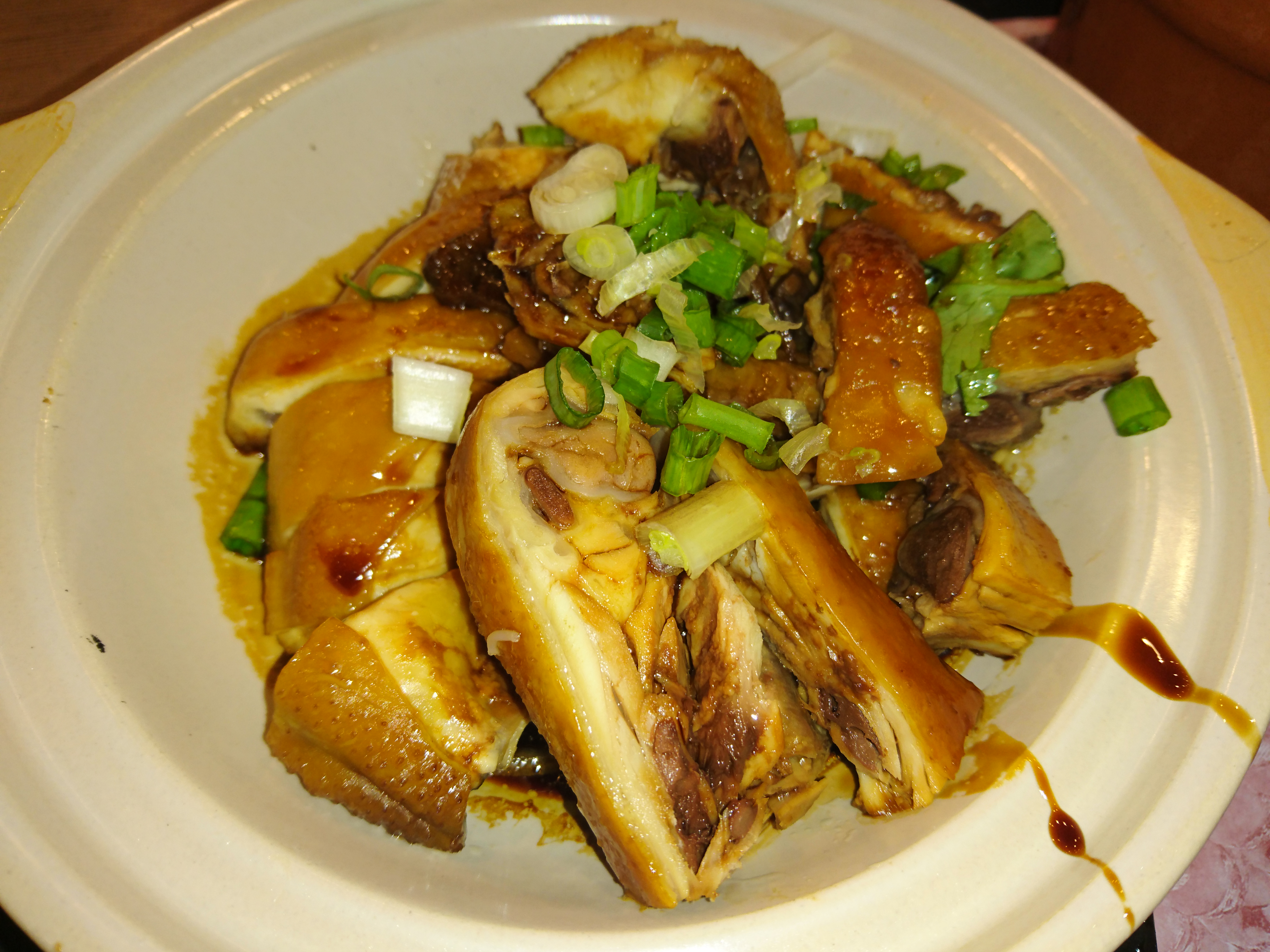

== See also ==
- Ayam kecap
- Crispy fried chicken
- Swiss wing
- Teriyaki
- List of chicken dishes
