= Roast goose =

Poultry dish

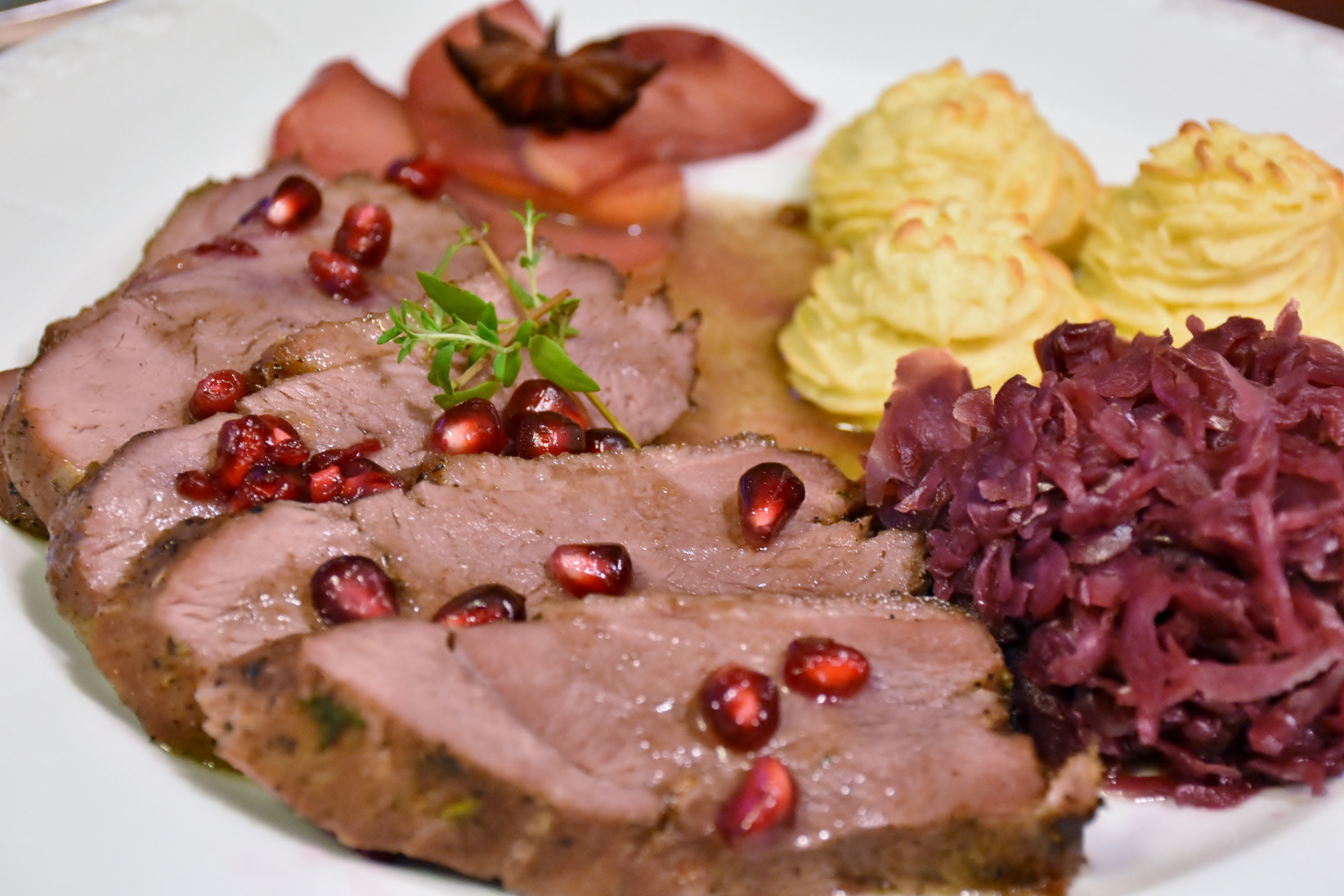
German roast goose

Roast goose is a dish of goose meat cooked using dry heat with hot air enveloping it evenly on all sides. Many varieties of roast goose appear in cuisines around the world, including Cantonese, European, and British cuisines. Roasting can enhance its flavor.

== Cantonese ==
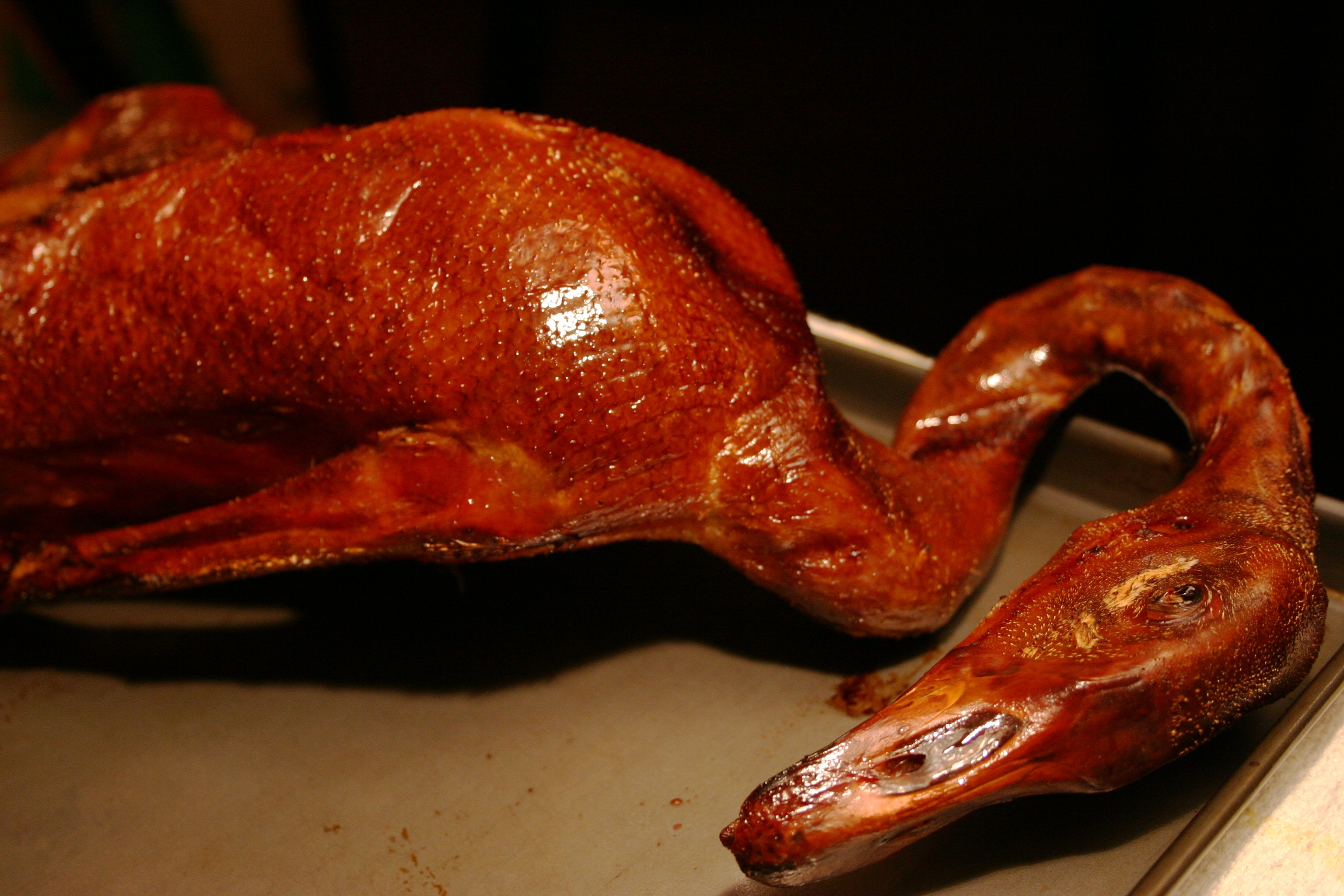
Cantonese roast goose

Roast goose
- Traditional Chinese: 燒鵝
- Simplified Chinese: 烧鹅
- Jyutping: siu1 ngo2
- Hanyu Pinyin: shāo é
- Literal meaning: roast goose
Transcriptions
Standard Mandarin
- Hanyu Pinyin: shāo é
- IPA: [ʂáʊ ɤ̌]
Yue: Cantonese
- Yale Romanization: sīu ngó
- Jyutping: siu1 ngo2
- IPA: [siw˥ ŋɔ˧˥]

In Guangdong and Hong Kong, roast goose is a variety of siu mei, or roasted meat dishes, within Cantonese cuisine. It is made by roasting geese with seasoning often in a charcoal furnace at high temperature. Roasted geese of high quality have crisp skin with juicy and tender meat. They are normally served with plum sauce to augment its flavour.

Results of a 2016 survey released by the municipal government of Guangzhou showed that roast goose was the most popular dish, outranking white cut chicken and roast squab.

== European ==
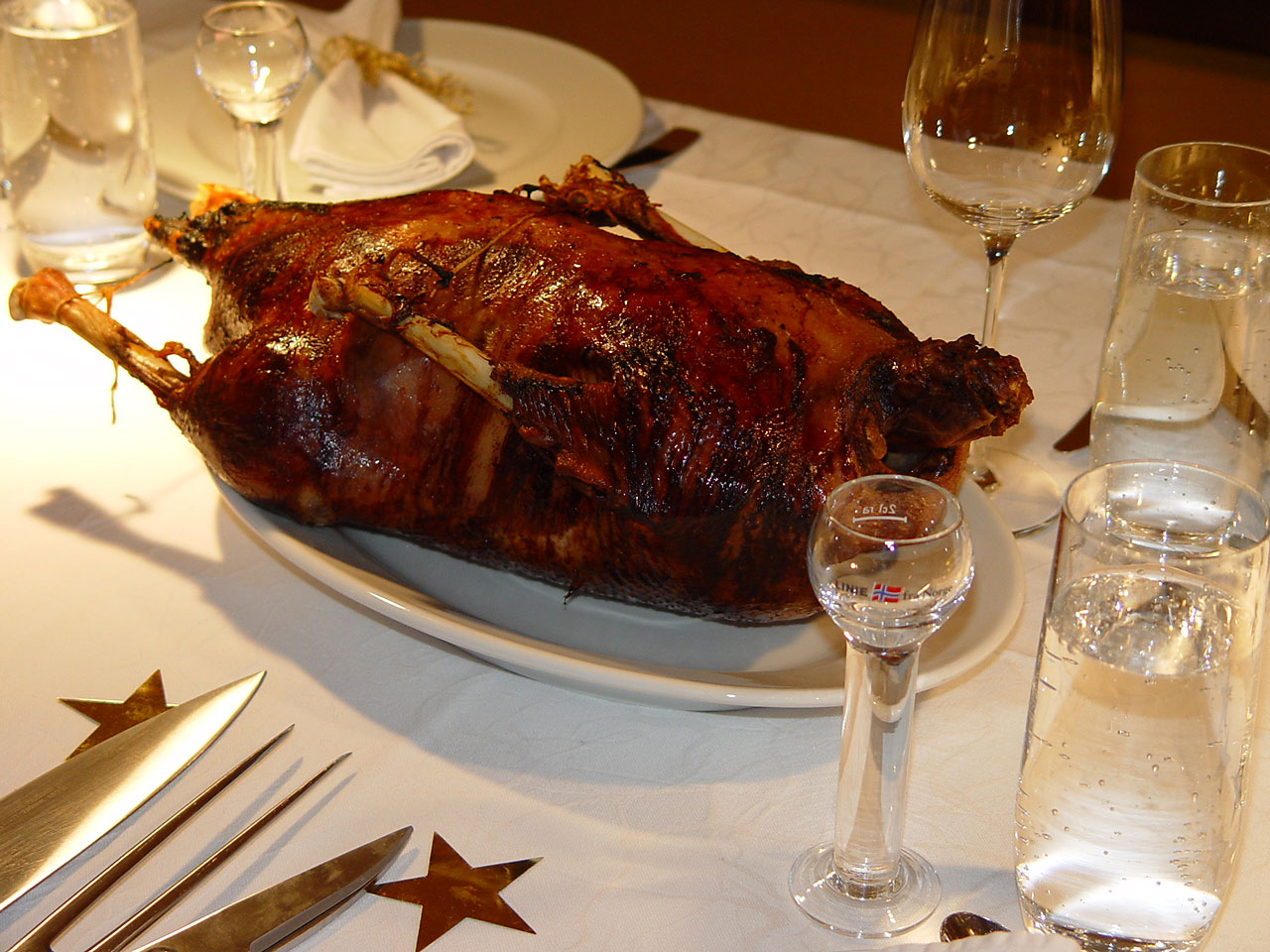
Christmas goose (Weihnachtsgans)

Goose has a distinct flavor which makes it a favorite European Christmas dish. In Germany, roast goose is a staple for Christmas Day meals. For European cultures, roast goose is traditionally eaten only on appointed holidays, including St. Martin's Day.

It is generally replaced by the turkey in the United States. Similarly, goose is often an alternative to turkey on European Christmas tables.

In the United States, the price per pound of goose is usually similar to that of farmed duck, but the large size of the bird and low yield of meat to bone and fat makes a goose a luxury item for most. An added value is that roasting a goose will render a great deal of excellent quality fat which is typically used for roasting potatoes or as the shortening in pie crust (sweet or savory). One can also simmer pieces of goose submerged in the fat to make confit.

Roast goose is also a popular ingredient for post-Christmas meals. There are a number of recipes for Boxing Day which make use of left over roast goose from one's Christmas Day banquet.

=== Variations ===
Prevalent stuffings are apples, sweet chestnuts, prunes and onions. Typical seasonings include salt and pepper, mugwort, or marjoram. Also used are red cabbage, Klöße, and gravy, which are used to garnish the goose.

=== Turkish ===
Kars style roast goose is one of the most famous food products special to Kars region of Turkey.

== Gallery ==
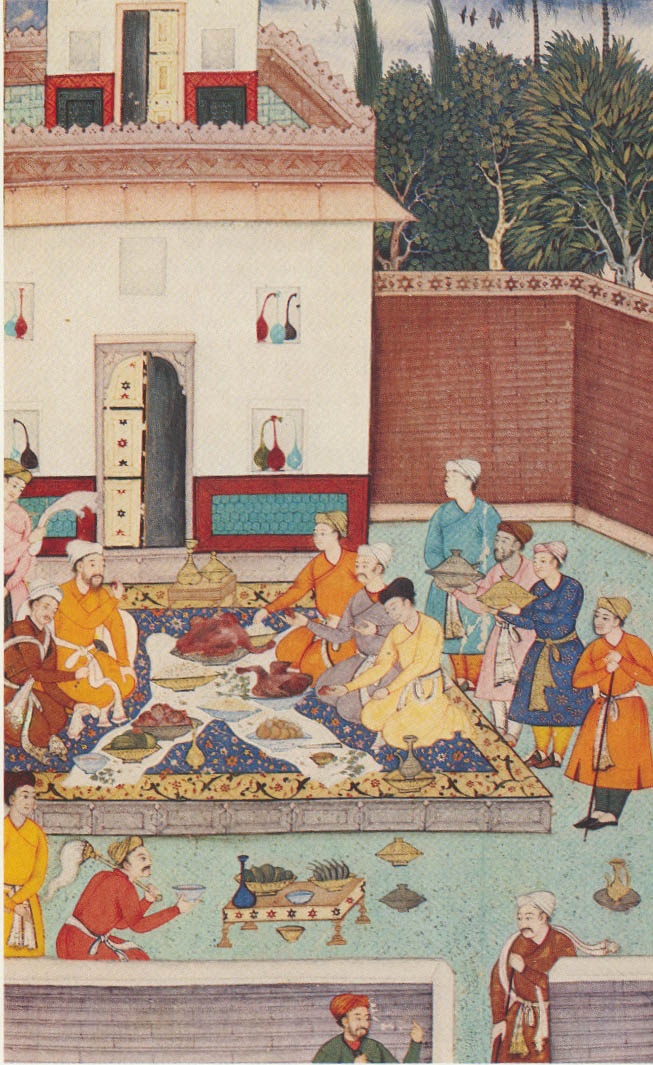
Timurid conqueror Babur in a banquet presented with roast goose

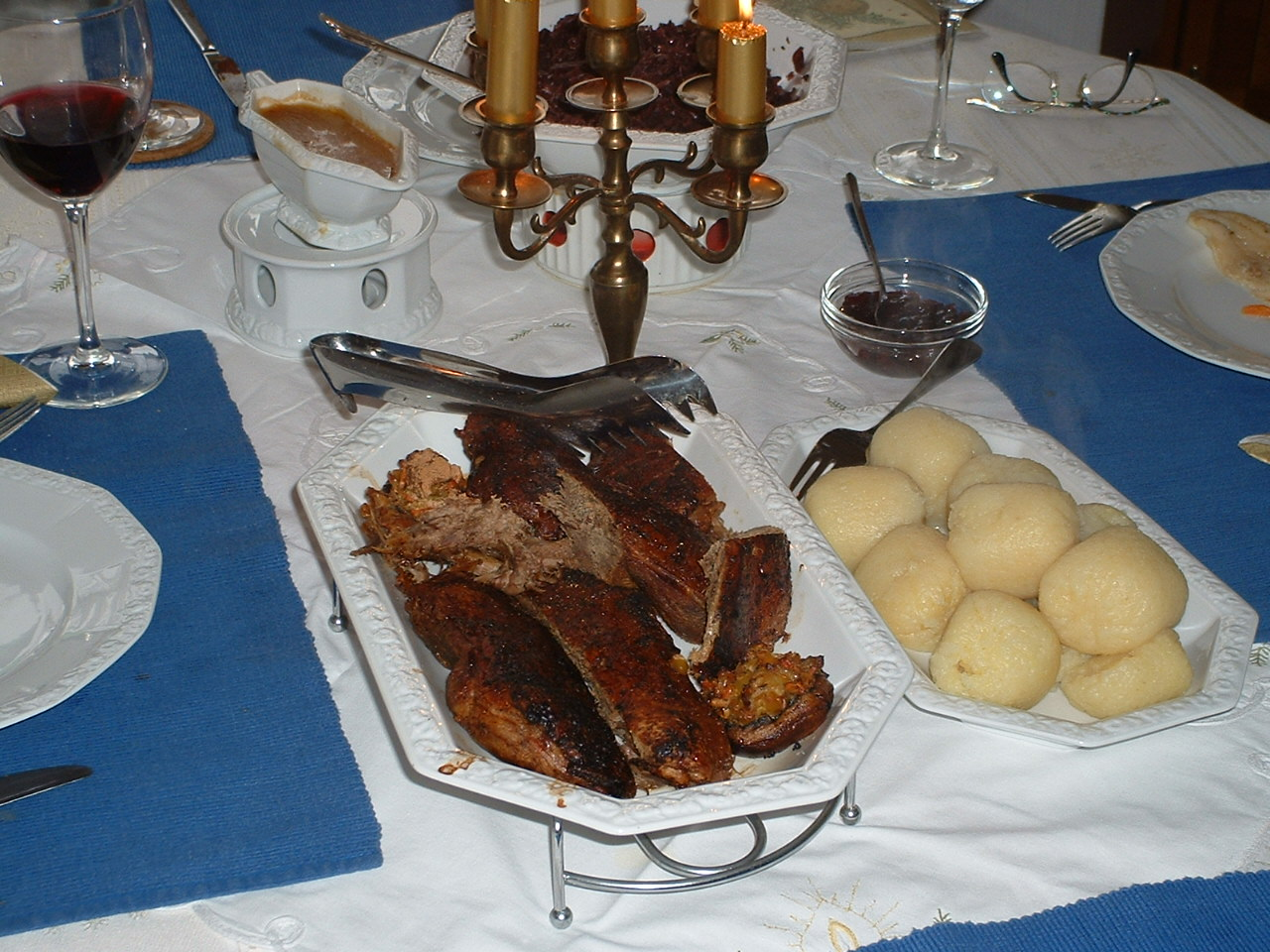
Roast goose with dumplings (Klöße) and red cabbage

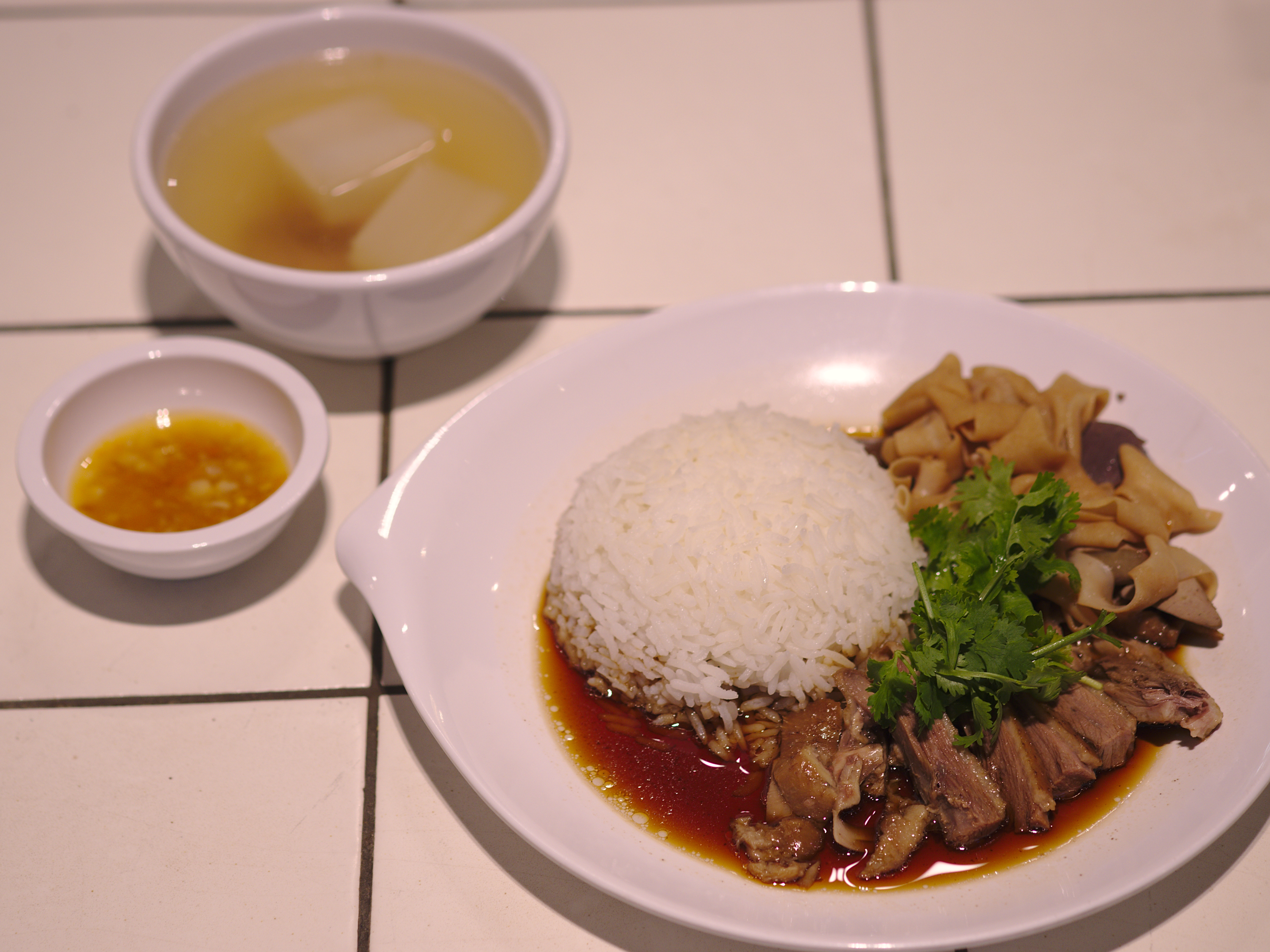
Roast goose curry served with rice at a restaurant in Thailand

== See also ==
- Siu mei
- Roast duck
- Roast chicken
- List of Christmas dishes
