= Daa laang =

Hong Kong meal

Daa laang (Chinese: 打冷; Jyutping: daa2 laang1; Cantonese Yale: dálāang) refers to a night-time meal in Hong Kong cuisine. First emerging in the 1950s, daa laang includes hot and cold Chiuchow dishes.

== Origins ==
Daa laang originated in Chiuchow (Modern Chinese spelling: Chaozhou) and is therefore also called Chiuchow daa laang (潮州打冷). Brought by Teochew immigrants in the 1950s, daa laang became a defining feature of Hong Kong’s night‑food culture during the 1960s.

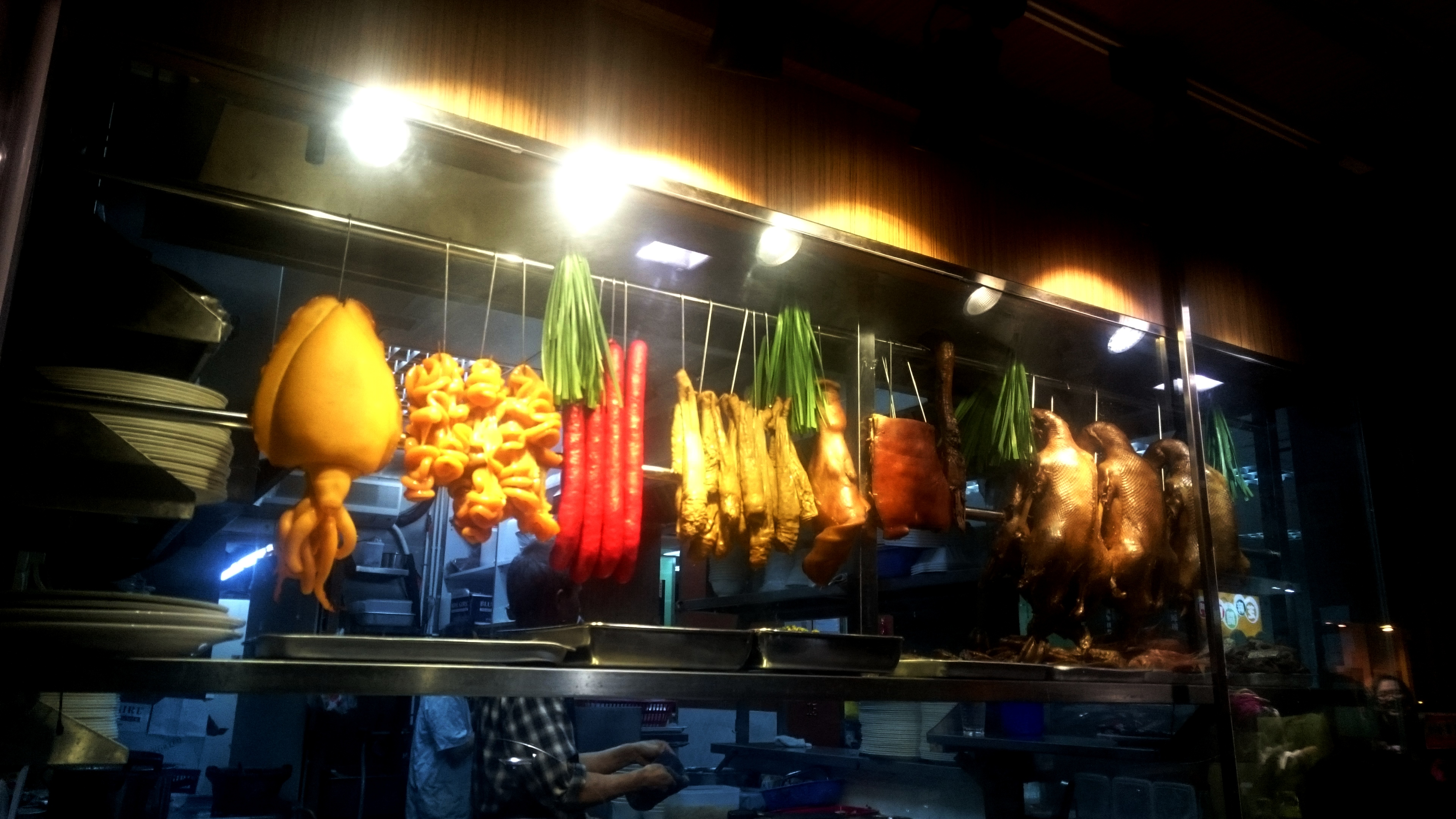
A counter displaying marinated food

The traditional way to order daa laang is to choose the dish of one's choice in front of a server, who then marks it down for the customers. The daa laang is then made and sent to the table. The trend of ordering such late-night meals is expanding outside of Hong Kong and into mainland China, particularly the city of Shenzhen.

== Etymology ==
The term is Cantonese and originated in Hong Kong. There are several proposed etymologies:

1. In the fiction of the Song and Yuan dynasties, terms such as da chim (Chinese: 打尖; Jyutping: daa2 zim1; Cantonese Yale: dá jìm) and da dim (Chinese: 打店; Jyutping: daa2 dim3; Cantonese Yale: dá dim) refer to going to a restaurant for dinner while traveling. Hence, the word daa (打; lit. 'hit') can refer to eating at a restaurant. In the Chiuchow dialect, the word lang means 'people'. Thus, Cantonese refer to the Chiuchow people as lang lo (Chinese: 冷佬; Jyutping: laang5 lou2; Cantonese Yale: làang lóu). Over time, lang lo became a slang term, referring to Chiuchow food stalls. Then gradually, the term daa laang referenced dinner at Hong Kong’s Chiuchow stalls.
2. In the 1950s, the sellers carried baskets with poles on their shoulders. They were called basket carriers (擔籃; dān lán). The pronunciation of this term in the Chiuchow dialect is similar to daa laang (打冷), so Hongkongers began to call them the daa laangs. The term basket carriers became daa laang (打冷) because the basket carriers would shout the foods they were selling to the buyers. The pier workers in Triangular Pier would shout back "basket carriers". The majority of Hongkongers could not understand it and mistaken the expression basket carriers as daa laang.
3. During that period, many gangs dined and dashed at Hong Kong's Chiuchow stalls. A Chiuchow gang formed in response to watch for the rival gangs. Once they found someone who came for a meal, they would yell "hit them!" to alert others. As daa laang in the Chiuchow dialect sounds like "hit them", people gradually associated daa laang with Chiuchow people. But this may not be true. In Teochew dialect, “hit them” is pronounced as pah4 nang7 and “hit them with fist” is dêng3 nang7. Both pronunciations are not similar to “hit them” in Cantonese. However, the term "Daa laang" as it was originally translated to mean “hitting someone” or “beating someone up” is actually wrong. The mistake was made because the translator who was likely a Cantonese speaker didn’t know the Teochew language well. In Teochew, to “hit” or to "beat" is "pah" (啪). Teochew people never use the Cantonese term of “hit” (daa, 打) to mean “beating someone up”. As most Cantonese speaking people do not know Teochew language well so the wrong translation out of misunderstanding became a set term in Hong Kong.

== Dishes ==
Dishes include a variety of cold cuts and spicy dishes originating from the food stalls in Chiu Chow. Marinated food, seafood, pickled products, and cooked dishes are the four main types of daa laang.

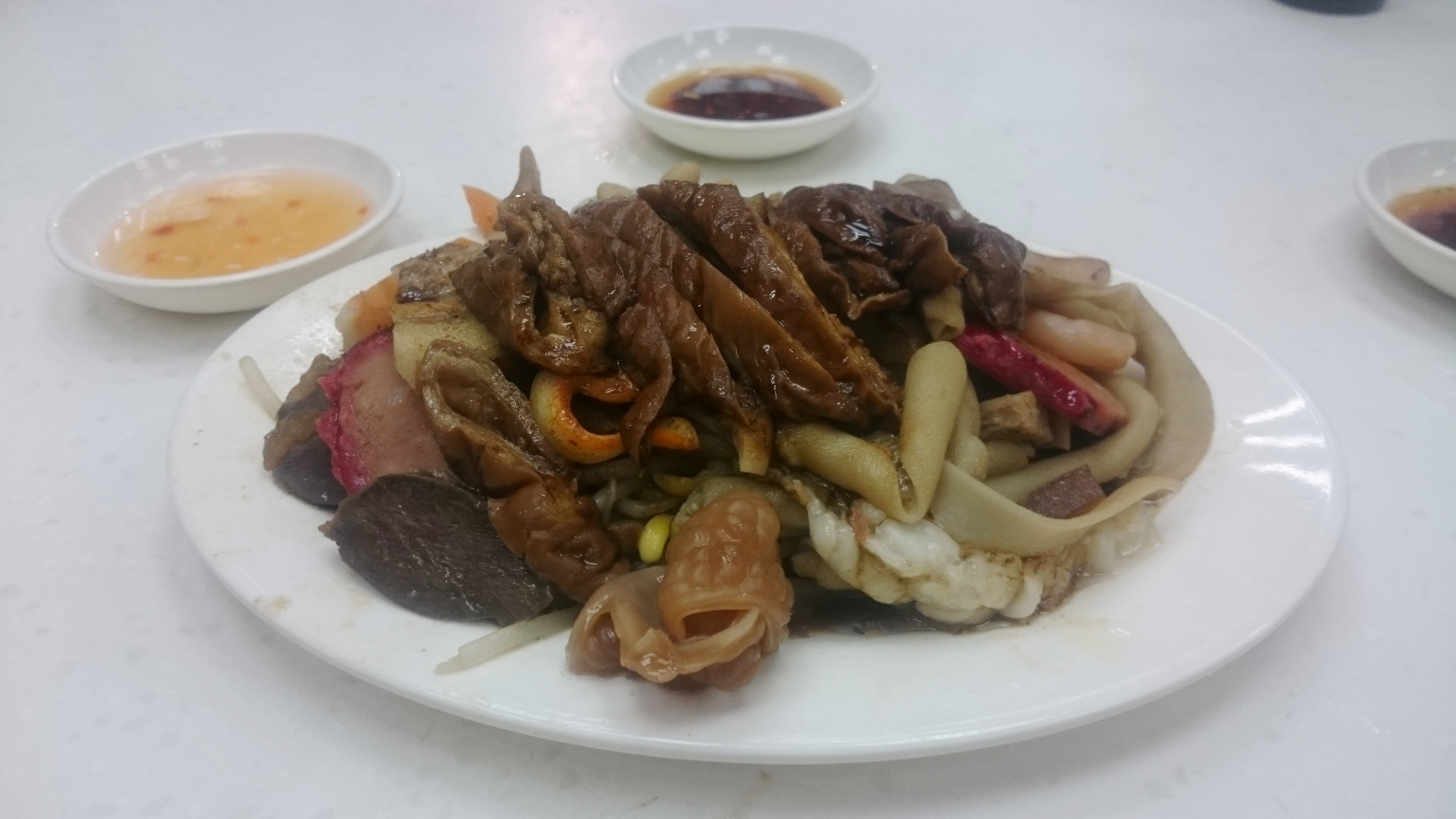
Different foods, like cuttlefish, bean curd, and goose pieces are cooked with a marinate sauce

One dish is the marinated or Chiu Chow soy-sauce goose.

A common style of fried food is referred to as "salt and pepper" style. This type of food is served with chili, and prepared by deep frying the food first (usually a light food like tofu or squid) and then stir-frying it with pepper and salt.

Popular cold items include iced cockle, made by first boiling and then freezing and served with a sauce made with garlic, sugar, and vinegar, and iced crab, which is first boiled and later frozen.
