= White cut chicken =

Chinese cuisine dish

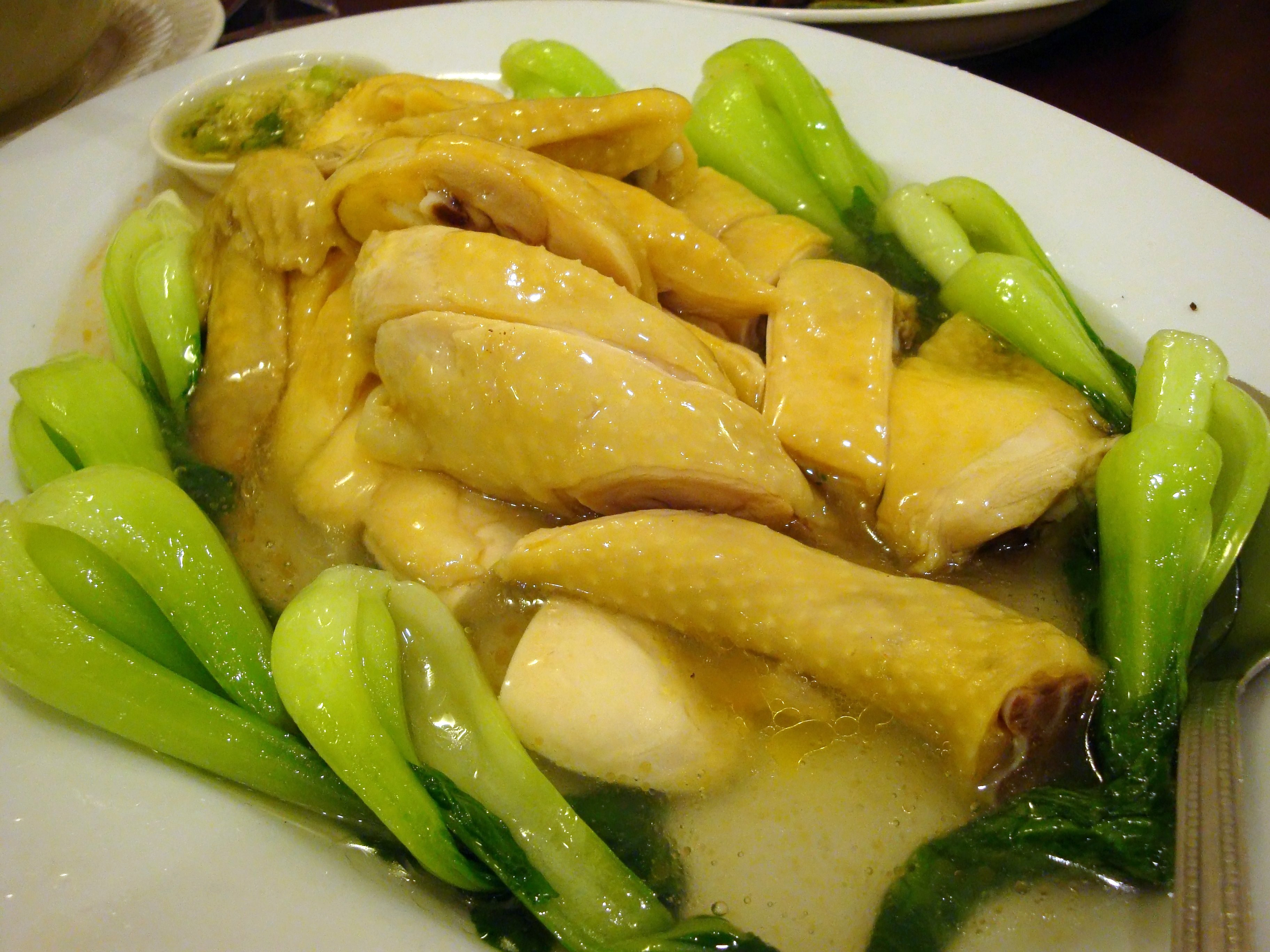
- White cut chicken with Shanghai bok choy and broth (usually served with geung yung, a tangy dip made of ginger, scallions, and garlic)
- Course: Main dishes
- Place of origin: China
- Region or state: Hong Kong, Guangdong, Fujian
- Main ingredients: Chicken, ginger, scallion, cilantro

White cut chicken
- Traditional Chinese: 白切雞
- Simplified Chinese: 白切鸡
- Jyutping: baak6 cit3 gai1
- Hanyu Pinyin: báiqiējī
- Literal meaning: white cut chicken
Transcriptions
Standard Mandarin
- Hanyu Pinyin: báiqiējī
- Bopomofo: ㄅㄞˊ ㄑㄧㄝ ㄐㄧ
- Wade–Giles: pai^{2}-ch‘ieh^{1}-chi^{1}
- IPA: [pǎɪ.tɕʰjé.tɕí]
Hakka
- Romanization: pak cet gai
Yue: Cantonese
- Yale Romanization: baahkchitgāi
- Jyutping: baak6 cit3 gai1
- IPA: [pak̚˨.tsʰit̚˧.kɐj˥]
Southern Min
- Hokkien POJ: pe̍h-tshiat-ke

White cut chicken or white sliced chicken (traditional Chinese: 白切雞; simplified Chinese: 白切鸡) is a type of siu mei. Unlike most other meats in the siu mei category, this particular dish is not roasted, but poached. The dish is common to the cultures of Southern China, including Guangdong, Fujian and Hong Kong. In Hawaii, this well-known dish is called cold ginger chicken.

== Preparation ==
The chicken is salt-marinated and cooked whole in either plain hot water or chicken broth with ginger. Other variations season the cooking liquid with additional ingredients, such as the white part of the green onion, cilantro stems or star anise. When the water starts to boil, the heat is turned off, allowing the chicken to cook in the residual heat for around 30 minutes. The chicken's skin will remain nearly white in color, and the meat will be tender and juicy. The dish can be served "rare", in which the meat is cooked thoroughly but a pinkish dark red blood is secreted from the bones. This is a more traditional version of white cut chicken that is seldom served in Chinese restaurants anymore. The chicken is usually cooled before cutting into pieces.

The chicken is served in pieces, with the skin and bone, sometimes garnished with cilantro, leeks or a slice of ginger. It is usually accompanied by a condiment called geung yung (Chinese: 薑蓉; pinyin: jīang róng; Cantonese Yale: gēung yùng; lit. 'ginger paste') made by combining finely minced ginger, finely minced garlic, green onion, salt and hot oil. In Hawaii, this sauce is widely used in other dishes such as poke and noodles. Additional dips can be spicy mustard, hoisin sauce, soy sauce, oyster sauce or chili pepper sauce.

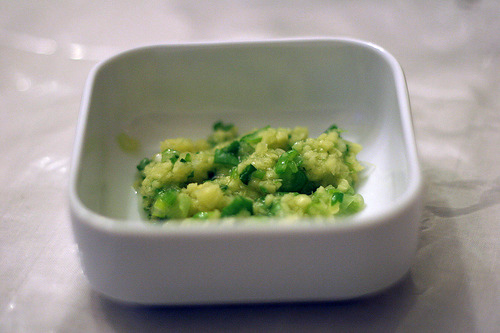
Geung yung, a condiment made of minced ginger, scallions, and garlic

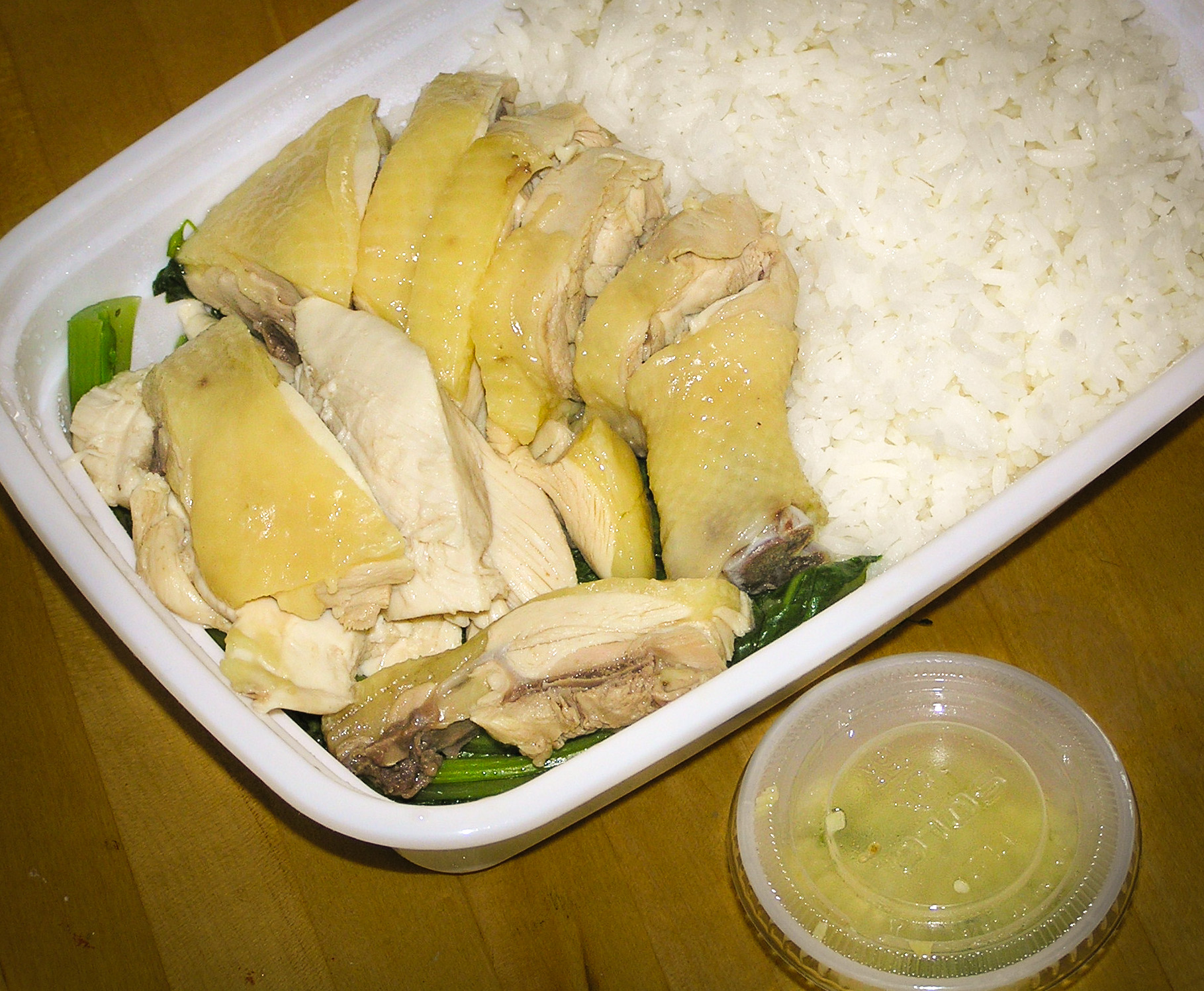
Dry version

== See also ==
- Hainanese chicken rice
- List of chicken dishes
