= Cantonese cuisine =

Chinese regional cuisine from Guangdong

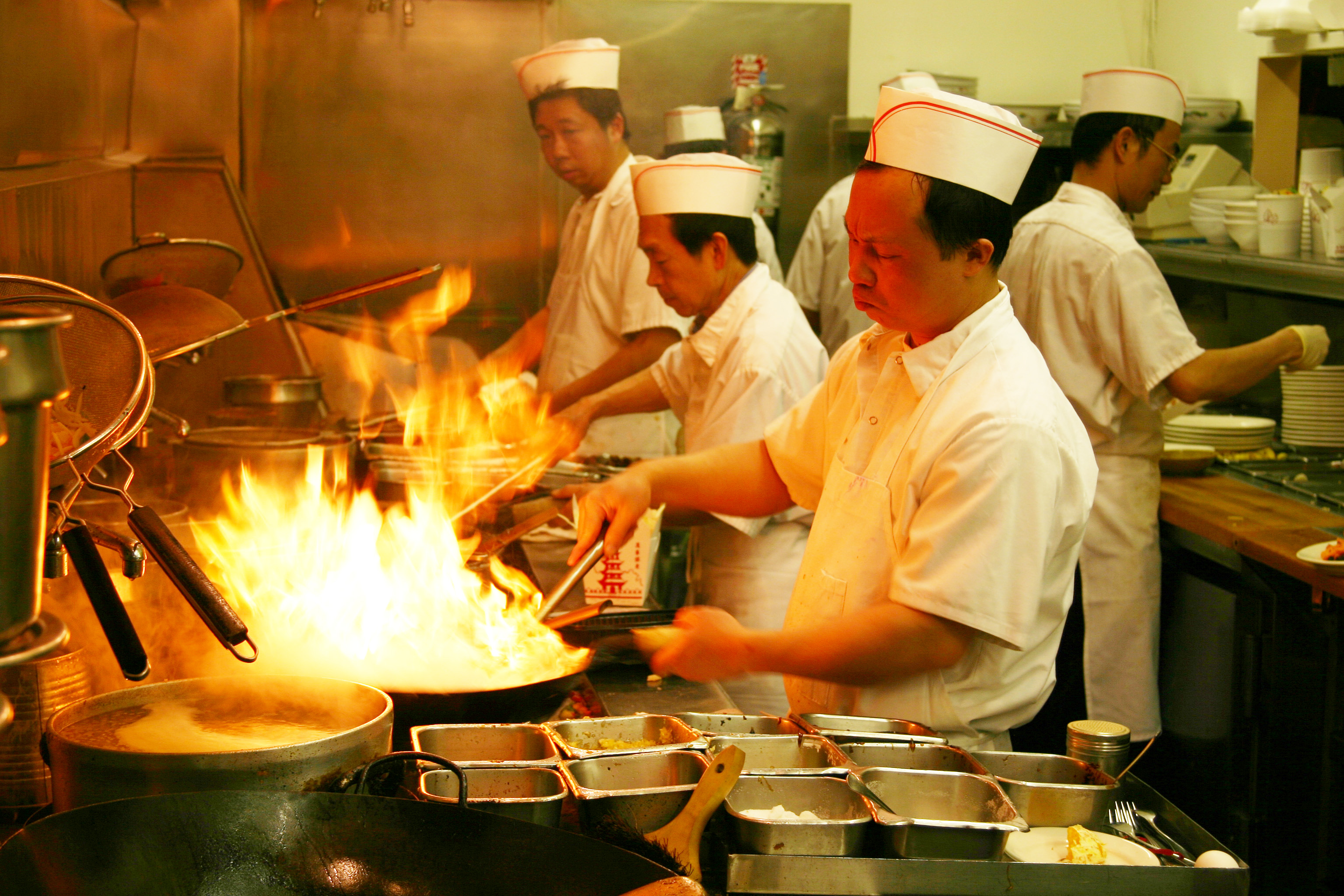
- Chefs cook with a wok
- Traditional Chinese: 廣東菜
- Simplified Chinese: 广东菜
- Jyutping: Gwong2 dung1 coi3
- Cantonese Yale: Gwóng dūng choi
Transcriptions
Standard Mandarin
- Hanyu Pinyin: Guǎngdōngcài
- Bopomofo: ㄍㄨㄤˇ ㄉㄨㄥ ㄘㄞˋ
- Wade–Giles: Kuang^{3}-tung^{1}-ts'ai^{4}
- Tongyong Pinyin: Guǎngdong-cài
- IPA: [kwàŋ.tʊ́ŋ.tsʰâɪ]
Yue: Cantonese
- Yale Romanization: Gwóng dūng choi
- Jyutping: Gwong2 dung1 coi3
- IPA: [kʷɔŋ˧˥tʊŋ˥tsʰɔj˧]

Yue cuisine
- Traditional Chinese: 粵菜
- Simplified Chinese: 粤菜
- Jyutping: Jyut6 coi3
- Cantonese Yale: Yuht choi
Transcriptions
Standard Mandarin
- Hanyu Pinyin: Yuècài
- Bopomofo: ㄩㄝˋ ㄘㄞˋ
- Wade–Giles: Yüeh^{4}-ts'ai^{4}
- Tongyong Pinyin: Yuè-cài
- IPA: [ɥê.tsʰâɪ]
Yue: Cantonese
- Yale Romanization: Yuht choi
- Jyutping: Jyut6 coi3
- IPA: [jyt̚˨tsʰɔj˧]

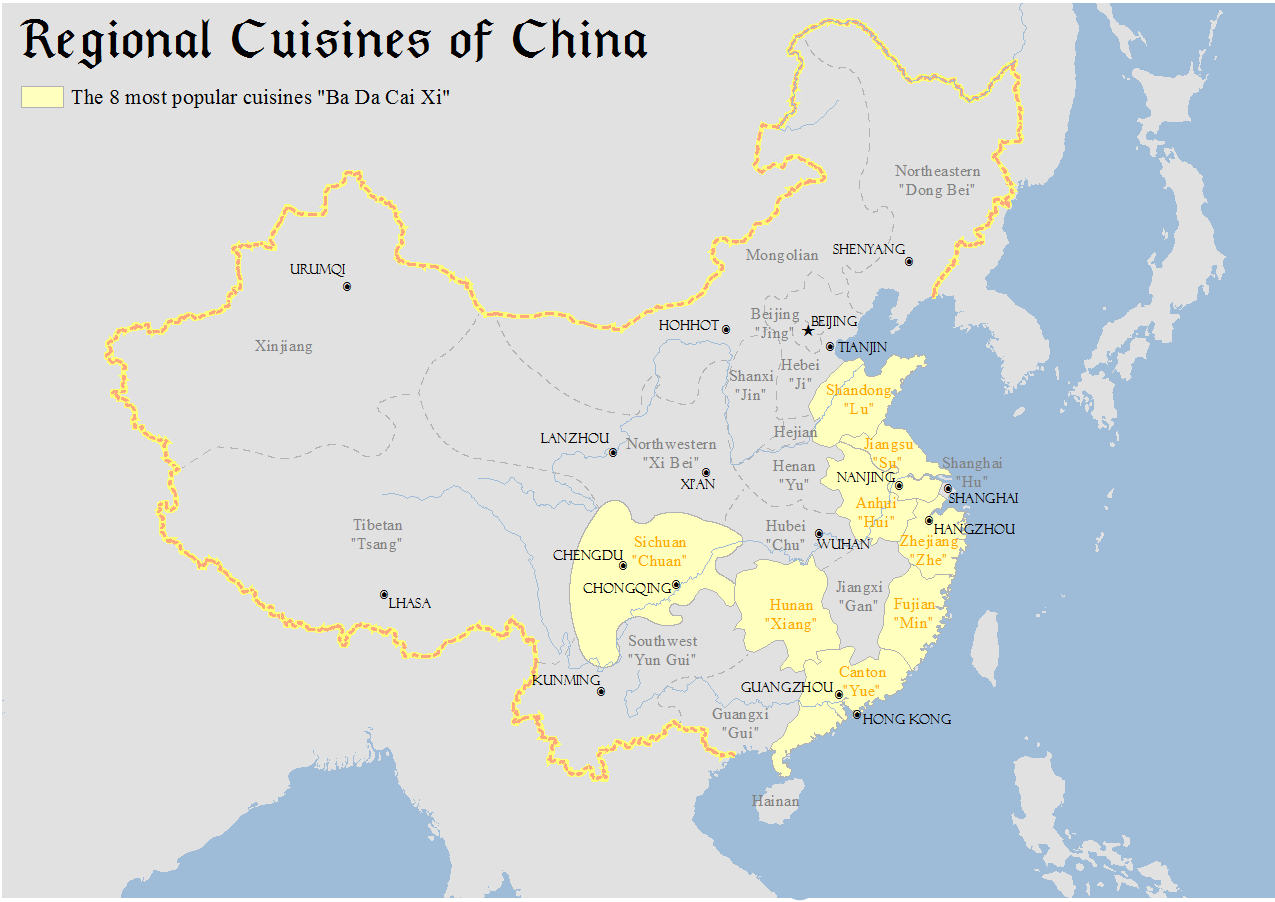
Map showing major regional cuisines of China

Cantonese cuisine (Note: also known as Guangdong cuisine or Yue cuisine (Chinese: 廣東菜 or 粵菜) is the cuisine of Cantonese people, a Han Chinese subgroup originating from the vicinity of Guangzhou and associated cities of the Pearl River Delta whose diaspora emigrated overseas and commodified its cuisine in the forms of mass franchises such as Panda Express which reexported its modifications back to Asia. Strictly speaking, Cantonese cuisine is the cuisine of Guangzhou or of Cantonese speakers, but it often includes the cooking styles of all the speakers of Yue Chinese languages in Guangdong.

The Teochew cuisine and Hakka cuisine of Guangdong are considered their own styles. However, scholars may categorize Guangdong cuisine into three major groups based on the region's dialect: Cantonese, Hakka and Teochew cuisines. Neighboring Guangxi's cuisine is also considered separate despite eastern Guangxi being considered culturally Cantonese due to the presence of ethnic Zhuang influences in the rest of the province.

Cantonese cuisine is one of the Eight Great Traditions of Chinese cuisine, and chefs trained in Cantonese cuisine are highly sought after throughout China. Its prominence outside China is due to the large number of Cantonese emigrants; until the late 20th century, most Chinese restaurants in the West served largely Cantonese dishes.

== Background ==
Guangzhou (Canton) City, the provincial capital of Guangdong and the heart of Cantonese culture, has long been a trading hub, and many ingredients of foreign origin are syncretized into Cantonese cuisine. During the early to middle Qing dynasty period from 1757 to 1842, Guangdong, known as Canton at the time, was the only port where trade was permitted between Chinese and foreign merchants. Cantonese cooks aimed to serve European tastes in restaurants, lending to an ongoing European influence on Cantonese cuisine. Staples of the European nobility diet at the time, particularly turtle soup, were available to British merchants and dignitaries visiting Guangdong. The British taught Cantonese cooks how to make the dish, with the Caribbean sea turtle typically used in Europe replaced by the Chinese softshell turtle. Besides pork, beef and chicken, Cantonese cuisine incorporates almost all edible meats, including offal, chicken feet, duck's tongue, frog legs, snakes and snails. Lamb and goat are less commonly used than in the cuisines of northern or western China. Many cooking methods are used, with steaming and stir-frying preferred due to convenience and speed.

Wok hei is the name given to the unique Cantonese cooking technique, emphasizing the energy, or hei, of the cooking vessel itself. Wok hei emphasizes the multiple tastes at play when cooking, using certain ingredients to balance the harshness of others. Additionally, dishes are typically cooked over a medium heat for a more prolonged period. A restaurant has wok hei if their dishes taste good, and the opposite is also true. This concept lends to a sense of superiority among Cantonese cooks with respect to the stir-fry technique. Other techniques include shallow frying, double steaming, braising and deep frying. Compared to other Chinese regional cuisines, most traditional Cantonese dishes should be well-balanced in taste and not greasy; spices should be used modestly to avoid overwhelming primary ingredients, which in turn should be at the peak of their freshness and quality. There is no widespread use of fresh herbs in Cantonese cooking, in contrast with their liberal use in other cuisines such as Szechwan, Viet, Lao, Thai and European. Garlic chives and cilantro leaves are notable exceptions, although the former are often used as a vegetable and the latter are typically used as mere garnish in most dishes.

Guangzhou’s notability in its restaurants, teahouses, and snack shops was targeted by the reforms of the CCP, as top party leaders made efforts to transform Guangzhou into an industrial powerhouse. Well-established culinary institutions were targeted as traditionalist remnants, replaced with communal-style eating halls. “Massification” became key to the reforming of Guangzhou’s culinary scene, with many oft imported delicacies such as sharkfin soup, bird's nest soup, and sea cucumber were swapped out with cheaper ingredients. Frugality was emphasized as a revolutionary ideal, with restaurants previously reserved for the wealthy elites now serving the working class, who had felt that these “Old Society” delicacies were withheld from them.

== Foods ==
=== Sauces and condiments ===
In Cantonese cuisine, ingredients such as sugar, salt, soy sauce, rice wine, corn starch, vinegar, scallion and sesame oil suffice to enhance tastes, although garlic is heavily used in some dishes, especially those in which internal organs, such as entrails, may emit unpleasant smells. Ginger, chili peppers, five-spice powder, powdered black pepper, star anise and a few other spices are also used, but often sparingly.

- Black bean sauce (蒜蓉豆豉醬; syun3 jung4 dau6 si6 zoeng3)
- Char siu sauce (叉燒醬; caa1 siu1 zoeng3)
- Chu hau paste (柱侯醬; cyu5 hau4 zoeng3)
- Hoisin sauce (海鮮醬; hoi2 sin1 zoeng3)
- Master stock (滷水; lou5 seoi2)
- Oyster sauce (蠔油; hou4 jau4)
- Plum sauce (蘇梅醬; sou1 mui4 zoeng3)
- Red vinegar (大紅浙醋; daai6 hung4 zit3 cou3)
- Shrimp paste (鹹蝦醬; haam4 haa1 zoeng3)
- Shrimp paste block (蝦膏; haa1 gou1)
- Sweet and sour sauce (糖醋醬; tong4 cou3 zoeng3)
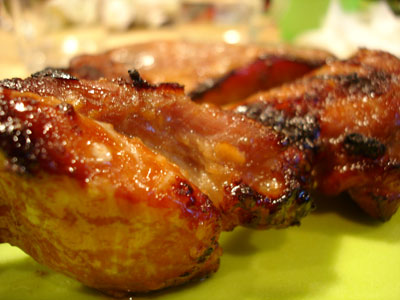
Char siu is often marinated with plum sauce and honey for sweetness

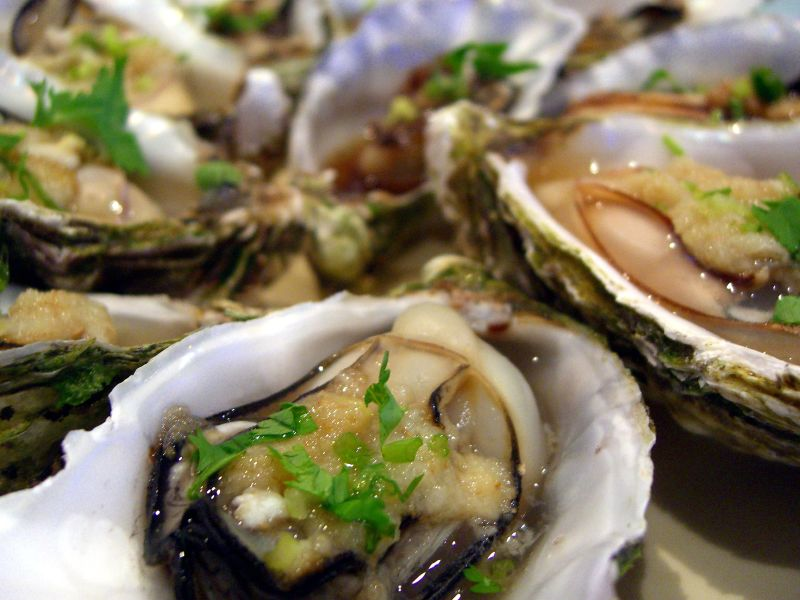
Oysters steamed in two ways: with ginger and garlic, and in black bean sauce

=== Dried and preserved ingredients ===
Although Cantonese cooks pay much attention to the freshness of their primary ingredients, Cantonese cuisine also uses a long list of preserved food items to add flavors to a dish. This may be influenced by Hakka cuisine, since the Hakkas were once a dominant group occupying imperial Hong Kong and other southern territories.

Some items undergo intense changes and flavor modification during the drying/preservation/oxidation process, as they are preserved to increase their shelf life. Some chefs combine both dried and fresh varieties of the same items in a dish. Dried items are usually soaked in water to rehydrate before cooking. These ingredients are generally not served à la carte, but rather with vegetables or other Cantonese dishes.

Image	English	Chinese	Notes
	Century egg	皮蛋; pei4 daan6	Can be found served with roasted dishes, in congee with lean pork, and in a sweet pastry with lotus paste.
	Chinese sausage	臘腸; laap6 coeng4	Usually added to claypot rice together with preserved (salted) meats; this form of claypot rice is called 臘味飯.
	Dried sea snail	螺頭; lo4 tau4; 螺片; lo4 pin3	Usually added to clear soup.
	Dried bok choy	菜乾; coi3 kin4	
	Dried scallops	江珧柱; gong1 jiu4 cyu5	Usually added to clear soup.
	Dried scallops	江瑤柱; gong1 jiu4 cyu5	Usually added to clear soup.
	Dried shrimp	蝦乾; haa1 kin4	Usually de-shelled, sliced into half and added to vegetable dishes.
	Dried small shrimp	蝦米; haa1 mai5	Usually mixed with stir-fried vegetables.
	Fermented tofu	腐乳; fu6 jyu5	
	Fermented black beans	豆豉; dau6 si6	Usually added to pork and tofu dishes.
	Mei cai	梅菜; mui4 coi3	Usually cooked with pork or stir-fried with rice.
	Chai poh / Dried preserved radish	菜脯; coi3 fu2	A key ingredient for making chai poh omelette.
	Preserved-salted duck	臘鴨; laap6 aap3	Usually eaten with rice in a family meal.
	Preserved-salted pork	臘肉; laap6 juk6	Usually eaten with rice in a family meal.
	Salted duck egg	鹹蛋; haam4 daan6	May be eaten as it is or mixed with stir-fried vegetables and steam dishes or cooked with cut pork in congee.
	Salted fish	鹹魚; haam4 jyu4	Usually paired with steamed pork or added to fried rice together with diced chicken.
	Suan cai	鹹酸菜; haam4 syun1 coi3	The key ingredient for making Haam Coi Pepper Hog Maw Soup (咸菜胡椒豬肚湯).
	Jinhua ham	金華火腿; gam1 waa4 fo2 teoi2	Usually added to clear soup.
	Tofu skin	腐皮; fu6 pei4	Usually used as wrapping for ground pork dishes. It is fried in a similar manner as spring rolls.

=== Traditional dishes ===
A number of dishes have been part of Cantonese cuisine since the earliest territorial establishments of Guangdong. While many of these are on the menus of typical Cantonese restaurants, some simpler ones are more commonly found in Cantonese homes. Home-made Cantonese dishes are usually served with plain white rice.

Image	English	Chinese
	Cantonese-style fried rice	廣式炒飯; gwong2 sik1 caau2 faan6
	Choy sum in oyster sauce	蠔油菜心; hou4 jau4 coi3 sam1
	Sampan congee	艇仔粥; ting5 zai2 zuk1
	Congee with lean pork and century egg	皮蛋瘦肉粥; pei4 daan6 sau3 juk6 zuk1
	Steamed egg	蒸水蛋; zing1 seoi2 daan6
	Steamed frog legs on lotus leaf	荷葉蒸田雞; ho4 jip6 zing1 tin4 gai1
	Steamed ground pork with salted duck egg	鹹蛋蒸肉餅; haam4 daan6 zing1 juk6 beng2
	Steamed spare ribs with fermented black beans and chilli pepper	豉椒排骨; si6 ziu1 paai4 gwat1
	Stewed beef brisket	柱侯牛腩; cyu5 hau4 ngau4 naam5
	Stir-fried hairy gourd with dried shrimp and cellophane noodles	大姨媽嫁女; daai6 ji4 maa1 gaa3 neoi5
	Stir-fried water spinach with shredded chilli and fermented tofu	椒絲腐乳通菜; ziu1 si1 fu6 jyu5 tung1 coi3
	Sweet and sour pork	咕嚕肉; gu1 lou1 juk6
	Shunde-style fish slices	順德魚生; seon6 dak1 jyu4 sang1

=== Deep-fried dishes ===
There are a small number of deep-fried dishes in Cantonese cuisine, which can often be found as street food. They have been extensively documented in colonial Hong Kong records of the 19th and 20th centuries. A few are synonymous with Cantonese breakfast and lunch, even though these are also part of other cuisines.

Image	English	Chinese
	Dace fish balls	鯪魚球; ling4 jyu4 kau4
	Youtiao; (also called "Chinese donut")	油炸鬼; jau4 zaa3 gwai2
	Ox-tongue pastry	牛脷酥; ngau4 lei6 sou1
	Zaa leung	炸兩; zaa3 loeng5

=== Soups ===
Old fire soup, or lou fo tong (老火湯; lou5 fo2 tong1), is a clear broth prepared by simmering meat and other ingredients over a low heat for several hours. Chinese herbs are often used as ingredients. There are basically two ways to make old fire soup – put ingredients and water in the pot and heat it directly on fire, which is called bou tong (煲湯; bou1 tong1), literally boiling soup; or put the ingredients in a small stew pot, and put it in a bigger pot filled with water, then heat the bigger pot on fire directly, which is called dun tong (燉湯; dan6 tong1). The latter way can keep the most original taste of the soup.

Soup chain stores or delivery outlets in cities with significant Cantonese populations, such as Hong Kong, serve this dish due to the long preparation time required of slow-simmered soup.

- Cantonese seafood soup (海皇羹; hoi2 wong4 gang1)
- Night-blooming cereus soup (霸王花煲湯; baa3 wong4 faa1 bou1 tong1)
- Snow fungus soup (銀耳湯; ngan4 ji5 tong1)
- Spare ribs soup with watercress and apricot kernels (南北杏西洋菜豬骨湯; naam4 bak1 hang6 sai1 joeng4 coi3 zyu1 gwat1 tong1)
- Winter melon soup (冬瓜湯; dung1 gwaa1 tong1)

=== Seafood ===
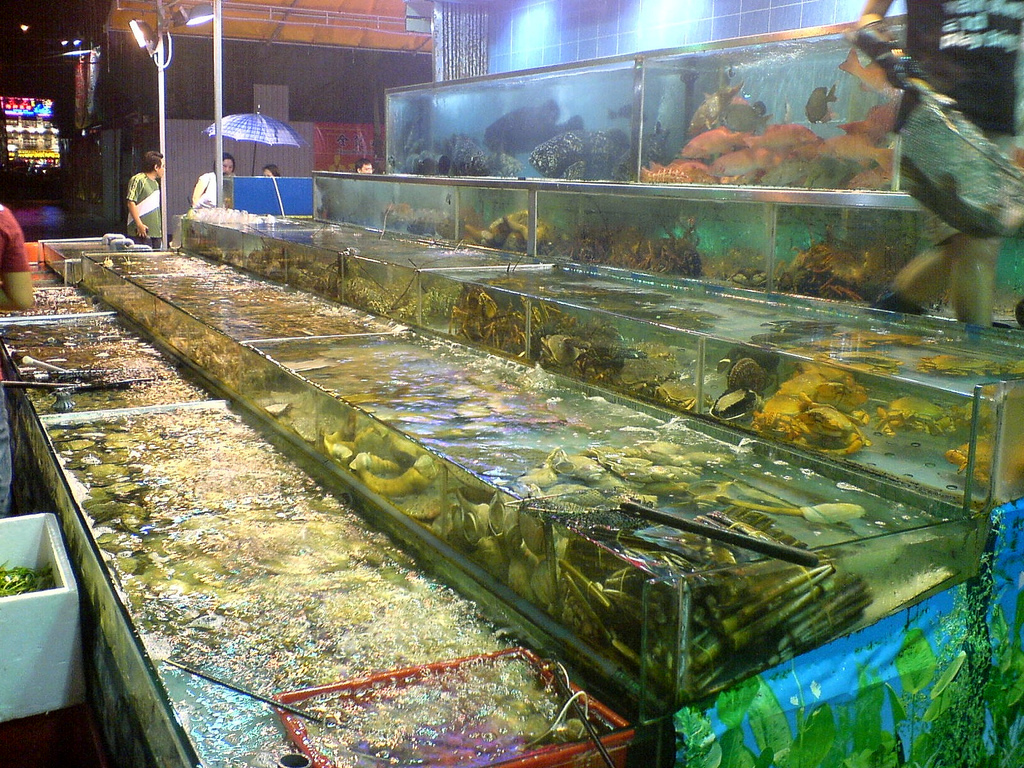
Seafood tanks in a Cantonese restaurant

Due to Guangdong's location along the South China Sea coast, fresh seafood is prominent in Cantonese cuisine, and many Cantonese restaurants keep aquariums or seafood tanks on the premises. In Cantonese cuisine, as in cuisines from other parts of Asia, if seafood has a repugnant smell, strong spices and marinating juices are added; the freshest seafood is odorless and, in Cantonese culinary arts, is best cooked by steaming. For instance, in some recipes, only a small amount of soy sauce, ginger and spring onion is added to steamed fish. In Cantonese cuisine, the light seasoning is used only to bring out the natural sweetness of the seafood. As a rule of thumb, the spiciness of a dish is usually negatively correlated to the freshness of the ingredients.

Image	English	Chinese
	Lobster with ginger and scallions	薑蔥龍蝦; goeng1 cung1 lung4 haa1
	Lobster with e-fu noodles in soup; Cheese lobster with e-fu noodles	上湯龍蝦伊麵; soeng6 tong1 lung4 haa1 ji1 min6; 芝士龍蝦伊麵; zi1 si6 lung4 haa1 ji1 min6
	Mantis shrimp	攋尿蝦; laai6 niu6 haa1
	Orange cuttlefish	鹵水墨魚; lou5 seoi2 mak6 jyu4
	Steamed fish	蒸魚; zing1 jyu4
	Steamed scallops with ginger and garlic	蒜茸蒸扇貝; syun3 jung4 zing1 sin3 bui3
	White boiled shrimp	白灼蝦; baak6 coek3 haa1

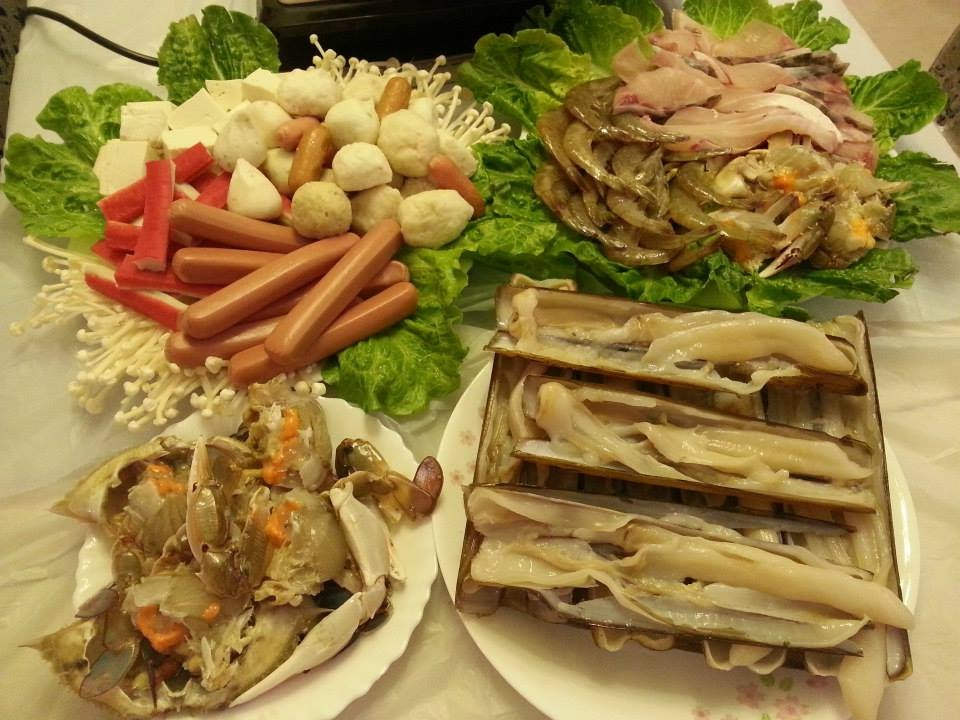
Typical ingredients for Cantonese-style hotpot are razor shell (蟶子), crab (蟹), prawn (蝦), chicken sausage (雞肉腸仔) and dace fishball (魚蛋).

=== Noodle dishes ===
Noodles are served either in soup broth or fried. These are available as home-cooked meals, on dim sum side menus, or as street food at dai pai dongs, where they can be served with a variety of toppings such as fish balls, beef balls, or fish slices.

Image	English	Chinese	Notes
	Beef brisket noodles	牛腩麵; ngau4 naam5 min6	May be served dry or in soup.
	Beef chow fun	乾炒牛河; kin4 caau2 ngau4 ho4	Fried beef noodles made with hor-fun, typically chilli oil is also added. Normally cooked till dry.
	Chow mein	炒麵; caau2 min6	A generic term for various stir-fried noodle dishes. Hong Kong-style chow mein is made from pan-fried thin crispy noodles.
	Jook-sing noodles	竹昇麵; zuk1 sing1 min6	Bamboo log pressed noodles.
	Lo mein	撈麵; laau4 min6	Boiled wheat noodles mixed with a sauce, or served with a sauce alongside. Traditionally not stir-fried.
	Rice noodle roll	腸粉; coeng4 fan2	Also known as chee cheong fun.
	Shahe fen	河粉	Also known as hor-fun.
	Rice noodles	米粉; mai5 fan2	Also known as rice vermicelli
	Silver needle noodles	銀針粉; ngan4 zam1 fan2	Also known as loh shu fun (老鼠粉, lit. 'rat noodles').
	Yi mein	伊麵; ji1 min6	Also known as e-fu noodles.
	Wonton noodles	雲吞麵; wan4 tan1 min6	Sometimes spelled as wanton noodles.

=== Siu mei ===
Siu mei (燒味; siu1 mei6) is essentially the Chinese rotisserie style of cooking. Unlike most other Cantonese dishes, siu mei solely consists of meat, with no vegetables.

All Cantonese-style cooked meats, including siu mei, lou mei and preserved meat can be classified as siu laap (燒臘; siu1 laap6).

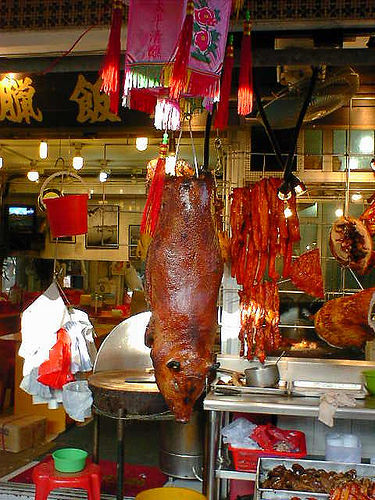
A roasted pig and char siu

Image	English	Chinese
	Char siu	叉燒; caa1 siu1
	Poached duck in master stock	滷水鴨; lou5 seoi2 aap3
	Roast duck	燒鴨; siu1 aap3
	Roast goose	燒鵝; siu1 ngo4
	Roast pigeon	燒乳鴿; siu1 jyu5 gap3
	Siu laap platter	燒臘拼盤; siu1 laap6 ping1 pun4
	Siu mei platter	燒味拼盤; siu1 mei6 ping1 pun4
	Siu yuk	燒肉; siu1 juk6
	Soy sauce chicken	豉油雞; si6 jau4 gai1
	White cut chicken	白切雞; baak6 cit3 gai1; 白斬雞; baak6 zaam2 gai1

=== Lou mei ===
Lou mei (卤味; 滷味; lǔ wèi; lou5 mei6) is the name given to dishes made from internal organs, entrails and other left-over parts of animals. It is widely available in southern Chinese regions.

Image	English	Chinese
	Beef entrails	牛雜; ngau4 zaap6
	Beef brisket	牛腩
	Chicken scraps	雞雜; gai1 zaap6
	Duck gizzard	鴨腎; aap3 san5
	Pig's tongue	豬脷; zyu1 lei6

=== Meat and rice plates ===
A portion of meat, such as char siu, served on a bed of steamed white rice. A typical variant consists of half-and-half portions of two types of siu mei and lou mei (or sometimes more than two). A steamed vegetable (such as choy sum) is frequently, but not always included.

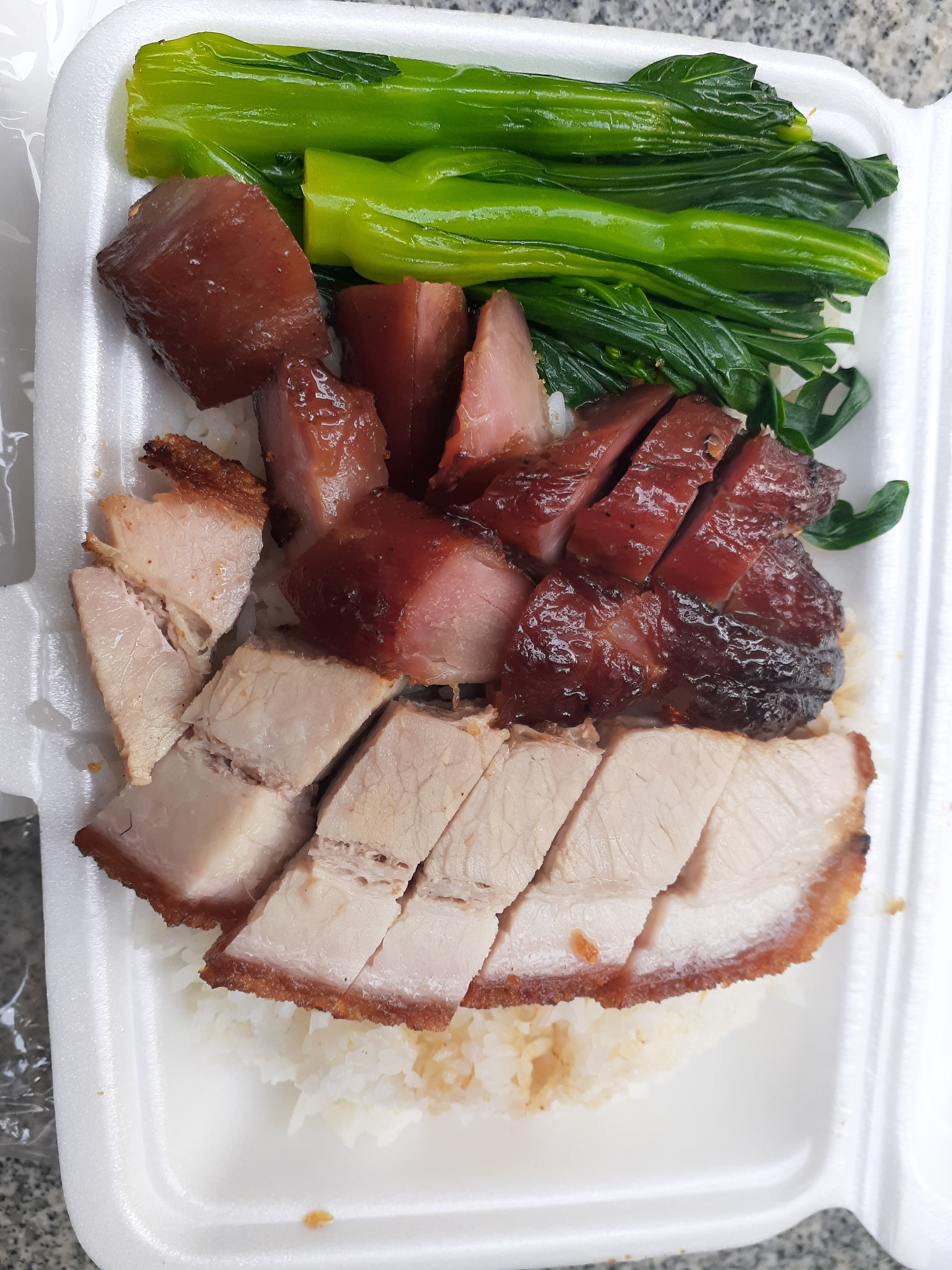
Rice with char siu and siu yuk

- Rice with char siu and siu yuk (叉燒燒肉飯; caa1 siu1 siu1 juk6 faan6)
- Rice with Chinese sausage and char siu (臘腸叉燒飯; laap6 coeng4 caa1 siu1 faan6)
- Rice with roast goose and goose intestines (燒鵝鵝腸飯; siu1 ngo4 ngo4 coeng4 faan6)

=== Claypot rice ===
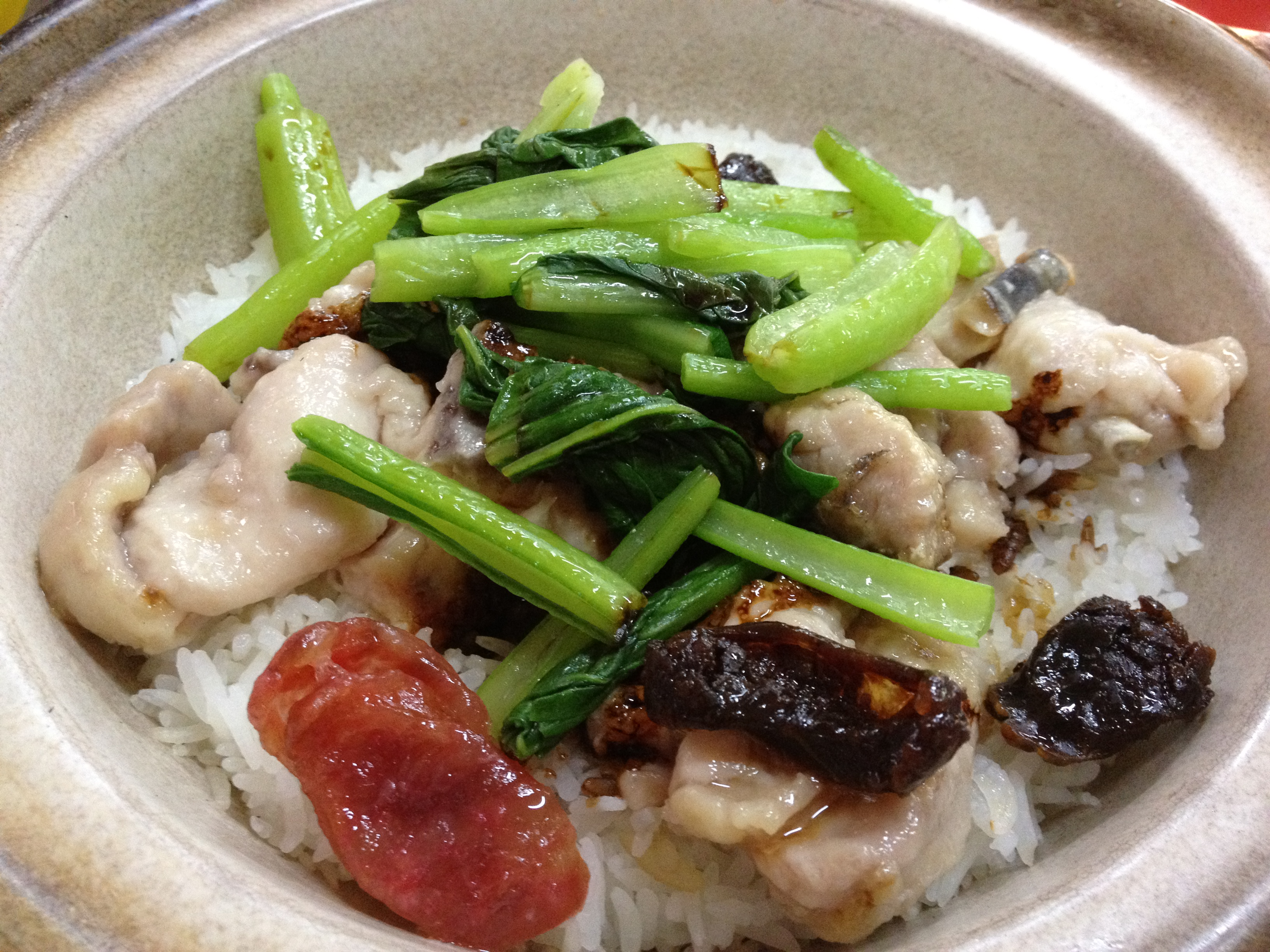
Little pot chicken rice with vegetable and Chinese sausage

Claypot rice (煲仔飯; 煲仔饭; bou1 zai2 faan6; bāozǎifàn) are dishes cooked and served in a flat-bottomed pot (as opposed to a round-bottomed wok). Usually this is a saucepan or braising pan (see clay pot cooking). Such dishes are cooked by covering and steaming, making the rice and ingredients very hot and soft. Usually the ingredients are layered on top of the rice with little or no mixing in between. Many standard combinations exist.

- Rice with Chinese sausage and preserved meat (臘味煲仔飯; laap6 mei6 bou1 zai2 faan6)
- Rice with layered egg and beef (窩蛋牛肉飯; wo1 daan6 ngau4 juk6 faan6)
- Rice with minced beef patty (肉餅煲仔飯; juk6 beng2 bou1 zai2 faan6)
- Rice with spare ribs (排骨煲仔飯; paai4 gwat1 bou1 zai2 faan6)
- Rice with steamed chicken (蒸雞肉煲仔飯; zing1 gai1 juk6 bou1 zai2 faan6)

=== Banquet and dinner dishes ===
A number of dishes are traditionally served in Cantonese restaurants only at dinner time. Said banquets were typically served in the capital's famous tea houses. Guangzhou’s tea houses have historically served as meeting places for the public, where political movements could foment and lead to action. The main draw of these tea houses was to enjoy dim sum. While eating dim sum in tea houses grew in popularity during the nineteenth century, the different snacks and small bites that were enjoyed grew Guangzhou staples to encompassing culinary traditions from China’s numerous provinces. After the Qing’s defeat in the first Opium War, culinary influences outside of China found their way into the dim sum served at tea houses, with ingredients such as Worcestershire sauce and Ketchup becoming staple ingredients. Dim sum restaurants stop serving bamboo-basket dishes after the yum cha period (equivalent to afternoon tea) and begin offering an entirely different menu in the evening. Some dishes are standard while others are regional. Some are customised for special purposes such as Chinese marriages or banquets. Salt and pepper dishes are one of the few spicy dishes.

Image	English	Chinese
	Crispy fried chicken	炸子雞; zaa3 zi2 gai1
	Duck with taro	陳皮芋頭鴨; can4 pei4 wu6 tau4 aap3
	Fried tofu with shrimp	蝦仁炒豆腐; haa1 jan4 caau2 dau6 fu6
	Lettuce wrap (San Choy Bow)	生菜包; sang1 coi3 baau1
	Pork chop with salt and pepper	椒鹽豬扒; ziu1 jim4 zyu1 paa4
	Roast pigeon	乳鴿; jyu5 gap3
	Roast suckling pig	燒乳豬; siu1 jyu5 zyu1
	Seafood with bird's nest	海鮮雀巢; hoi2 sin1 zoek3 caau4
	Shrimp with salt and pepper	椒鹽蝦; ziu1 jim4 haa1
	Sour spare ribs	生炒排骨; sang1 caau2 paai4 gwat1
	Spare ribs with salt and pepper	椒鹽骨; ziu1 jim4 gwat1
	Squid with salt and pepper	椒鹽魷魚; ziu1 jim4 jau4 jyu4
	Yangzhou fried rice	揚州炒飯; joeng4 zau1 caau2 faan6

=== Dessert ===
After the evening meal, most Cantonese restaurants offer tong sui (糖水; tong4 seoi2, lit. 'sugar water'), a sweet soup. Many varieties of tong sui are also found in other Chinese cuisines. Some desserts are traditional, while others are recent innovations. The more expensive restaurants usually offer their specialty desserts. Sugar water is the general name of dessert in Guangdong province. It is cooked by adding water and sugar to some other cooking ingredients.

Image	English	Chinese
	Black sesame soup	芝麻糊; zi1 maa4 wu4
	Coconut pudding	椰汁糕; je4 zap1 gou1
	Double skin milk	雙皮奶; soeng1 pei4 naai5
	Mung bean soup	綠豆沙; luk6 dau6 saa1
	Red bean soup	紅豆沙; hung4 dau6 saa1
	Sago soup	西米露; sai1 mai5 lou6
	Shaved ice	刨冰; paau4 bing1
	Steamed egg custard	燉蛋; dan6 daan6
	Steamed milk custard	燉奶; dan6 naai5
	Sweet Chinese pastry	糕點; gou1 dim2
	Sweet potato soup	番薯糖水; faan1 syu4 tong4 seoi2
	Tofu flower pudding	豆腐花; dau6 fu6 faa1
	Tortoise Jelly	龜苓膏; gwai1 ling4 gou1

=== Delicacies ===
Certain Cantonese delicacies consist of parts taken from rare or endangered animals, which raises controversy over animal rights and environmental issues. This is often due to alleged health benefits of certain animal products. For example, the continued spreading of the idea that shark cartilage can cure cancer has led to decreased shark populations even though scientific research has found no evidence to support the credibility of shark cartilage as a cancer cure. Consumption of shark fin soup dates back to the Song dynasty, with the dish ultimately becoming ingrained into Cantonese food culture and Chinese food culture as a whole in the royal banquets of the Ming. Conservation efforts by the Chinese government and various NGOs have been historically difficult to implement. It can be difficult for fishermen who rely on the sale of shark fins to adopt alternative occupations, in addition to corruption at the local level impeding attempts at dismantling the shark fin trade.

Image	English	Chinese
	Bird's nest soup	燕窝; jin3 wo1
	Braised abalone	炆鮑魚; man1 baau1 jyu4
	Jellyfish	海蜇; hoi2 zit3
	Sea cucumber	海參; hoi2 caam1
	Shark fin soup	魚翅湯; jyu4 ci3 tong1

== See also ==
- Cantonese culture
- Chinese food therapy
- Dim sum
- Hong Kong cuisine
- List of Chinese dishes
- Macanese cuisine
- Restaurant industry in Guangzhou
