= Baobing =

Baobing may refer to:

- Báobǐng (薄餅, also pronounced bóbĭng), the Chinese catch-all term to refer to pastry with a thin wrapper or flat dough, including:
  - Popiah, a Fujianese/Teochew-style spring roll called báobǐng in Mandarin
  - Lumpia, Indonesian and Filipino adaptation of popiah sometimes called báobǐng in Mandarin
  - Pizza, sometimes referred to as "Italian baobing" in Chinese
  - Tortilla, "Mexican baobing" in Chinese
  - Naan, sometimes called "Indian baobing" in Chinese
- Bàobīng (刨冰), shaved ice in Mandarin
  - Chhoah-peng, Taiwanese shaved ice called bàobīng in Mandarin
- Bàobīng (抱冰), pseudonym of Zhang Zhidong (1837–1909), Qing dynasty politician
