= Restaurant industry in Guangzhou =

Restaurants in Guangzhou serves a wide range of food items, with each pertaining to specific ingredients or dishes. Most commercial restaurants in the city were established in the late Qing period and boomed in the early Republican period. The city came under siege in 1938, during the Second Sino-Japanese War. In this period, many restaurants ceased operation or were destroyed from warfare. Following the 1945 Chinese victory, the restaurant industry in Guangzhou once again boomed, pertaining to the city's population and economy boom.

With the communist takeover in late 1949, many restaurateurs fled the city, leaving many restaurant operating at limited capacity. In the 1950s, most restaurants first became joint ventures before becoming fully nationalized during the Great Leap Forward. Major establishments also saw renovation and expansion in this period and became venues for official reception. The Cultural Revolution saw closure, renaming, and restructuring of gastronomic establishments throughout the city. Many restaurants survived the period and restored their original name and original service menus.

Since the reform and opening up, meeting exponentially growing demands and patronage, many restaurants expanded their operation and renovated their venues.

== History ==
=== Imperial Period ===
As a major commercial port and provincial capital, along with a wide range of geographical features surrounding the locality, Guangzhou has historically been endowed with a dynamic culinary culture. Since the early medieval period, culinary practices in the region representing contemporary Guangzhou confluenced with those introduced from the various Chinese imperial territories, as well as from overseas. For the rest of the imperial period, the region's culinary culture continued to interact with their counterparts in places far and near.

Guangzhou's identity as a commercial port continued to see reinforcement in the Qing times, with commerce and wars engendering a vibrant economy surrounding food and drink services. Restaurant industry began to take hold in the city as a major economic sector. Restaurants in Guangzhou catered to an increasingly diverse population. Banquet halls (花酌馆, Flower and Wine Halls) represented high end dining, combining in one place a restaurant, a brothel, and a casino; for the wider public, restaurants (酒楼, wine halls) offers meals among a few tables and private rooms, tea houses (茶肆, tea places) often took shape as street side tents with a few tables and chairs.

In late Qing, Guangzhou's restaurant industry boomed along with the city's flourishing domestic and overseas trades. This period witnessed the birth of Guangzhou's tea house culture, where the establishment served tea and snacks. In 1860, Xu Laogao established the Taiping Restaurant (太平馆, Taiping Hall), the first major Western-style restaurant in the city. The rest of the restaurant industry also expanded in scale and number, serving a wide range of audience. To this point, Guangzhou's restaurant industry became a major component of the city's commercial economy.

=== Republican Period ===
In the Republican period, Guangzhou's restaurant industry experienced growth and decline, as the new state experienced period of peace and warfare. The period saw the establishment of various notable restaurants and tea houses, many of which lasted to the present as time-honored brands (老字号).

The restaurant industry amassed an ever larger and diverse workforce. In 1920, a restaurant named Equal Rights Women's Teahouse (平权女子茶室), marking the first time in which women joined the restaurant workforce. Following the establishment of the Women's Teahouse, restaurants and teahouses around the city began to hire female workers.

Guangzhou saw relative social and political stability in the late 1920s and most of the 1930s, the number of gastronomic establishments soared. Restaurants and teahouses expanded with growing business demand, with some major establishments offering 300 – 400 seats. Many restaurants also served tea and dim sum in the morning, taking on the role of dedicated teahouses. High end establishments served increasingly exquisite ingredients, such as shark fins, birds’ nests, and other dry goods. Banquet culture among officials and the wealthy became standardized in high end establishments in various formats, such as the “ten pieces,” the “eight big and eight small dishes (八大碟八小碟)” with meat and vegetable dishes both hot and cold, and the lower end “six big and six small dishes” banquet. Many restaurants integrated both gastronomic and entertainment functions, where patrons smoked opium, gambled, solicited prostitutes, and commissioned singers. In the booming industry, Guangzhou's restaurant-goers identified four major establishments – the Wenyuan (文园, Wen Garden), Nanyuan (南园, South Garden), Dasanyuan (大三元), and Xiyuan (西园, West Garden).

In 1938, Japanese forces invaded and conquered Guangzhou. In this period, many restaurants were destroyed or closed, as restaurant owners fled the war. After the Chinese victory in 1945, despite the Civil War between the Kuomintang and the Communist Party in the north, the restaurant industry in Guangzhou once again boomed. In 1948, the recorded number of restaurants, teahouses, and eateries reached 12,000. Competition grew increasingly fierce in the industry, and business owners each came up with various ways to attract patrons. Some restaurants such as the Zhongyang Dining Hall (中央餐厅, Central Dining Hall) opened a dance hall, whereas the famous Tao Tao Ju (陶陶居) hung famous paintings and calligraphy, both as efforts to attract business. Restaurants and teahouses became increasingly synonymous, with some serving both dim sum and regular meals during all meal periods.

=== The People's Republic of China ===
==== Early PRC ====
The power transition that took place in 1949 resulted in a significant decline in Guangzhou's restaurant industry. According to the 1996 Guangzhou Gazetteer, in that year, the registered number of food and drink establishments in the city dropped sharply from the 1948 figure of 12,000 to 1,380. Though this number is likely an underestimation due to the relatively late establishment of the Guangzhou municipal government in late October that year.

The restaurant industry would recover briefly and to a limited extent in the early 1950s. Many major establishments re-opened in 1945, though only with partial capacity. For instance, the Beiyuan (北园, North Garden) Restaurant, which was destroyed during the Second Sino-Japanese War, operated near the original site in tents made of bamboo. During the New Democracy period between 1949 – 1952, market condition stabilized, and the restaurant industry began to recover. By 1952, registered food and drink establishment rose to 4,861, with a workforce of 17,059. The same year, the restaurant industry in Guangzhou recorded a retail revenue of 49.66 million Yuan, taking up 12.8% of the city's total retail revenue.

==== Socialist Transformation ====
During the First Five Year plan (1953 – 1957), the restaurant industry in Guangzhou a general decline. In 1953, the industry's retail revenue reached 78.52 million Yuan, taking up 15.3% of the city's total retail revenue. In the following year, the municipal government pushed for publicly owned dining establishments by establishing numerous public canteens. With this push for public establishments, the government prioritized material supply away from the privately owned restaurants. This resulted in a drop in revenue by almost 14 million Yuan in 1955, a 3% drop in its proportion in the city's retail revenue. The year also marked the establishment of the first joint venture restaurant, a result of an ownership reconfiguration in the Datong (大同, Grand Unification) Restaurant.

The year 1956 saw the establishment of the Guangzhou Food and Drinks Company (广州饮食业公司), marking the beginning of unified management. Also took place that year is the whole sale ownership transition in the whole industry, forming joint ventures through official purchases. For smaller establishments, the government implemented a “closure, combine, and migrate (撤、并、迁)” policy, combining two to three smaller establishments into one. By the end of the year, the number of registered gastronomic establishments dropped by almost half, from 1952's 4,861 to 2,801, though the workforce remained relatively stable, declining 14,354 from 1952's 17,059.

The Food and Drinks Company also began to classify gastronomic establishments in the city. In the 1956 classification scheme, each of the city's establishments will fall into one of the seven categories – teahouses, banquet halls, restaurants, snack shops, dessert shops, ice shops, and herbal tea shops. Each category provides a different set of goods and services. For instance, the teahouses and banquet halls serves brunch, lunch, dinner, as well as formal banquets; the restaurants do not serve brunch; snack shops may serve congee and noodles, but does not serve rice, lunch and dinner dishes, or liquor.

The same year also marked the city's first attempts to professionalize and promote local culinary practices. Between June 1 and July 1 of 1956, the Food and Drinks Company held an exhibition for famous dishes and delicate dim sums. The exhibition committee tallied 5,457 dishes, 825 varieties of dim sums, 273 kinds of snacks, and 28 types of cooking methods in Guangzhou's culinary trade. Professional certification also took place for the first time since the founding of the People's Republic.

Major establishments also saw renovation of major establishments. That year, the Datong Restaurant, the Guangzhou Restaurant, Taiping Guan (太平馆, Hall of Peace), and Beiyuan (北园, North Garden) Restaurant saw repairs and expansion. According to the 1996 Gazetteer, for reasons unspecified, the number of registered establishments more than doubled, reaching 5,728; the workforce also saw growth to 19,674 – marking a new peak in both establishment and workforce headcount since the founding of the People's Republic. Retail revenue grew to 97.11 million Yuan (an almost 50% growth compared to the 1955 figures), but only represented marginal growth in relation to the city's total retail revenue compared to the preceding year (13.5% in 1956, versus 12.2% in 1955).

==== Great Leap Forward and Famine ====
The restaurant industry in Guangzhou saw significant decline during the Great Leap Forward, and especially so during the famine that followed. One of the contributing factors is a city-wide readjustment of workforce, where restaurant workers were drafted into industrial and transport sectors. Most of the drafted workers were men, and despite industry-wide effort to hire female workers to fill in the labor gap, the sudden withdrawal of trained personnel meant that service standards declined since the beginning of the Great Leap Forward. In 1958, the city government also enacted a radical mandate to nationalize all gastronomic establishments as “enterprises owned by the whole people (全民所有制),” a principal policy for all state-owned enterprises in China. The retail revenue in the restaurant industry declined by 10.56 million Yuan, to an 11.3% proportion of the city's total retail revenue.

The restaurant industry remained operational in the city, though the city's Food and Drinks Company implemented austerity measures to counter the dwindling food supply. Restaurants reduced supply standards to one round of each meal in each day, on the basis of availability. The austerity measures demanded “paying special attention to special demographics, guaranteeing supply for important patrons, and making arrangements for the general public (照顾特殊，保证重点，安排一般)” for the city's establishments, specifically:

- Special patrons, such as advanced intellectuals, Hong Kong and Macau residents, overseas Chinese, foreign visitors, and subjects to official reception, were directed to 11 designated “famous establishments.” At each of the “famous establishment,” implement a policy of “five set and one exclusive (五定一专),” serving set varieties at set prices, set portions, and set quality for set patrons; directing exclusive resources and ingredients for exclusive uses. At these establishments, patrons were required to present special vouchers.
- Reclassifying select banquet halls and restaurants into so-called “high-end establishments (高级店),” where the individual establishments procured non-staple foodstuff at high prices from collective farms to create high-end dishes, and selling the end product at similarly high prices.
- Substituting refined ingredients with coarse alternatives – using ground sugar cane fiber and rice stalk as substitute ingredients for breads and cakes. For other dishes, restaurants reduced egg and meat content, and substituted savory items for formerly sweet items.

Peculiarly, due to the dwindling supply of non-staple produce in the retail market, urban residents turned to the restaurants for their meals. In 1960, the retail revenue in the city's restaurant industry soared to 118.72 million Yuan, the highest point before 1978.

==== Post-Famine Period ====
Leading up to, and into, the post-famine period between 1963 and 1966, the municipal government reversed numerous Great Leap Forward policies in regard to the restaurant industry. Between 1959 and 1963, the municipal government reverted nationalization of the smaller establishments and encouraged formation of collective enterprises to reclaim these establishments.

In this period, the municipal government actively sought restoration and expansion of the city's restaurant industry. In 1963, a wave of reconstruction and expansion of older and recognized establishments such as Dasanyuan (大三元) and Nanyuan (南园, South Garden), as well as establishment of new restaurants took place. A new policy to eliminate high-end items coupled with a directive to “appreciate both elegance and vulgarity (雅俗共赏)” in major establishments, resuming production of refined food items, while demanding that such establishments provide affordable dishes for the general public. In an effort to promote competition and improvement of service standards, in 1964, the Food and Drinks Company resumed culinary competition among establishments.

However, in the aftermath of the famine, the restaurant industry continued to see decline in both scale and revenue. In 1964, Guangzhou restaurant industry's retail revenue dropped to 78.93 million Yuan, only taking up 9.5% of the city's total retail revenue. This prompted a radical effort to renew the previous closure and combining of establishments. By 1965, the number of registered establishments dropped sharply from 1957's 5,728 to 1,529. Despite stabilizing ingredient supply to the city, the radical closure and combination of gastronomic establishments and the resultant uneven distribution made it difficult for consumers to find nearby eateries.

==== The Cultural Revolution ====
The Cultural Revolution of 1966 brought significant disruption to Guangzhou's restaurant industry. At the start of the movement, the slogan "Eat in Guangzhou" was banned from official use (being viewed as a symbol of decadence). The politics of the Cultural Revolution led to the cancellation of dim sum and tea meals in teahouses and other establishments, as well as a radical push for “self service,” where the customers had to make their own tea, fetch their own food, and wash their own dishes.

By 1970, the industry's retail revenue reached the lowest point since 1957, at 78.18 million Yuan, making up less than 9% of the city's retail revenues.

Service and food standards continued to decline in the decade since 1966. Despite central directive to restore and replenish restaurant staff struggled or exiled to collective farms, food and drinks establishments in Guangzhou struggled to provide basic food items. Many establishments’ service standards reverted to near famine-time standards, resorting to using substitute ingredients in many dishes, or failed to provide a range of items altogether. Sugar was in shortage in many establishments, where chefs were forced to use condensed milk and candied gourds as sweeteners; meat shortage was also prevalent, with fresh meat replaced with preserved or canned meat, or substitute meat sources such as rabbits – meat ration for consumers leveled at 4 qian (roughly 12.5 grams) per day.

The decade also saw radical push to merge smaller establishments, despite a slowly growing workforce, radical merger resulted in a registered establishment count of only 502 in 1975, less than a third of the 1965 figure.

==== Statistics and Figures ====
Change in Ratio of Establishment Count/Restaurant Workforce to Municipal Population
Year	Population	Establishment Count	Establish-to-Population Ratio	Workforce Headcount	Percentage of Population in Restaurant Workforce
1956	1,991,692	2,801	1:711	14,354	0.72%
1965	2,540,688	1,529	1:1661	13,598	0.54%
1975	2,688,779	503	1:5345	16,571	0.62%
1985	3,288,825	7,378	1:446	62,814	1.91%
1990	3,579,360	7,158	1:500	70,903	1.98%

Change in Retail Revenue
Year	Retail Revenue (in Million Yuan)
1957	97.11
1962	118.92
1965	75.25
1970	78.18
1975	110.68
1978	137.45
1983	288.02
1988	1,592.75
1990	2,167.01

== Notable Establishments ==
=== Taiping Guan (太平馆) ===
Established in 1860 by Xu Laogao (徐老高), the Taiping Guan is Guangzhou's first Western-style establishment. Xu started his entrepreneurial career as a street side steak vendor. Gaining popularity, Xu built the original Taiping Guan in a three-story wood structure building, and opened a second location in 1927, which became the main location in the present.

In the Republican era, Taiping Guan became a place for high-end dining. The restaurant served a series of popular dishes, including seared steak and pork chops, roasted pigeon, and Galinha à portuguesa. In 1925, Zhou Enlai invited alumni from the Whampoa Military Academy after his wedding with Deng Yinchao.

The restaurant's history since the beginning of the Second Sino-Japanese War has been tumultuous. In 1938, the restaurant closed as Guangzhou came under siege by the Japanese army. The restaurant briefly re-opened after the war, between 1945 and 1949. In the aftermath of Communist takeover, the municipal government directed a reduction of Western-style restaurants in Guangzhou. As a result, Taiping Guan closed all but one of its new locations. In 1959, Zhou Enlai and Chen Yi suggested an expansion of the restaurant, such that it could be used for receiving foreign envoys. By 1963, Taiping Guan has 500 seating, increasingly from 200 before the expansion.

During the early years of the Cultural Revolution, Taiping Guan was renamed Dongfeng Guan (东风馆, Easterly Wind Hall) and replaced all Western-style furnishing, utensils, and items with their Chinese counterparts. In 1973, to help with reception of foreign envoys at the Canton Fair, Taiping Guan reverted to its original name and resumed Western-style service.

In 1988, the restaurant closed for renovation, and reopened on November 18, 1990.

=== Taotao Ju (陶陶居) ===
Established in 1880 by Huang Dengbo, Taotao Ju did not enjoy success in its early days. Following Huang's death, the restaurant would soon go bankrupt in 1926. The restaurant was resurrected in May 1927 by five notable figures in Guangzhou's restaurant industry – namely, Tan Huanzhang from Jinhua Teahouse (金华茶楼), Tan Jienan from Xianxiang Teahouse (涎香茶楼), Chen Boyi from Zhenhailou (镇海楼), Zhao Guiyuan from Yunlaige (云来阁), and Guan Lemin from Fuxin Wine Hall (福馨酒馆).

Taotao Ju operated predominantly as a teahouse, serving fresh tea and dim sum. For its luxurious furnishing and elegant private rooms, intellectuals and opera performers frequented Taotao Ju. The establishment was also known for its insistence on high end tea and utensils, purchasing teapots and stoves from specific locales. Prices were often out of reach for the general public at the time, with tea prices fetching more than three times over industry average.

Taotao Ju transitioned into a joint venture in 1956, following an industry-wide mobilization in the city. During the Cultural Revolution, the establishment was renamed Dongfenglou (东风楼, Easterly Wind Building). The establishment regained its original name in March 1973.

=== Shewangman (蛇王满) ===
Established by snake hunter Wu Man in 1885, the establishment, named after its founder (literally “Snake King Man”), originally sold spirits and soups enriched or made from snakes. The original store was destroyed in the Second Sino-Japanese War, following the siege of Guangzhou in 1938.

In 1956, Shewangman was transitioned into a joint venture and merged with Guangxinlin (广杏林) and Lianchuntang (联春堂). During the Cultural Revolution, the establishment was renamed Shecanguan (蛇餐馆, Snake Restaurant), a name that remained to the present.

=== Lianxianglou (莲香楼) ===
Originally a pastry shop, Lianxianglou was established by a businessman from Zhaoqing. The establishment was predominantly known for its Chinese-style pastries, especially for its lotus paste mooncakes (hence the name, literally “Lotus Fragrance Hall”). Since the 1940s, Lianxianglou expanded its business and began serving banquets.

The establishment gained international recognition as a mooncake brand since the founding of the People's Republic. In 1955, Lianxianglou became the first exporter of Cantonese-style mooncakes, selling to Hong Kong and Macau. In the 1970s, through business collaborations in Hong Kong, Lianxianglou mooncakes was exported to East and Southeast Asian countries, selling 50,000 to 60,000 boxes a year.

During the Cultural Revolution, in 1970, Lianxianglou was renamed “Dongshenglou (东升楼, Hall of the Rising Sun).” After the renaming, the establishment ceased all dining service, and was repurposed as a pastry factory. The establishment regained its original name in 1973.

Lianxianglou would resume its business operation in fall of 1984, following a renovation project that year. Its mooncake export business grew further in this period, selling to Europe and North America. In 1986, Lianxianglou exported 150,000 boxes of mooncakes, along with other dim sum and pastry varieties, becoming the largest pastry exporter in the city.

=== Meiliquan Ice Shop (美利权冰室) ===
Meiliquan Ice Shop was originally founded by Hong Kong's Meiliquan Sugar Company in 1930, originally located near Taiping Guan. Throughout the 1930s and 1940s, the ice shop sold iced drinks and ice creams with ingredients imported from Hong Kong. Notable items at the time included vanilla ice cream, “cotton” red bean ice cream, and Lingnan iced cocktail. The establishment was particularly popular during Guangzhou's hot summer times.

During the Cultural Revolution, the ice shop began selling congee, stir fries, dog meat, and pan-fried dumplings, a business arrangement that lasted to the present. In the 1980s, the ice shop began selling hot drinks during the winter and spring months.

=== Datong Restaurant (大同酒家) ===
Datong Restaurant was originally known as Guangzhouyuan Restaurant (广州园酒家). The restaurant was initially founded by Japanese businessman 中泽亲礼 during Japanese occupation of Guangzhou. Guangzhouyuan operated poorly and was soon sold to Hong Kong restaurateur Feng Jiansheng in 1942, who renamed the establishment Datong Restaurant. Following Chinese victory of the Second Sino-Japanese War, Datong Restaurant was auctioned as enemy property, and was in turn purchased by Tan Jienan, a notable figure in Guangzhou's teahouse industry.

In the eve of communist takeover of Guangzhou, Tan sold off parts of the business to open Xinguang Restaurant in Hong Kong, leaving only 20 employees with the original Datong Restaurant. In the early days of the People's Republic, Datong only opened for breakfast and brunch and business dwindled. In early 1955, Datong Restaurant became the city's first experimental joint venture establishment, and opened a second location in Beijing the following year.

=== Panxi Restaurant (泮溪酒家) ===
Established in 1947 in Guangzhou's western suburbs, Panxi Restaurant served dishes and snacks made from local delicacies such as water chestnuts and lotus roots. In 1958, the central government funded Panxi's renovation and expansion into a garden-style restaurant, and the restaurant resumed operation in 1960.

Since the 1960s, Panxi Restaurant became a venue for official receptions. Notable visitors include Vietnamese leader Ho Chi-Minh, British Prime Minister Edward Heath, Australian Prime Minister Malcolm Fraser, Singaporean Premier Lee Kuan-Yew, as well as high-ranking Chinese Zhu De, Li Xiannian, He Long, Chen Yi, and Ye Jianying.

Many chefs at Panxi Restaurant also became professional culinary instructors. Since the 1960s, Panxi Restaurant sent envoys to foreign countries such Vietnam, Japan, Myanmar, Seychelles, and Tanzania, and trained chefs there. They also trained almost a thousand Cantonese-style banquet and dim sum chefs in other provinces.

In 1971, Panxi Restaurant was briefly re-named to Friendship Restaurant (a name viewed as more politically appropriate), but then changed back to its original name when foreign dignitaries expressed confusion as to why they had not been taken to the famous Panxi restaurant.

=== Nanyuan Restaurant (南园酒家) ===
One of Guangzhou's garden-style restaurants, Nanyuan Restaurant began construction in 1958, and business operations commenced in July 1963. The restaurant takes up a 10,000 square meters area, 4,500 square meters of which were dedicated to gardens and water features. Situated in the three restaurant buildings are 1,200 seats, with individual banquet halls decorated lavishly with calligraphy and traditional style painting. Serving both tea and banquets, Nanyuan Restaurant provided both indoor and outdoor dining, with the latter dedicated to tea drinking and dim sum periods.

== Notable Items ==
As a historical port and a provincial capital, Guangzhou aggregated ingredients and cooking methods from within imperial and state territories, as well as overseas. Local specialties from surrounding regions and ethnicity also enriched Guangzhou's culinary culture, as the Pearl River Delta localities increasingly engaged with local and long-distance commerce. Since Yuan and Ming times, Guangzhou foodways came under influence from the Chaozhou and Hakka culinary practices, incorporating techniques and amassing collections of frequently used ingredients. By Qing times, local specialties from surrounding commercialized localities such as Foshan and Shunde county, as well as Western-style cooking since the Opium Wars aggregated in Guangzhou's restaurant scene. With its flourishing restaurant industry since Qing times, Guangzhou became a locality where patrons could enjoy Cantonese cuisine and other culinary styles alike.

Items served in Guangzhou are often attached to specific restaurants as the latter's zhaopai (招牌, plaques of notoriety, signature dishes), pertaining to a myriad of local foodways from around the country and the world.

=== Magistrate’s Chicken (太爷鸡) ===
Legend has it that a retired county magistrate in late Qing took up cooking, selling meals revolving around chicken in a stall. His chicken became known for its fragrance and seasoning, and gained notoriety as the Magistrate's Chicken. His recipe entered various banquet halls and teahouses. In the Republican period, Magistrate's Chicken became signature dishes at various major establishments in the city, such as the Liuguo (六国, Six Nations) Restaurant and the Dasanyuan (大三元) Restaurant. The chicken is first cooked in a brine, and then smoked in a mix of stir-fried tea leaves and sugar. After the chicken cools briefly, it was then cut and dressed with a honey brine.

The dish was renamed as Tea Fragrance Chicken (茶香鸡) during the Cultural Revolution, as the Food and Drinks Company condemned the dish's as “feudalist, capitalist, and revisionist (封、资、修).” In present time, Tea Fragrance Chicken is synonymous to Magistrate's Chicken.

=== Jiu’s Roadside Chicken (九记路边鸡) ===
First introduced in the 1930s by Tan Yi at his Jiuji Dai Pai Dong (九记大排档), a congee and chicken eatery, the initially nameless dish quickly gained popularity among Yue Opera singers. As Tan requested the singers to name his popular dish, the singers named it “Roadside Chicken (路边鸡),” for the Dai Pai Dong's patrons often squatted by the roadside as they ate the chicken. Jiu's Dai Pai Dong went out of business in the 1960s, only to be resurrected by Tan Yi's grandson Tan Ruijian at its original location in 1980.

=== Qing Ping Chicken (清平鸡) ===
Originally created by Guangzhou's Qingping Restaurant (清平酒家) in 1965. The recipe calls for young chicken from Qingyuan and Conghua County, which are poached in a salt brine and chilled in the cooking liquid. Known for its smooth and firm skins and fragrant-to-the-bone seasoning, the dish quickly gained public acclaim. The dish briefly disappeared from the general public during the Cultural Revolution due to ingredient shortage, only to reappear in 1983 with improved recipe and ingredient standards. By 1987, the Qingping Restaurant opened a second location, the two locations made record sales of 5,080 chicken per day that year.

=== Soup Poached Bass (上汤浸鲈鱼) ===
Originally described in a Qing cookbook, the recipe originated from the former Shunde County. The recipe calls for a bass of 500 – 700 grams of weight, poached in a 70 – 85 °C stock until half cooked, and then cooled with the stock. After which, the bass is once again put into hot stock until fully cooked. The bass is then plated, dressed with soy sauce, ground pepper, and peanut oil, and finally garnished with sesame.

=== Shrimp Dumplings (虾饺) ===
Originally created in Wufengxiang (五凤乡) in 1920s – a locality in Guangzhou's southern suburbs – the dim sum quickly gained popularity in the urban center, and became a staple item in teahouses. The original recipe called for relatively thick skins made of wheat starch, as opposed to the exceedingly thin skins found in present-day recipes. In the 1960s, dim sum chef Luo Kun standardized the dumpling's shape, which resembled a white bunny – the dim sum dish is therefore also known as White Bunny Dumplings (白兔饺).

=== Cantonese Style Mooncakes (广式月饼) ===
This style of mooncakes is prevalent in Guangdong, Hainan, and Guangxi provinces, and could often be found in regions with significant Chinese populations. Cantonese style mooncakes are known for their delicate production and diverse varieties, and has been exported in an official capacity since the 1950s, and export expanded ever after. Lianxianglou (莲香楼), under state directives, became one of the most notable and prolific mooncake producers and exporters in the 1950s – 1980s.

Cantonese style mooncakes represent one of the most recognizable variants of Chinese mooncakes today. Cantonese style mooncakes are often made with a sweet pastry and often come in different patterns on the outside. Fillings can be sweet, savory, or a combination of both, with the most famous filling being lotus paste. This style of mooncakes could also be found with bean paste, candied nuts, ham, salted duck eggs, and even seafood fillings made from dried shark fins and scallions.

=== Dechang Fried Savory Pancakes (德昌咸煎饼) ===
Originally developed by Dechang Teahouse's (德昌茶楼) dim sum chef Tan Zu, this affordable fried pancake made from oiled pastry, sugar, fermented bean curd, and sesame quickly gained popularity among the teahouse's patrons. In 1947, a Vietnamese Chinese who sampled this pancake was so impressed that he sealed a few fresh pancakes in a metal container and shared it with his family back home.

In 1957, Dechang's savory pancakes was ranked number one in the official competition for Guangzhou's famous dishes and dim sums.
