= Namkhaeng sai =

Thai shaved ice dessert

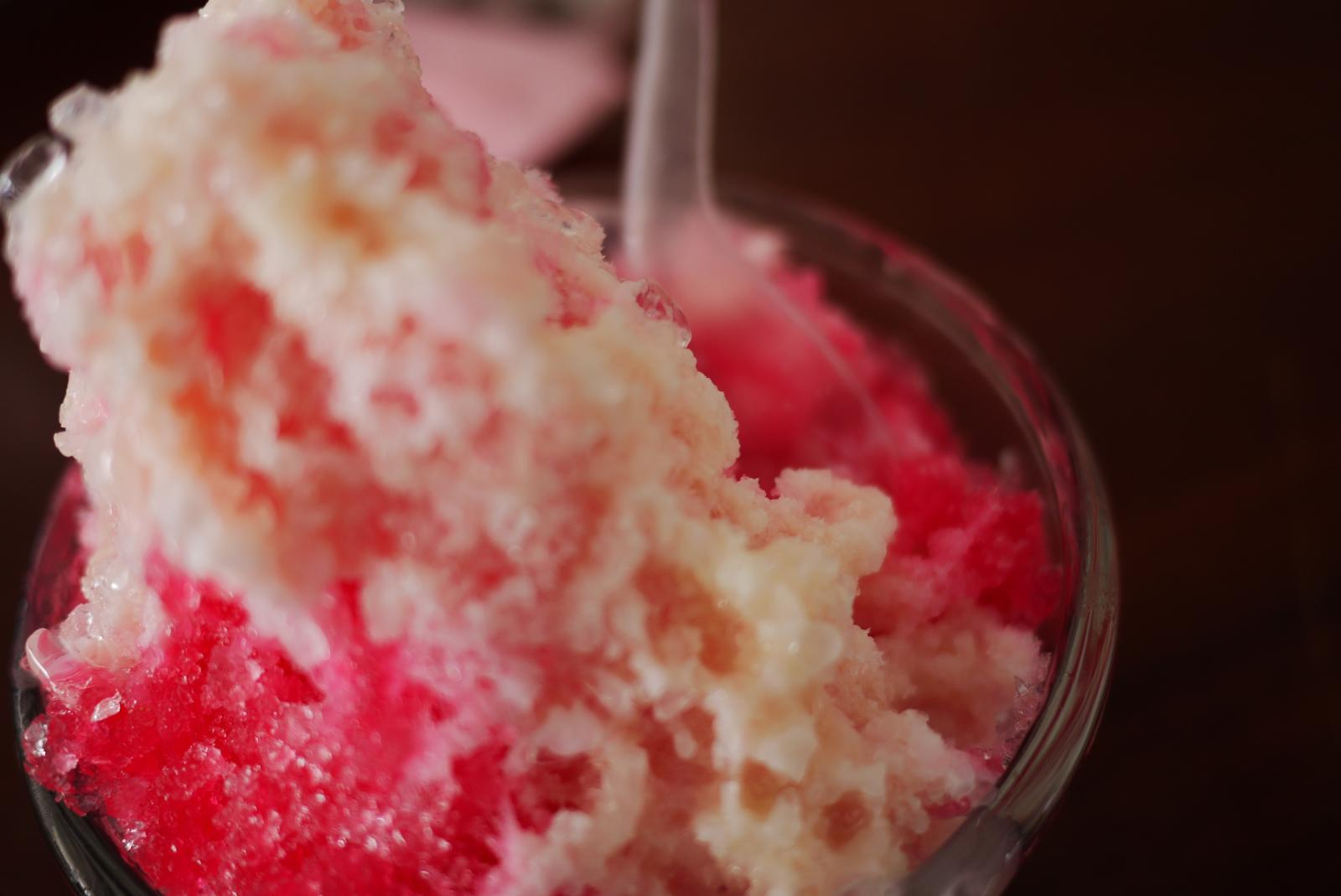
- Alternative names: Wan yen, chamba
- Type: Shaved ice or snow cone
- Course: Dessert
- Place of origin: Thailand
- Serving temperature: Cold
- Main ingredients: Ice, toppings
- Variations: Pang yen (namkhaeng sai with bread), ice-cream namkhaeng sai

Namkhaeng sai (Thai: น้ำแข็งไส, pronounced [námkʰɛ̌ŋ sǎj]; lit. 'shaved ice'), also known as wan yen (หวานเย็น [wǎːn jēn]) or chamba (จ้ำบ๊ะ [t͡ɕâmbá]), is a Thai shaved ice or snow cone dessert. It is simply shaved ice in a bowl, poured on top with sweet syrup and condensed milk.

Other desserts such as sarim, thapthim krop, and lot chong are partially similar to namkhaeng sai with different ingredients. Many desserts from other countries like bingsu and kakikori share characteristics with namkhaeng sai.

== History ==
During the reign of King Rama IV (Mongkut) of Siam, ice was imported, leading to the construction of the first ice factory and consequently enabling the invention of namkhaeng sai. Ice was sent from Singapore, packaged inside a wooden crate, and transported by water on the steamboat named Chao Phrayam. Chao Phraya Phisonsombatboribun (Yim Bisalayaputra), titled Phra Phasisombatboribun, issued the ice order which was considered astonishing at that time.

In 1905, the first ice factory in Thailand was established by Phraya Bhakdi Noraset (Lert Sreshthaputra) at Saphan Lek, Charoen Krung Road. It was named "Siam Ice Factory"; people also called it "Nai Lert Ice Factory" which later on spread to suburbs around Bangkok. Ice was then adapted for use in desserts such as lot chong, Thai cantaloupe cake, sarim, thapthim krop, taro, and namkhaeng sai. First namkhaeng sai originated from the Chinese in Phetchaburi province, combining shaved ice with pathongko and red syrup. Later in 1947, condensed milk was very popular and became one of the ingredients poured on top to flavor namkhaeng sai, which then was called chamba. There are two reasons for its name, first is that namkhaeng sai's shape is similar to women's bosom and apparel color of chamba erotic dancer. The other reason is the distortion of the Teochew Chinese word chamba for its vague pronunciation.

Nowadays, chamba is modified to have diverse ingredients and make it more savory and valuable. Many restaurants use bread in namkhaeng sai but some may use cheesecakes or brownies. Additionally, not only has red syrup been used but also juice, tea, coffee, chocolate powder, or milk. Decorated with toppings such as fresh fruits, candied fruits, grain, jelly, crackers, cereal, and others according to each restaurant's idea. The dessert can easily be found in shopping malls, local markets, or street stalls. It is still one of the most popular cool-down desserts for everyone to date.

== Appearance ==
Namkhaeng sai is by its meaning just ice getting shaved off by shaved ice machine or shaved ice table becoming ice flakes and piled up to make the shape of an ice mountain. This is the main part of the dessert namkhaeng sai. Next is putting the ice flakes into a container, usually a bowl or a cup in some shops, to prepare it for dressing with syrup and toppings. We then pour the syrup of choice on it to create different main flavors, some examples of these syrups are red syrup and condensed milk. The product we have right now is essentially a completed simplest form of namkhaeng sai and is ready to eat. However, to give it more textures and add variety to one’s preferences, nowadays shops always have choices for toppings to choose from; cereal, bread, and sticky rice are such toppings. After adding these to the bowl it is now ready to eat.

The namkhaeng sai mentioned above is sold at street stalls or small shops. In restaurants, namkhaeng sai may have its preset ingredients which come on different menus. Some of them also became signature dishes or portray the shop’s intentions and motivations.

== Preparations ==
=== Ingredients ===
Namkhaeng sai aside from signature menus in restaurants don't have a specific set of ingredients and is usually selectable from the things available at the time of ordering. Customers can choose several ingredients, excluding syrups and condensed milk, up to 4-5 to put in their namkhaeng sai bowl. The ingredients commonly found to be used in namkhaeng sai are listed below.

Sauce	Toppings	
Syrup; Syrup; Condensed milk; Milk; Juice; Coffee; Tea	Bread; Grass jelly; Thapthim krop^{1}; Sarim^{2}; Sticky rice; Coconut jelly; Cereal; Cane sugar; Cocoa powder; Chocolate bar; Chocolate powder; Gingko	Tea powder; Rainbow sprinkles; Brownie; Cheesecake; Oreo; Taro; Fresh fruits; Candied fruits; Grain; Crackers; Biscuit stick; Lot chong^{3}

==== Notes on ingredients ====
1. Thapthim krop is a chestnut fully covered with red-colored flour, also used in another dessert named thapthim krop.
2. Sarim is a colored cellophane noodle, also used in another dessert named sarim.
3. Lot chong is a short green drop of rice used in the dessert lot chong which has the international name cendol.

=== Instructions ===
1. Shave ice blocks into flakes using a shaved ice table or ice machine.
2. Cut the toppings into bite-sized pieces.
3. Pour the sauce and finish.

== Varieties ==
Some other desserts are similar to namkhaeng sai. Some desserts are namkhaeng sai but in different countries with adding extra ingredients. Moreover, some desserts use ice as a base like namkhaeng sai.

=== Other desserts ===
These are other desserts that have ice as the base ingredient. Here are some examples of Thai dessert variants:

1. Granita
2. Thapthim krop (Shaved ice mixed with boiled water chestnut with red flour, coconut milk)
3. Sarim (Thin threads of noodles made from green bean flour poured with coconut milk)
4. Lot chong (cendol)
5. Som chun (A lychee in syrup that is flavored with bitter orange)
6. Mi yen (Noodles in shaved ice with syrup)
7. Man dueai thua (Coconut milk pour on shaved ice mixed with sweet potatoes, job's tear, red bean, and pineapple juice)
8. O-aew (Red sweet syrup poured on shaved ice mixed with clear grass jelly and red bean)
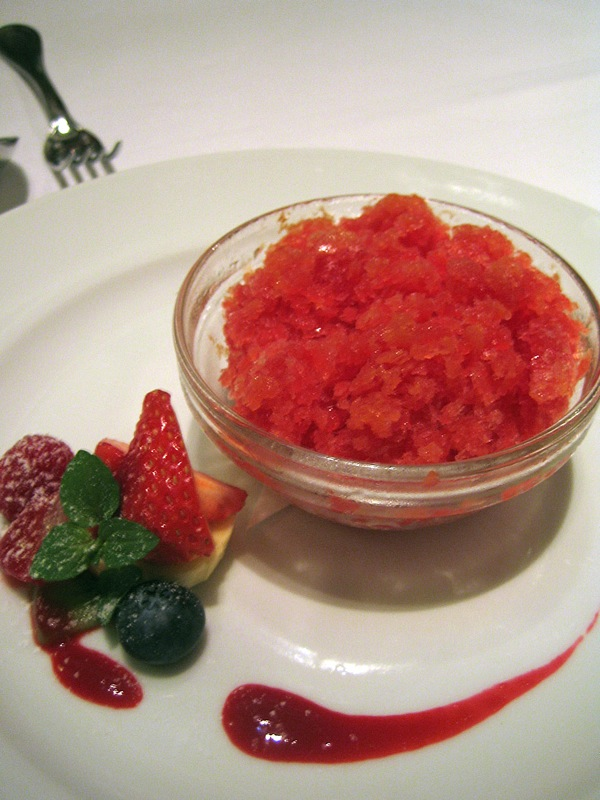
Granita

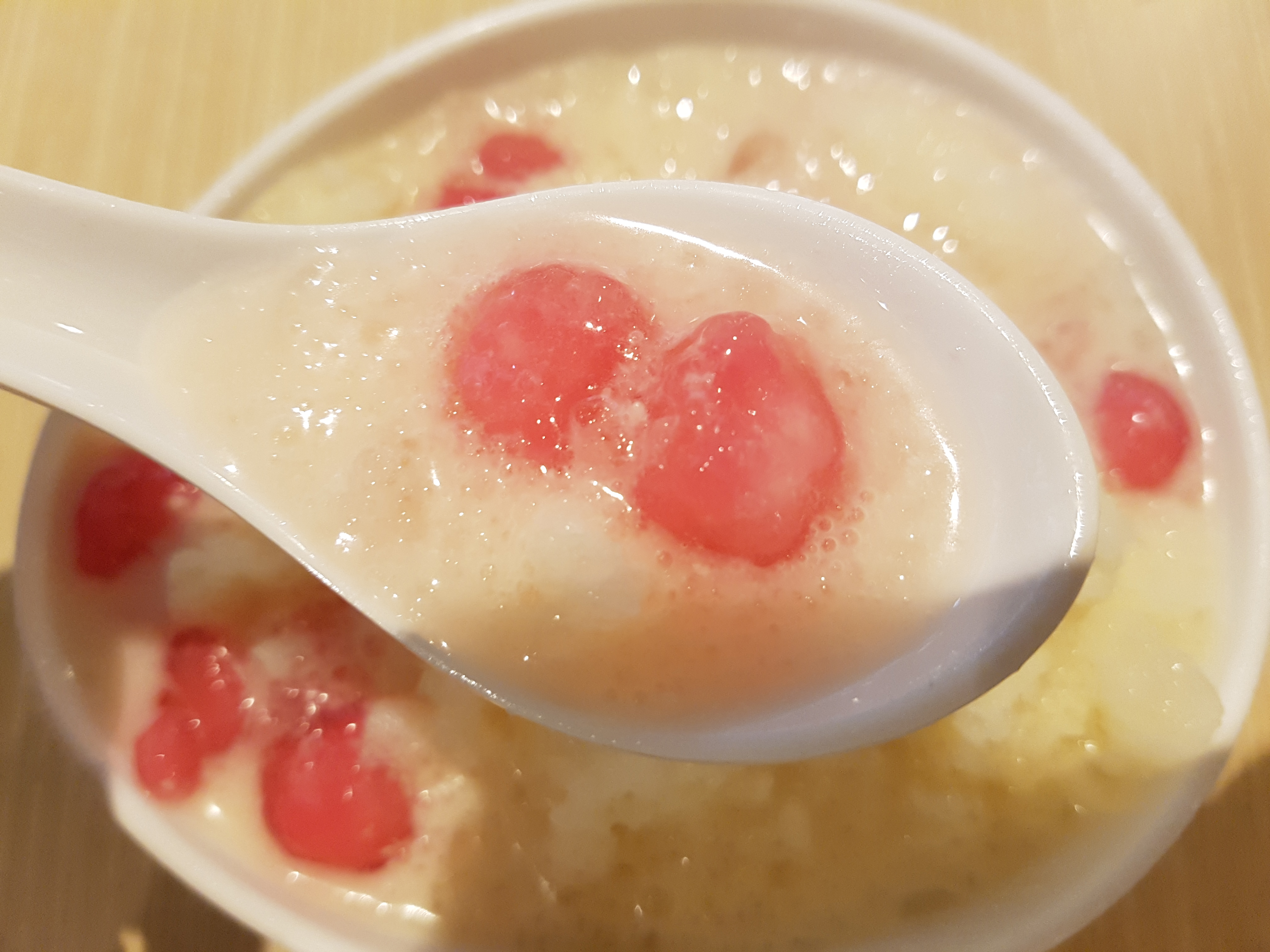
Thapthim krop

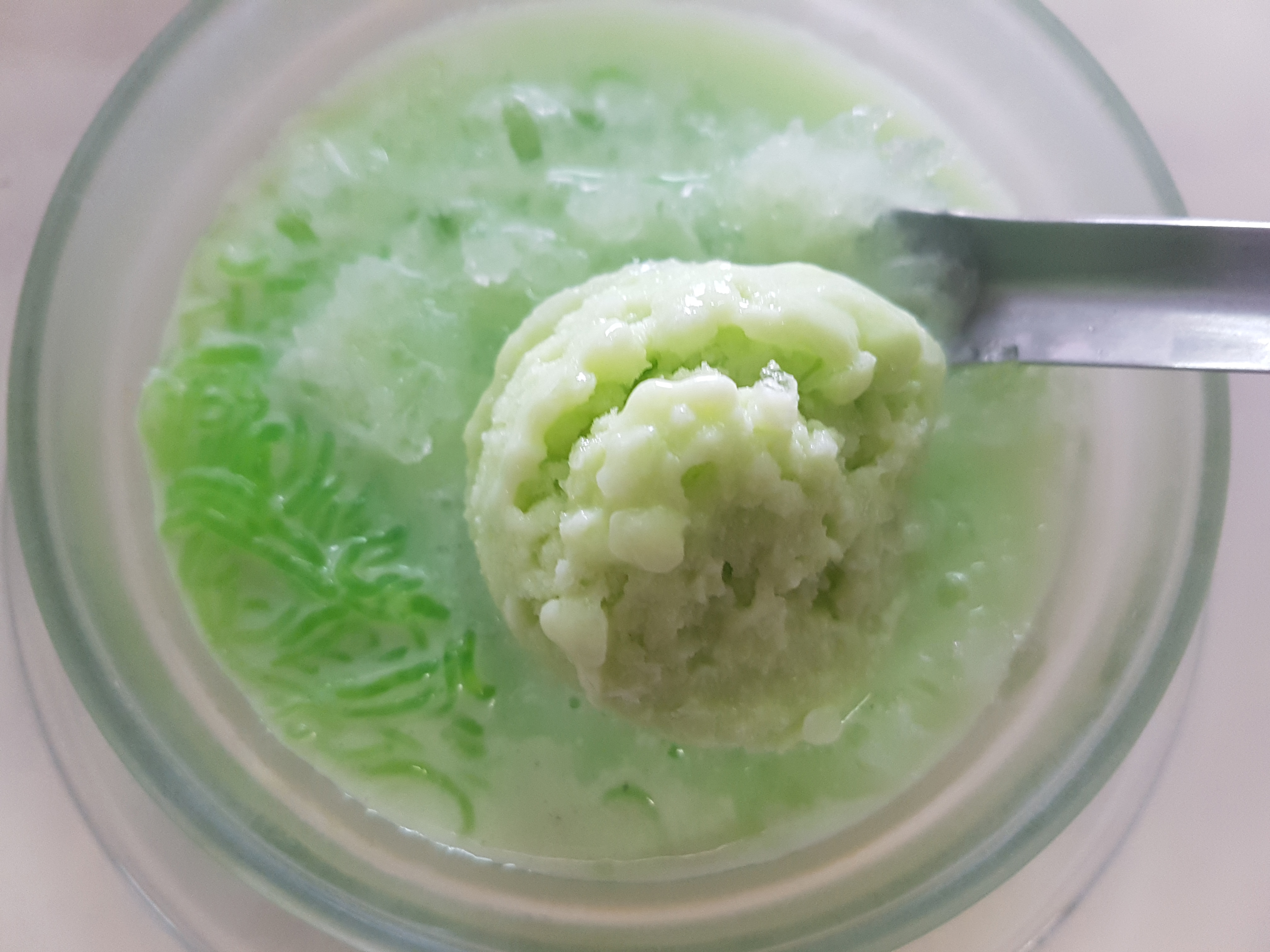
Sarim

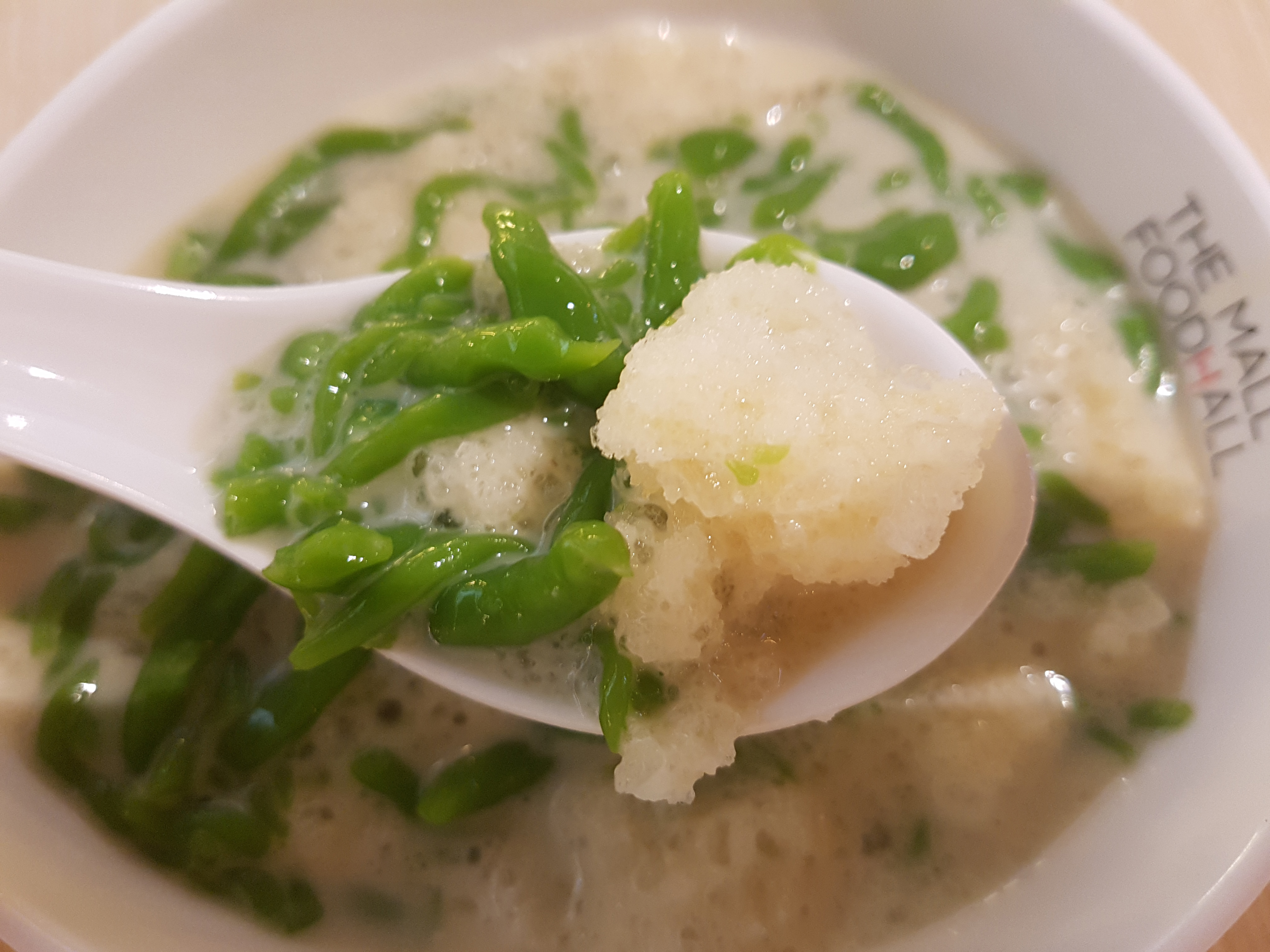
Lot chong

=== Other countries ===
Other countries have desserts that are similar to namkhaeng sai. For example:

Japan: Kakigori

Kakigori is a Japanese shaved ice that ranges from an ice with fruit syrup refresher until a well-refined topped dessert with condensed milk, azuki bean and dango mochi.

Taiwan: Tshuah-Ping

Tshuah-Ping, tsua Bing or baobing, is a Taiwanese shaved ice that is celebrated for juicy toppings. The toppings could be sugar water, condensed milk or seasonal fruit.

There is a classic one, xuehua bing, where the shaved ice is based from frozen milk, mung beans and grass jelly.

South Korean: Bingsu

Bingsu or bingsoo, is a Korean shaved ice that is also popular in Thailand. The differences between bingsu and kakigori are the base and toppings. Bingsu uses milk to create shaved ice but kakigori uses water. The toppings of bingsu typically offer a chunky topping such as popping boba, chopped boba and more.

Philippines: Halo-halo

There are many ice desserts in the Philippines but the most famous is halo-halo. Halo-halo, or mix-mix translated to English, is a Filipino shaved ice that is iconically served in clear tall glass which shows every layer and texture .

India: Ice gola

Ice gola is an Indian shaved ice that is ultimately portable for street dessert. It’s a simple shaved ice covered with sugar syrup served on a stick similar to shaved ice in the United States. It has several names such as gola, baraf gola, chuski, ice lolly, Mumbai’s Slurpee

Indonesia: Es campur

Es campur, Mixed ice translated to English, is an Indonesian shaved ice that similar to Bingsu or Halo halo in its elaborate toppings

Malaysia, Brunei, Singapore: Ais Kacang

Turkey: Bici bici

Bici bici has starch and rose water as a special ingredient. Starch mixing with water is used as a base for shaved ice and rose water for flavoring. The top of bici bici is sprinkled with sugar.

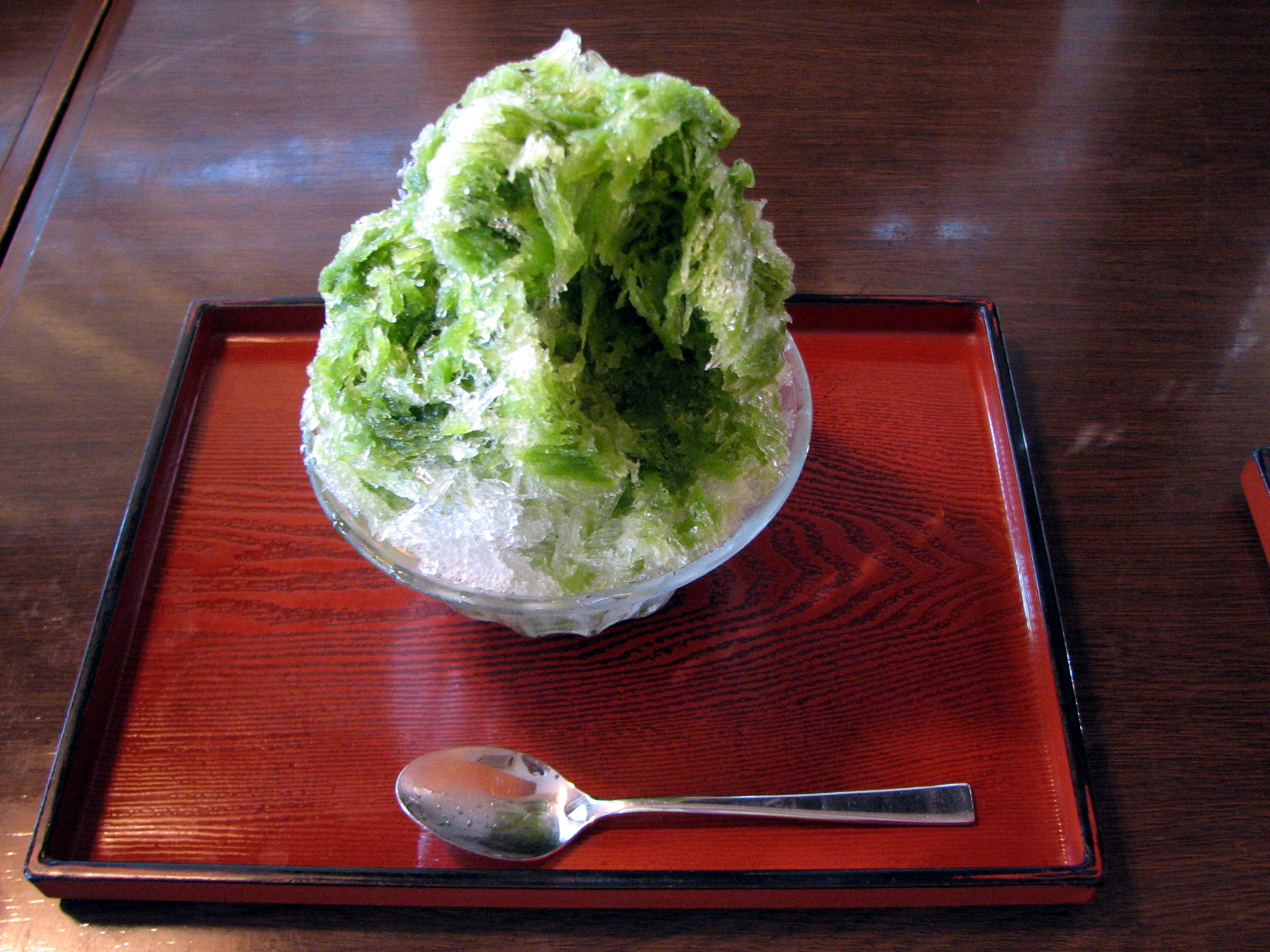
Kakigori - Japan

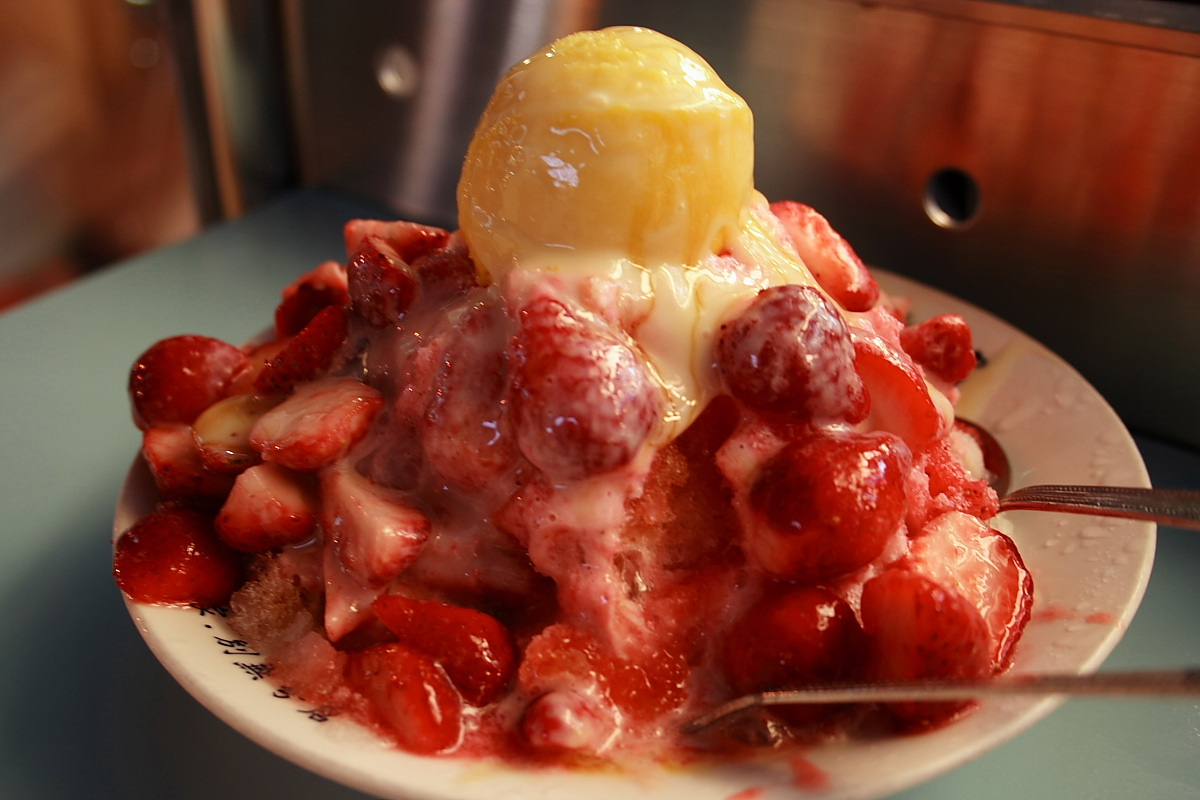
Tshuah-ping - Taiwan

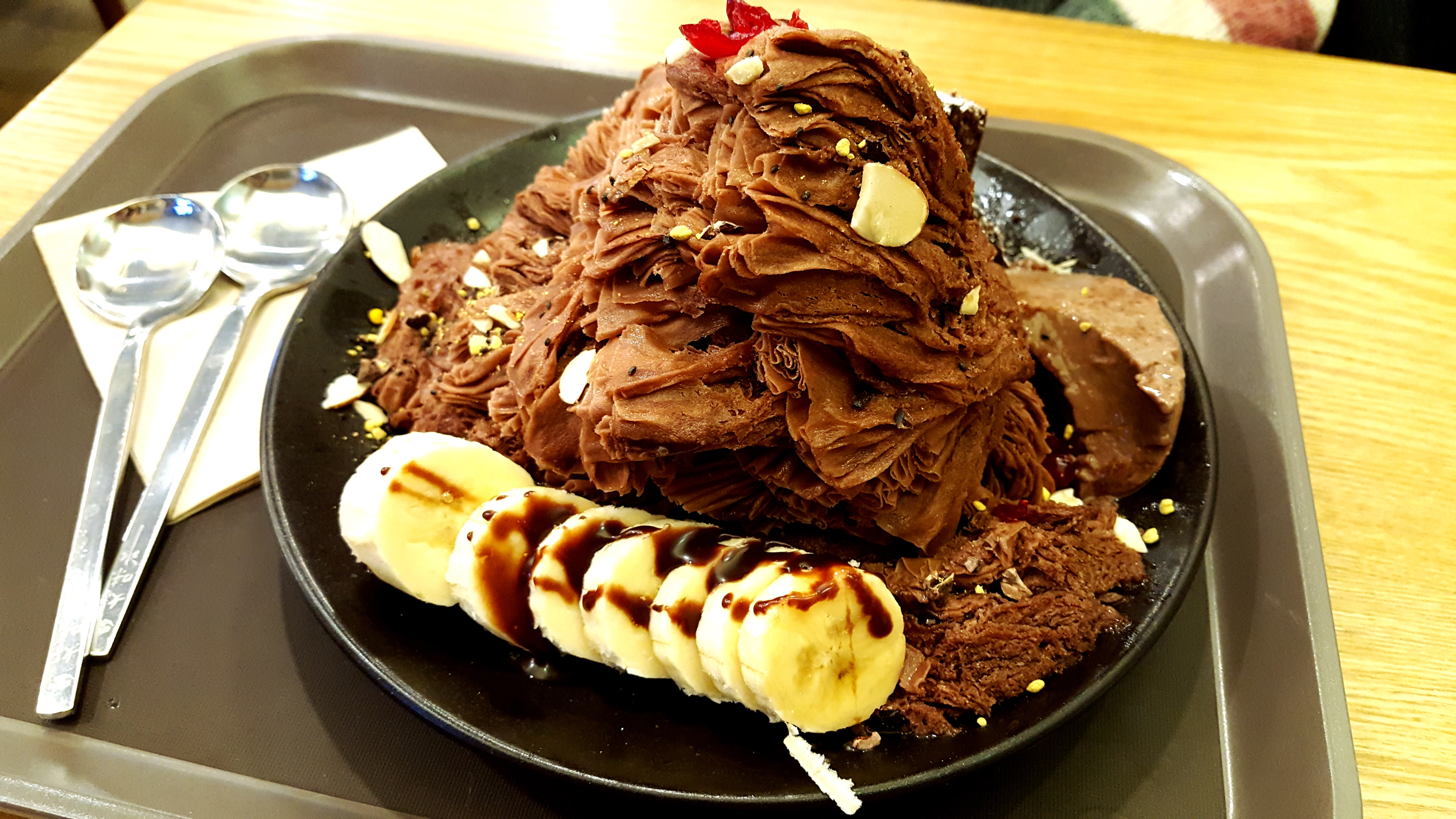
Bingsu - Korea

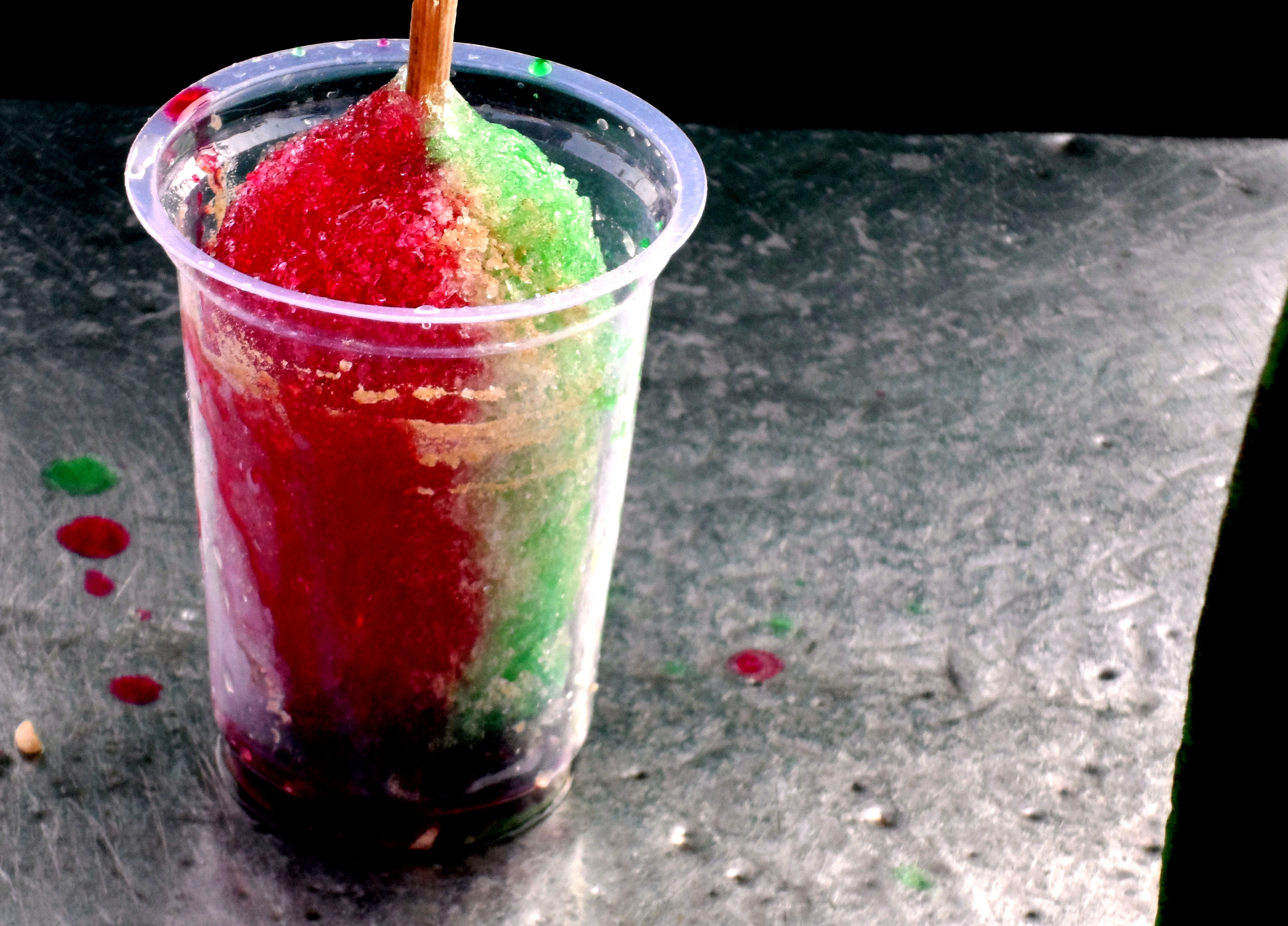
Ice gola - India

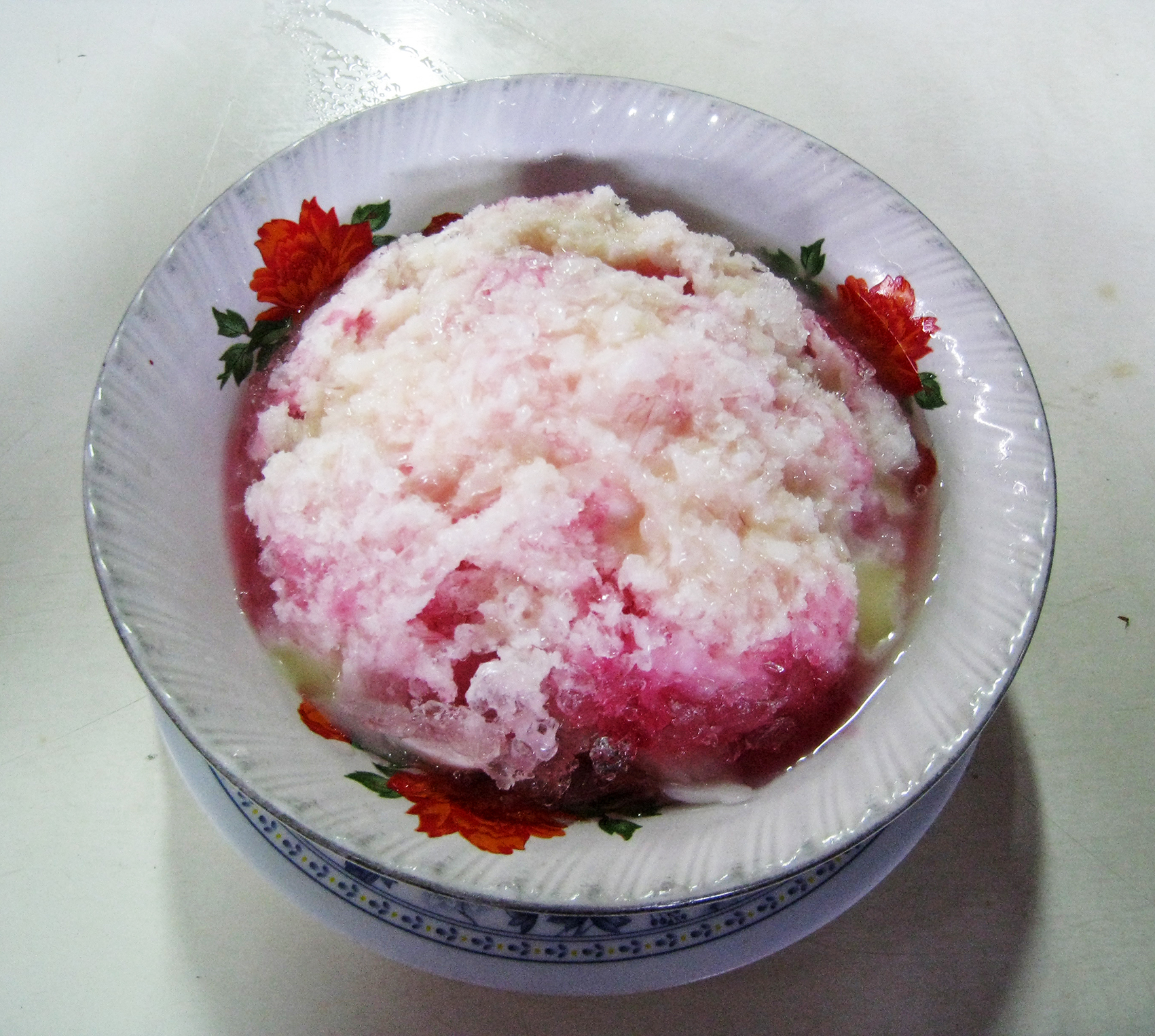
Es campur - Indonesia

== Cultural references ==
In Thailand, namkhaeng sai perfectly correlates to how people perceive the weather, eating behavior, street food culture, childhood beliefs and lifestyle, or different opinions on the topic between generations.

=== Weather and temperature ===
Namkhaeng sai is said to be one of the desserts of choice to suppress smell from food and also to quench one’s thirst. Aligning with Thailand’s all-year-long hot weather, it is perfect for relieving the situation. In the recent past, in country areas or streets in cities, children who went home from school usually stopped by small shops selling ice cream or shaved ice to cool the heat off.

=== Performance ===
For namkhaeng sai, the name itself was once chamba, related to shows with the same name, "chamba erotic dancing". This show was very popular in the 1950s and is often held during temple fairs, where adults gather and watch the dance. The show is straightforward, female dancers will wear flashy, revealing clothes and dance on the stage. During the show, movements primarily involve flashing their genitals and shaking their breasts left and right to arouse audiences.

When vendors sell namkhaeng sai in these fairs where there is a chamba show, people who buy namkhaeng sai would relate its bulging shape to the dancers’ bosom. Red-colored syrup poured on top adds to the imagination as it resembles a flashy dress color worn by dancers. Furthermore, the action of “sprinkling” milk sounds and looks close to “shaking”, adding yet another naughty thought to relate namkhaeng sai with the chamba dance.

Nowadays, chamba cannot be found anywhere as these shows gradually lose their popularity over time, and thus the relation of the name "chamba" with namkhaeng sai is less used. Only a small number of people, presumably at the very least middle-aged and above, still remember this show and how come it is linked with the namkhaeng sai dessert.

== Notable shops ==
Namkhaeng sai, although originated as street food and is commonly seen sold on roadsides or near communities in mobile stalls, is also sold in dedicated cafés which have their uniqueness and possess evident qualities as proper dessert restaurants. These stores would serve namkhaeng sai in multiple variants aside from its original form, notably Bingsu, providing customers with choices they preferred.

=== Sai sai ===
Saisai is a namkhaeng sai store using ingredients like vegetables, fruits, and local commodities to make namkhaeng sai toppings. Examples are 3-species pumpkins with Sago, Dahlia with fried onion, or Krill with Palm flower syrup. The café uses out-of-norm ingredients to make their servings but is made easy for people to eat despite their unfamiliarity. The place claimed that introducing these new tastes to people will also help farmers generate more income.

"Nature just got tastier" is the slogan of this place due to the founders’ intentions to promote local natural products by using them in their namkhaeng sai menus.

=== Lukkaithong ===
Lukkaithong, in the Emquartier shopping mall, was originally a restaurant with a Michelin guide guaranteeing its quality. Owners of Lukkaithong, Sangnarong Montriwat, and Kanchana Tathiyakul, thought of creating a signature dessert for their restaurant. They chose Thai tea to be the base for the dessert because it is one of the most popular beverages they knew. namkhaeng sai, shaved ice, was chosen to be that dessert due to their personal experience of enjoying it as a child to beat the heat, and easiness to eat and share with other people. So they combined Thai tea and namkhaeng sai, then through trial and error they arrived at the present menu's pang cha.

The two creators said that the idea of combining Thai tea with Namkhaneg Sai to make Pang Cha is not difficult to think up, but is hard to maintain consistency due to the nature of tea leaves differing in each season which affects taste and richness. So they had to adjust the recipe for each season to get the tea they wanted and set up the right combinations of fresh milk and condensed milk to make the ideal texture and consistency for the menu.

Pang Cha was originally just Thai tea shaved ice with bread. Toppings were then added, and three types of tapioca pearls: glass pearls for crunchiness, Thai tea pearls for color and aroma, and black tea pearls for texture and sweetness. White bread, almond slices, and whipped cream are also added as toppings. Shaved ice part of this menu is in the form of a fluffy mountain from piled up thin ice floss.

== See also ==
- Shaved ice § Regions, for similar shaved ice variations around the world
- Ais kacang – Malaysian shaved ice
- Bingsu – Korean shaved ice
- Es campur – Indonesian shaved ice
- Es teler – Indonesian shaved ice
- Halo-halo – Filipino shaved ice
- Hawaiian shave ice – Hawaiian shaved ice
- Kakigōri – Japanese shaved ice
- O-aew – another Thai shaved ice, albeit with different ingredients
- Piragua – Puerto Rican shaved ice
- Tshuah-ping – Taiwanese shaved ice
