= White boiled shrimp =

Cantonese shrimp dish

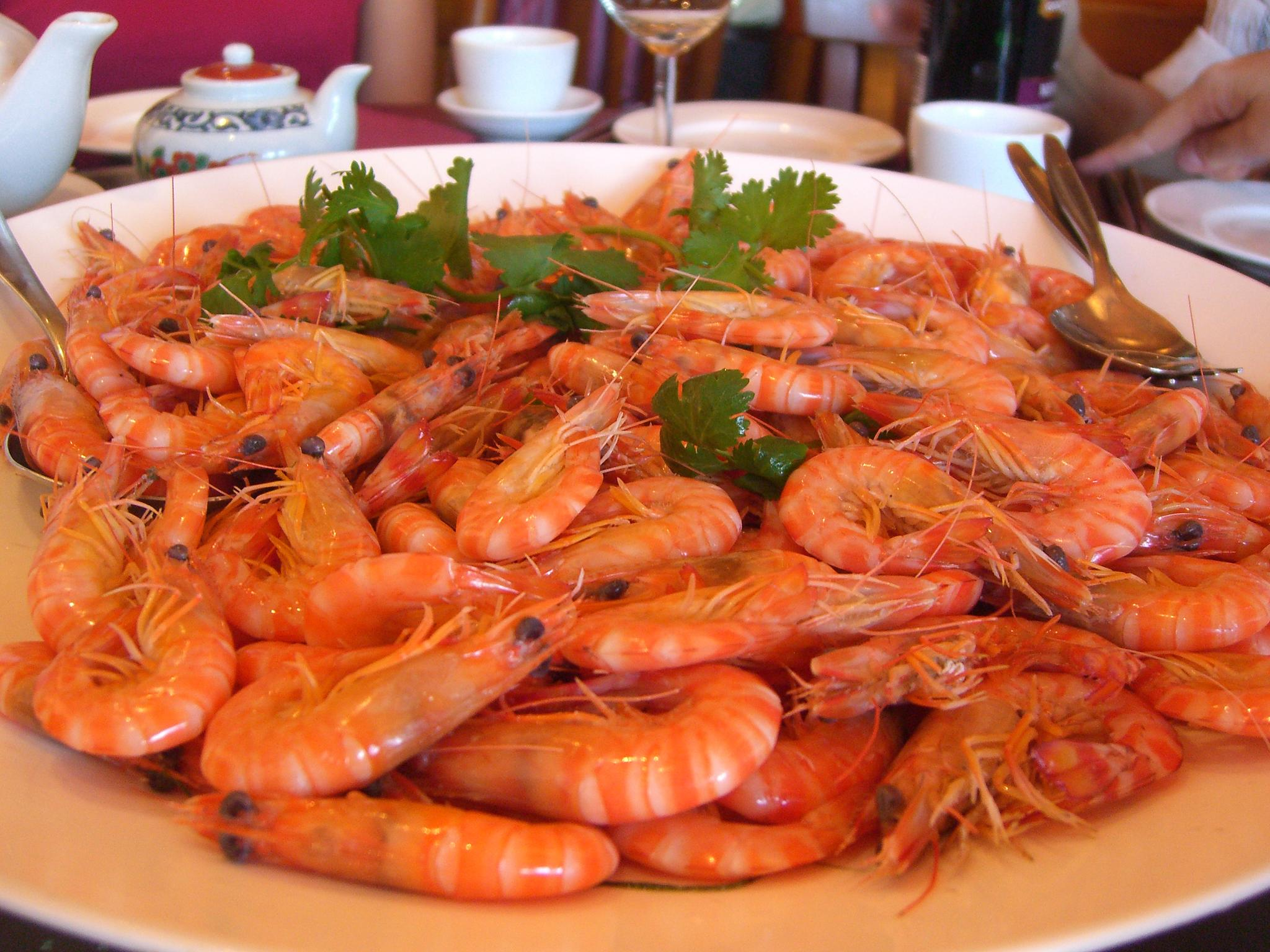
- Course: Main dishes
- Place of origin: China
- Main ingredients: shrimp

White boiled shrimp
- Traditional Chinese: 白灼蝦
- Simplified Chinese: 白灼虾
Transcriptions
Standard Mandarin
- Hanyu Pinyin: bai2 zhuo2 xia1
Yue: Cantonese
- Jyutping: baak6 coek3 haa1

White boiled shrimp (simplified Chinese: 白灼虾; traditional Chinese: 白灼蝦) is a variety of night dish in Cantonese cuisine. The dish is made with shrimp in boiling (灼) hot water, and served with the shells. The shrimp is then eaten with soy sauce. When finished, people wash their hands in a bowl of warm tea and lemon.
