= Tshuah-ping =

Shaved ice dessert

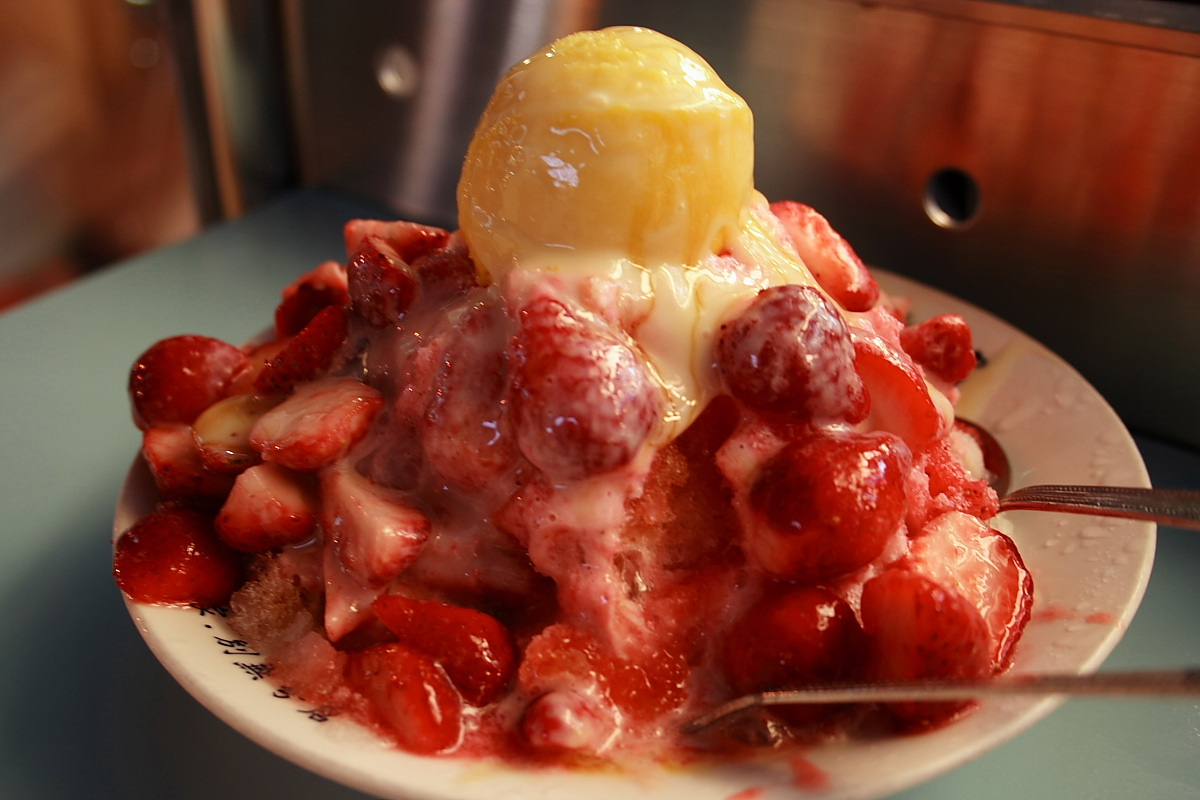
- A plate of Tshuah-ping with strawberries and condensed milk
- Type: Shaved ice
- Place of origin: Taiwan
- Region or state: East and Southeast Asia
- Main ingredients: Shaved ice, syrup, fruit

Tshuah-ping (Taiwanese Hokkien: 礤冰 or 剉冰; Tâi-lô: tshuah-ping) or Tsua bing, also known as Baobing (Chinese: 刨冰; pinyin: bàobīng) in Mandarin, is a shaved ice dessert introduced to Taiwan under Japanese rule, and then spread from Taiwan to Greater China and countries with large regional Overseas Chinese populations such as Malaysia and Singapore. It is especially popular in Taiwan where the dish has a variation called xuehua bing (雪花冰), in which the ice is not made out of water but milk.

The dessert consists of a large mound of ice shavings with various toppings on top. A wide variety of toppings exist, but the most common ones include sugar water, condensed milk, adzuki beans, mung beans, and tapioca balls. Fruit are also used according to the season. Mango baobing is typically only available in the summer, while strawberry baobing is available in the winter. Traditionally, these shavings were created by hand using a large mallet to crush ice or a blade to shave ice. Now, most stores use machines, which result in finer, thinner ice shavings.

== See also ==
- Taiwanese cuisine
- List of Taiwanese desserts and snacks
- Shaved ice § Regions, for similar shaved ice variations around the world.
  - Kakigōri: Japanese shaved ice
  - Bingsu: Korean shaved ice
  - Halo-halo: Filipino shaved ice
  - Es campur and Es teler: Indonesian shaved ice
  - Namkhaeng sai and O-aew: Thai shaved ice
  - Ais Kacang (ABC): Malaysian shaved ice
  - Grattachecca: Italian shaved ice popular in Rome.
  - Hawaiian shave ice: Hawaiian shaved ice
