= List of Chinese dishes =

This is a list of dishes in Chinese cuisine.

== Dishes by type ==
=== Grain-based dishes ===
==== Noodles ====
English	Image	Traditional Chinese	Simplified Chinese	Pinyin	Notes
Chinese noodles		麵條	面条	miàntiáo	plain noodles; an essential ingredient and staple in Chinese cuisine
Chow mein		炒麵	炒面	chǎomiàn	stir-fried noodles
Noodle soup		湯麵	汤面	tāngmiàn	noodles with soup, originated in China
Zhajiangmian		炸醬麵	炸酱面	zhájiàngmiàn	noodles mixed with sauce
Lamian		拉麵	拉面	lāmiàn	Hand-pulled noodles
Liangpi		涼皮	凉皮	liángpí	served cold
Lo mein		撈麵	捞面	lāo miàn	
Biangbiang noodles		𰻞𰻞麵	𰻝𰻝面	biángbiáng miàn	broad noodles, part of Shaanxi cuisine
Sliced puddle		刀削麵	刀削面	dāoxiāo miàn	noodles that are sliced from a big chunk of dough directly into the boiling water
Su-style noodles		蘇式湯麵	苏式汤面	sūshì tāngmiān	
Chongqing noodles		重慶小麵	重庆小面	Chóngqìng xiǎomiàn	
Shacha noodles		沙嗲面	沙茶面	shā chá miàn	
Noodles with tomato egg sauce		番茄炒蛋面	番茄炒蛋面	fān qié chǎo dàn miàn	Similar to Stir-fried tomato with eggs except with the inclusion of noodles.

==== Rice ====
English	Image	Traditional Chinese	Simplified Chinese	Pinyin
White rice		米飯	米饭	mǐfàn
Fried rice		炒飯	炒饭	chǎofàn

=== Pork-based dishes ===
English	Image	Traditional Chinese	Simplified Chinese	Pinyin	Notes
Braised pork belly		紅燒肉	红烧肉	hóngshāoròu	
Braised pork		東坡肉	东坡肉	Dōngpō ròu	
Sweet and sour pork		咕咾肉	咕咾肉	gǔlǎoròu	
Twice cooked pork		回鍋肉	回锅肉	huíguōròu	
Char siu		叉燒	叉烧	chāshāo	Chinese barbecued pork

=== Poultry-based dishes ===
English	Image	Traditional Chinese	Simplified Chinese	Pinyin	Notes
Century egg		皮蛋	皮蛋	pi dan	A famous snack in parts of China
Kung Pao chicken		宮保雞丁	宫保鸡丁	gōngbǎo jīdīng	
Peking Duck		北京烤鴨	北京烤鸭	Běijīng kǎoyā	the trademark dish of Beijing
Soy egg		滷蛋	卤蛋	lǔdàn	hard boiled egg marinated in sweet soy sauce over the course of a few days or hours
Tea egg		茶葉蛋	茶叶蛋	cháyèdàn	
Fujian red wine chicken		福建紅酒雞	福建红酒鸡	hóngzāojī	a traditional dish of northern Fujian cuisine which is made from braising chicken in red yeast rice.
Stir-fried tomato and scrambled eggs		番茄炒蛋	番茄炒蛋	fānqié chǎo dàn	a common dish in China.
Dry pot chicken		鸡爆	干锅鸡	jī bào	

=== Vegetable-based dishes ===
English	Image	Traditional Chinese	Simplified Chinese	Pinyin	Notes
Buddha's delight		羅漢齋	罗汉斋	luóhàn zhāi	a vegetarian dish popular among Buddhists
Pickled vegetables		榨菜	榨菜	jiàngcài	various vegetables or fruits that have been fermented by pickling with salt and brine, or marinated in mixtures based on soy sauce or savory bean pastes

== Dishes by cooking method ==
English	Image	Traditional Chinese	Simplified Chinese	Pinyin	Notes
Double steaming / double boiling		燉	炖	dùn	a Chinese cooking technique to prepare delicate and often expensive ingredients. The food is covered with water and put in a covered ceramic jar, and is then steamed for several hours.
Red cooking		紅燒	红烧	hóngshāo	several different slow-cooked stews characterized by the use of soy sauce and/or caramelised sugar and various ingredients.
Stir frying		炒 / 爆	炒 / 爆	chǎo / bào	two fast Chinese cooking techniques.

=== Dumplings ===
English	Image	Traditional Chinese	Simplified Chinese	Pinyin	Notes
Baozi		包子	包子	bāozi	steamed buns with fillings
Dim sum		點心	点心	diǎnxīn	a staple of Cantonese cuisine
Potsticker		鍋貼	锅贴	guōtiē	fried dumplings
Jiaozi		餃子	饺子	jiǎozi	dumplings
Mantou		饅頭	馒头	mántou	steamed buns
Wonton		餛飩 / 雲吞	馄饨 / 云吞	húntún / yúntūn	sphere-shaped dumplings usually served boiled in broth or deep-fried
Xiaolongbao		小籠包	小笼包	xiǎolóngbāo	soup dumplings, a specialty of Shanghai cuisine
Zongzi		糭子/粽子	粽子	zòngzi	glutinous rice wrapped in bamboo leaves, usually with a savory or sweet filling
Tangyuan		湯圓	汤圆	tāngyuán	glutenous rice balls

=== Pastries ===
English	Image	Traditional Chinese	Simplified Chinese	Pinyin	Notes
Cha siu bao		叉燒包	叉烧包	chāshāobāo	Steamed buns, usually filled with BBQ pork
Cong you bing		蔥油餅	葱油饼	cōngyóubǐng	Scallion pancakes
Mooncake		月餅	月饼	yuèbǐng	Usually eaten during the Mid-Autumn Festival. Sweet pastry with various fillings e.g. lotus paste, red bean paste, mung bean paste. Most have a savoury egg yolk inside.
Sachima		沙琪瑪	沙琪玛	shāqímǎ	A sweet pastry made of sugar and flour
Shaobing		燒餅	烧饼	shāobǐng	A flaky baked or pan-seared dough pastry
Youtiao		油條	油条	yóutiáo	Long strips of deep-fried dough

=== Soups, stews and porridge ===
English	Image	Traditional Chinese	Simplified Chinese	Pinyin	Notes
Congee		粥	粥	zhōu	Chinese rice porridge
Hot and sour soup		酸辣湯	酸辣汤	suānlàtāng	
Hot pot		火鍋	火锅	huǒguō	
Tong sui		糖水	糖水	tángshuǐ	a sweet soup served as dessert in Cantonese cuisine

== Dishes by region ==
=== Anhui ===
English	Image	Traditional Chinese	Simplified Chinese	Pinyin	Notes
Bagongshan Tofu		八公山豆腐	八公山豆腐	bāgōngshān dòufǔ	
Bright Pearl Abalone		明珠酥鮑	明珠酥鲍	míngzhū sūbào	
Caterpillar Fungus Duck		蟲草燉老鴨	虫草炖老鸭	chóngcǎo dùn lǎoyā	
Crab and Fish Stomachs		蟹連魚肚	蟹连鱼肚	xièlián yúdù	
Crab-apple Flower Cake		海棠酥	海棠酥	hǎitángsū	
Dried Pot Tofu		乾鍋素肉	干锅素肉	gānguō sùròu	
Five Colours Fish Cake		五彩魚片	五彩鱼片	wǔcǎi yúpiàn	
Flower Mushroom Frog		花菇田雞	花菇田鸡	huāgū tiánjī	
Steamed Pumpkin Dumplings		南瓜蒸餃	南瓜蒸饺	nánguā zhēngjiǎo	
Fried Tofu Curd Balls		豆腐渣丸子	豆腐渣丸子	dòufǔzhā wánzi	
Fuli Roast Chicken		符離集燒雞	符离集烧鸡	fúlíjí shāojī	
Ginger Duck		姜母鴨	姜母鸭	jiāng mǔyā	
Hay Wrapped Fragrant Ribs		稻香排骨	稻香排骨	dàoxiāng páigǔ	
Jade Rabbit Sea Cucumber		玉兔海參	玉兔海参	yùtù hǎishēn	
Lotus Seed Pod Fish		蓮蓬魚	莲蓬鱼	liánpéng yú	
Phoenix Tail Shrimp		鳳尾蝦排	凤尾虾排	fèngwěi xiāpái	
Potato Croquet		土豆炸餃	土豆炸饺	tǔdòu zhájiǎo	
Silver Fish Fried Egg		銀魚煎蛋	银鱼煎蛋	yínyú jiāndàn	
Soy Braised Mandarin Fish		紅燒臭鱖魚	红烧臭鱖鱼	hóngshāo chòu guìyú	

=== Beijing ===
English	Image	Traditional Chinese	Simplified Chinese	Pinyin	Notes
Peking Duck		北京烤鴨	北京烤鸭	Běijīng kǎoyā	
Zhajiangmian		炸醬麵	炸酱面	zhájiàngmiàn	
Xianbing		餡餅	馅饼	xiànbǐng	
Youtiao		油條	油条	yóutiáo	a deep fried strip of dough

=== Cantonese ===
English	Image	Traditional Chinese	Simplified Chinese	Pinyin	Jyutping	Notes
Braised abalone		燜鮑魚	焖鲍鱼	mèn bàoyú	mun6 baau1 jyu4	
Shaved ice		刨冰	刨冰	páobīng	paau4 bing1	
Beef chow fun		乾炒牛河	干炒牛河	gānchǎo niúhé	gon1 caau2 ngau4 ho4	
Bird's nest soup		燕窩	燕窝	yànwō	jin1 wo1	
Black sesame soup		芝麻糊	芝麻糊	zhīmahú	zi1 maa4 wu4	
Cantonese seafood soup		海皇羹	海皇羹	hǎihuáng gēng	hoi2 wong4 gang1	
Char siu		叉燒	叉烧	chāshāo	caa1 siu1	
Crispy fried chicken		炸子雞	炸子鸡	zházǐjī	zaa3 zi2 gai1	
Duck with taro		陳皮芋頭鴨	陈皮芋头鸭	chénpí yùtóuyā	can4 pei4 wu6 tau4 ngaap3	
Guilinggao		龜苓膏	龟苓膏	guīlínggāo	gwai1 ling4 gou1	
Little pot rice		煲仔飯	煲仔饭	bāozǎifàn	bou1 zai2 faan6	
Red bean soup		紅豆沙	红豆沙	hóngdòushā	hung4 dau6 saa1	
Roast squab		乳鴿	乳鸽	rǔgē	jyu5 gap3	
Roast suckling pig		燒乳豬	烧乳猪	shāo rǔzhū	siu1 jyu5 zyu1	
Sea cucumber		海參	海参	hǎishēn	hoi2 saam1	
Seafood with bird's nest		海鮮雀巢	海鲜雀巢	hǎixiān quècháo	hoi2 sin1 zoek3 caau4	
Shark fin soup		魚翅湯	鱼翅汤	yúchì tāng	jyu4 ci3 tong1	
Siu Yuk		燒肉	烧肉	shāoròu	siu1 juk6	
Snow fungus soup		銀耳湯	银耳汤	yín'ěr tāng	ngan4 ji5 tong1	
Sour spare ribs		生炒排骨	生炒排骨	shēngchǎo páigǔ	saang1 caau2 paai4 gwat1	
Spare ribs soup with watercress and apricot kernels		南北杏西洋菜豬骨湯	南北杏西洋菜猪骨汤	nánběixìng xīyángcài zhūgǔ tāng	naam4 baak1 hang6 sai1 joeng4 coi3 zyu1 gwat1 tong1	
White cut chicken		白切雞	白切鸡	báiqièjī	baak6 cit3 gai1	
Winter melon soup		冬瓜湯	冬瓜汤	dōngguā tāng	dung1 gwaa1 tong1	
Wonton noodles		雲吞麵	云吞面	yúntūnmiàn	wan4 tan1 min6	
Yeung Chow fried rice		揚州炒飯	扬州炒饭	Yángzhōu chǎofàn	Joeng4 zau1 caau2 faan6	
Youtiao		油條	油条	yóutiáo	jau4 tiu4	
Zhaliang		炸兩	炸两	zháliǎng	zaa3 loeng5	

=== Chaozhou ===
English	Image	Traditional Chinese	Simplified Chinese	Pinyin	Notes
Yusheng		魚生	鱼生	yúshēng	
Popiah		薄餅	薄饼	báobǐng	
Hao kuih		鱟粿	鲎粿	hòu guǒ	

=== Fujian ===
English	Image	Traditional Chinese	Simplified Chinese	Pinyin	Pe̍h-ōe-jī	Notes
Buddha jumps over the wall		佛跳牆	佛跳墙	fótiàoqiáng	hu̍t-thiàu-chhiûⁿ	
Fried rice in Fujian style		福建式炒飯	福建式炒饭	Fújiàn shì chǎofàn		
Oyster omelette		蚵仔煎	蚵仔煎	hézǎijiān		
Popiah		薄餅	薄饼	báobǐng	pȯh-piáⁿ	
Yanpi		燕皮	燕皮	yànpí		

=== Guangxi ===
Southern Guangxi cuisine is very similar to Guangdong cuisine. Northern Guangxi cuisine, such as the dishes below, is quite different.

English	Image	Traditional Chinese	Simplified Chinese	Pinyin	Notes
Luosifen		螺蛳粉	螺蛳粉	luósīfěn	Liuzhou noodles
Guilin mifen		桂林米粉	桂林米粉	guìlín mǐfěn	Guilin rice noodles
Ningmeng ya		柠檬鸭	柠檬鸭	níngméng yā	Lemon duck

=== Hainan ===
English	Image	Traditional Chinese	Simplified Chinese	Pinyin	Notes
Hainanese chicken rice		海南雞飯	海南鸡饭	Hǎinán jīfàn	
Wenchang chicken		文昌雞	文昌鸡	Wénchāng jī	

=== Hakka ===
English	Image	Traditional Chinese	Simplified Chinese	Pinyin	Notes
Meigan vegetable		梅乾菜	梅干菜	méigān cài	
Stuffed bitter melon		釀苦瓜	酿苦瓜	niàng kǔguā	
Stuffed tofu		釀豆腐	酿豆腐	niàng dòufǔ	

=== Hunan ===
English	Image	Traditional Chinese	Simplified Chinese	Pinyin	Notes
Changsha stinky tofu		長沙臭豆腐	长沙臭豆腐	chángshā chòu dòufǔ	
Xiangxi bacon		湘西臘肉	湘西腊肉	xiāngxī làròu	
Xiangxi rice tofu		湘西米豆腐	湘西米豆腐	xiāngxī mǐ dòufu	

=== Hubei ===
English	Image	Traditional Chinese	Simplified Chinese	Pinyin	Notes
Hot dry noodles		熱乾麵	热干面	Rè gān miàn	

=== Shandong ===
English	Image	Traditional Chinese	Simplified Chinese	Pinyin	Notes
Youxuan		油旋	油旋	yóuxuán	

=== Sichuan ===
English	Image	Traditional Chinese	Simplified Chinese	Pinyin	Notes
Chongqing spicy deep-fried chicken		重慶辣子雞	重庆辣子鸡	Chóngqìng làzǐjī	
Dandan noodles		擔擔麵	担担面	dàndànmiàn	
Fuqi Feipian		夫妻肺片	夫妻肺片	fūqī fèipiàn	
Sichuan hotpot		四川火鍋	四川火锅	Sìchuān huǒguō	
Kung Pao chicken		宮保雞丁	宫保鸡丁	gōngbǎo jīdīng	
Mapo tofu		麻婆豆腐	麻婆豆腐	mápó dòufǔ	
Shuizhu		水煮	水煮	shuǐzhǔ	
Twice cooked pork		回鍋肉	回锅肉	huíguōròu	
Zhangcha duck		樟茶鴨	樟茶鸭	zhāngchá yā	

=== Yunnan ===
English	Image	Traditional Chinese	Simplified Chinese	Pinyin	Notes
Crossing the bridge noodles		過橋米線	过桥米线	guòqiáo mǐxiàn	

=== Zhejiang ===
English	Image	Traditional Chinese	Simplified Chinese	Pinyin	Notes
Beggar's Chicken		叫化雞	叫化鸡	jiàohuā jī	
Braised Sliced Pork with Preserved Vegetables		干菜燜肉	干菜焖肉	gāncài mènròu	
Cold Chicken Cooked in Wine		糟雞	糟鸡	zāojī	
Dongpo Braised Pork		東坡肉	东坡肉	dōngpō ròu	
Fish Ball in Light Soup		清湯魚圓	清汤鱼圆	qīngtāng yúyuán	
Fried Eel Slices		生爆鱔片	生爆鳝片	shēngbào shànpiàn	
Fried Pigeon with Spiced Salt		椒鹽乳鴿	椒盐乳鸽	jiāoyán rǔgē	
Fried Shrimps with Longjing Tea		龍井蝦仁	龙井虾仁	Lóngjǐng xiārén	
Fried Stuffed Bean Curd Paste		干炸響鈴	干炸响铃	gānzhá xiǎnglíng	
Fried Sweet and Sour Pork		糖醋里脊	糖醋里脊	tángcù lǐji	
Hangzhou-Style Duck Pickled in Soy Sauce		杭州醬鴨	杭州酱鸭	Hángzhōu jiàngyā	
Old Duck Stewed with Bamboo Root and Ham		笋干老鴨煲	笋干老鸭煲	sǔngān lǎoyā bāo	
Red-Stewed Duck		滷鴨	卤鸭	lǔ yā	
Sauteed Broad Beans with Ham		火腿蠶豆	火腿蚕豆	huǒtuǐ cándòu	
Sauteed Shrimps		油爆蝦	油爆虾	yóubào xiā	
Sizzling Rice in Tomato Sauce		番茄鍋巴	番茄锅巴	fānqié guōbā	
Steamed Pork with Rice Flour in Lotus Leaf		荷葉粉蒸肉	荷叶粉蒸肉	héyèfěn zhēngròu	
Stewed Spring Bamboo Shoots		油燜春笋	油焖春笋	yóumèn chūnsǔn	
Stir-Fried Spring Chicken with Chestnuts		栗子炒子雞	栗子炒子鸡	lìzi chǎo zǐjī	
West Lake Fish in Vinegar Sauce		西湖醋魚	西湖醋鱼	xīhú cùyú	

== See also ==
- List of Chinese desserts
- List of Chinese restaurants
- List of Chinese sauces
- List of Chinese soups
- List of restaurants in China
