= Roujiamo =

Chinese street food of meat in flatbread

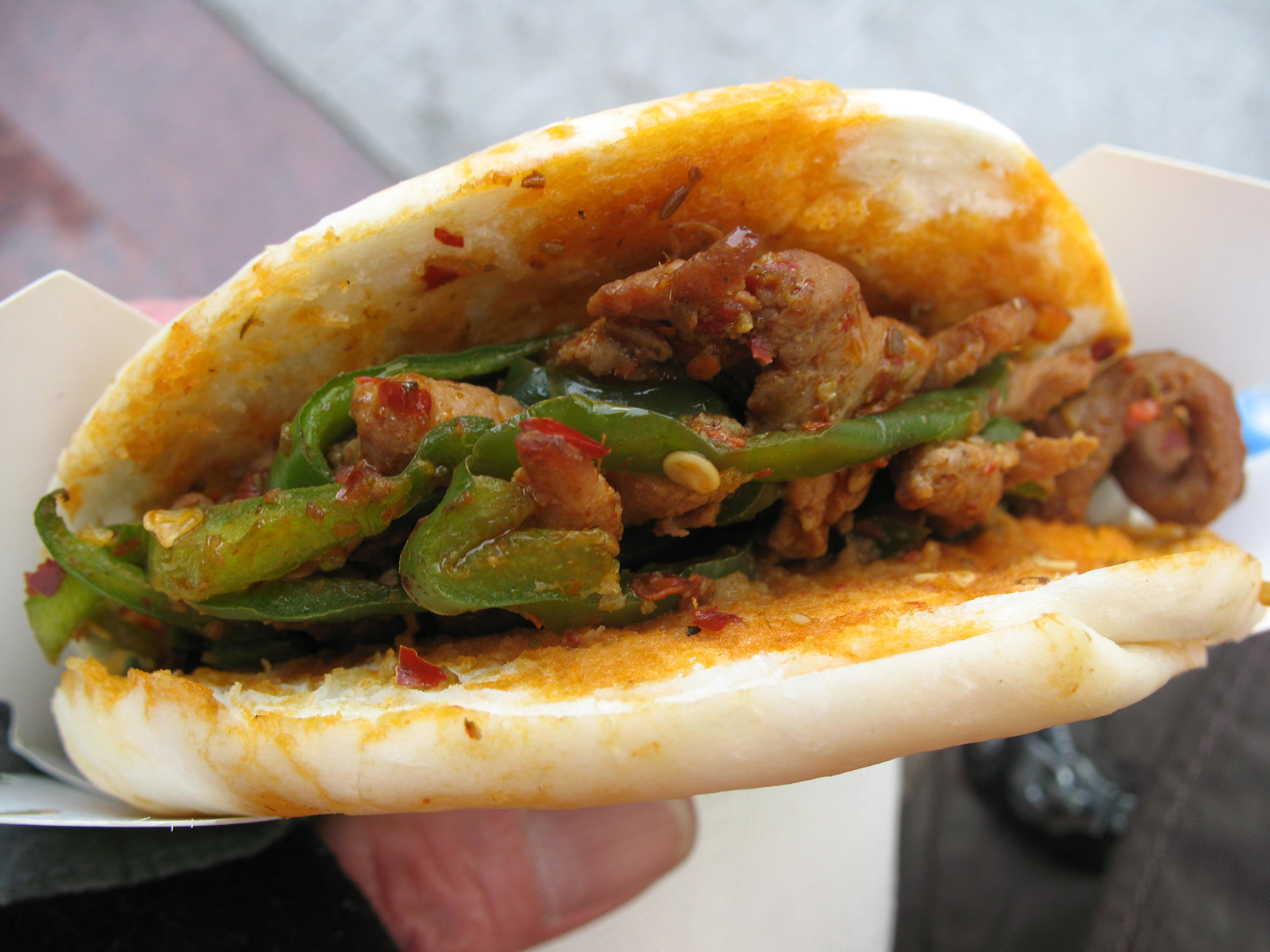
- Roujiamo with meat and bell peppers
- Course: Main course
- Place of origin: China
- Region or state: Shaanxi
- Main ingredients: Pork and flatbread made with yeast
- Variations: Beef, lamb

Roujiamo or rougamo (simplified Chinese: 肉夹馍; traditional Chinese: 肉夾饃; pinyin: ròujiāmó/ròugāmó; lit. 'meat sandwich'), also known as the Chinese hamburger, is a sandwich consisting of a sliced crispy-baked flatbread stuffed with meat and vegetables, originating from the Chinese province of Shaanxi. It is heavily associated with the city of Xi'an, where it is a popular form of street food, and is traditionally said to have been invented during the Warring States period.

== Overview ==
The meat is most commonly pork, stewed for hours in a soup with spices and seasonings.

Some alternatives are also available. For example, in Muslim areas in Xi'an, the meat is usually beef (seasoned with cumin and pepper), and in Gansu Province it is often lamb. The meat is then minced or chopped and stuffed in baijimo (simplified Chinese: 白吉馍; traditional Chinese: 白吉饃; pinyin: báijímó), a type of flatbread. An authentic baijimo is made from a wheat flour dough with yeast and then baked in a clay oven, but now in many parts of China, baijimo is made in a pan. Depending on the types of spices used to cook the meat and the way the bread is made, the taste of roujiamo can vary greatly from vendor to vendor. In Shaanxi, roujiamo is often sold in the form of combo with liangpi and Ice Peak soft drink. It is found with regional modifications across China.

Roujiamo is considered the Chinese equivalent to the Western hamburger and meat sandwiches. Roujiamo is considered to be one of the world's oldest types of hamburgers, since the bread or the "mo" dates back to the Qin dynasty (221–206 BC) and the meat to the Zhou dynasty (1045–256 BC).

== Gallery ==
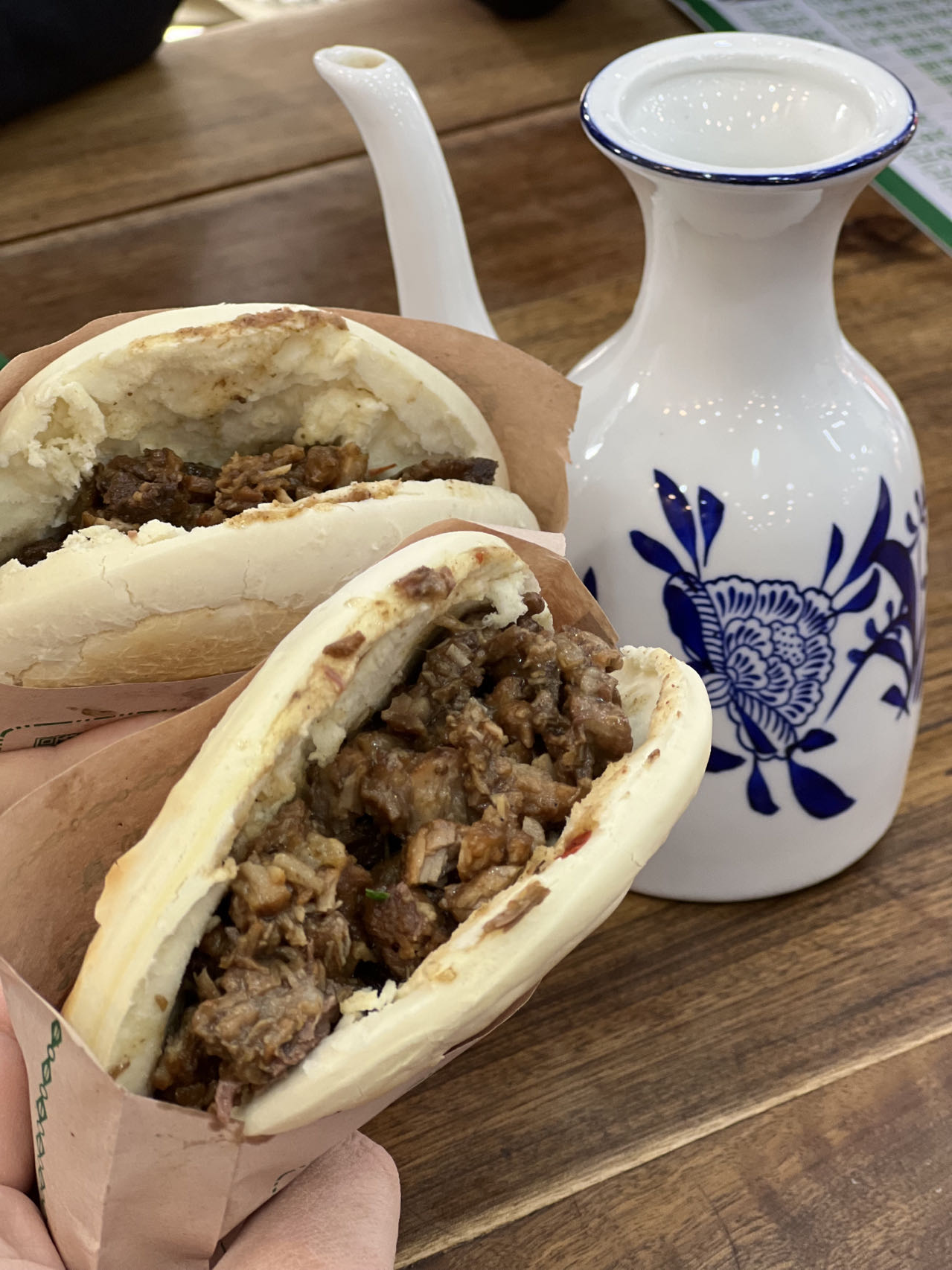

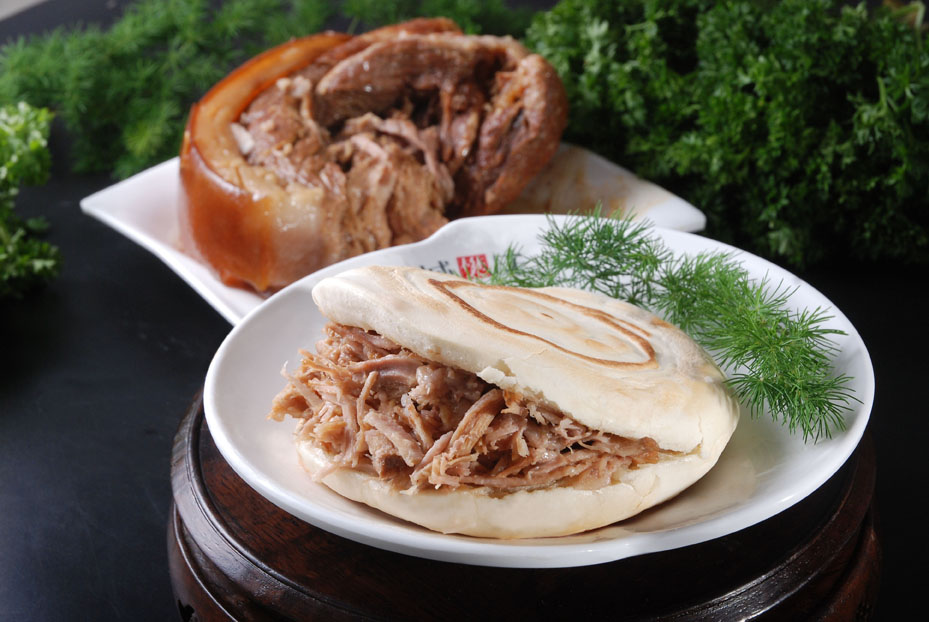

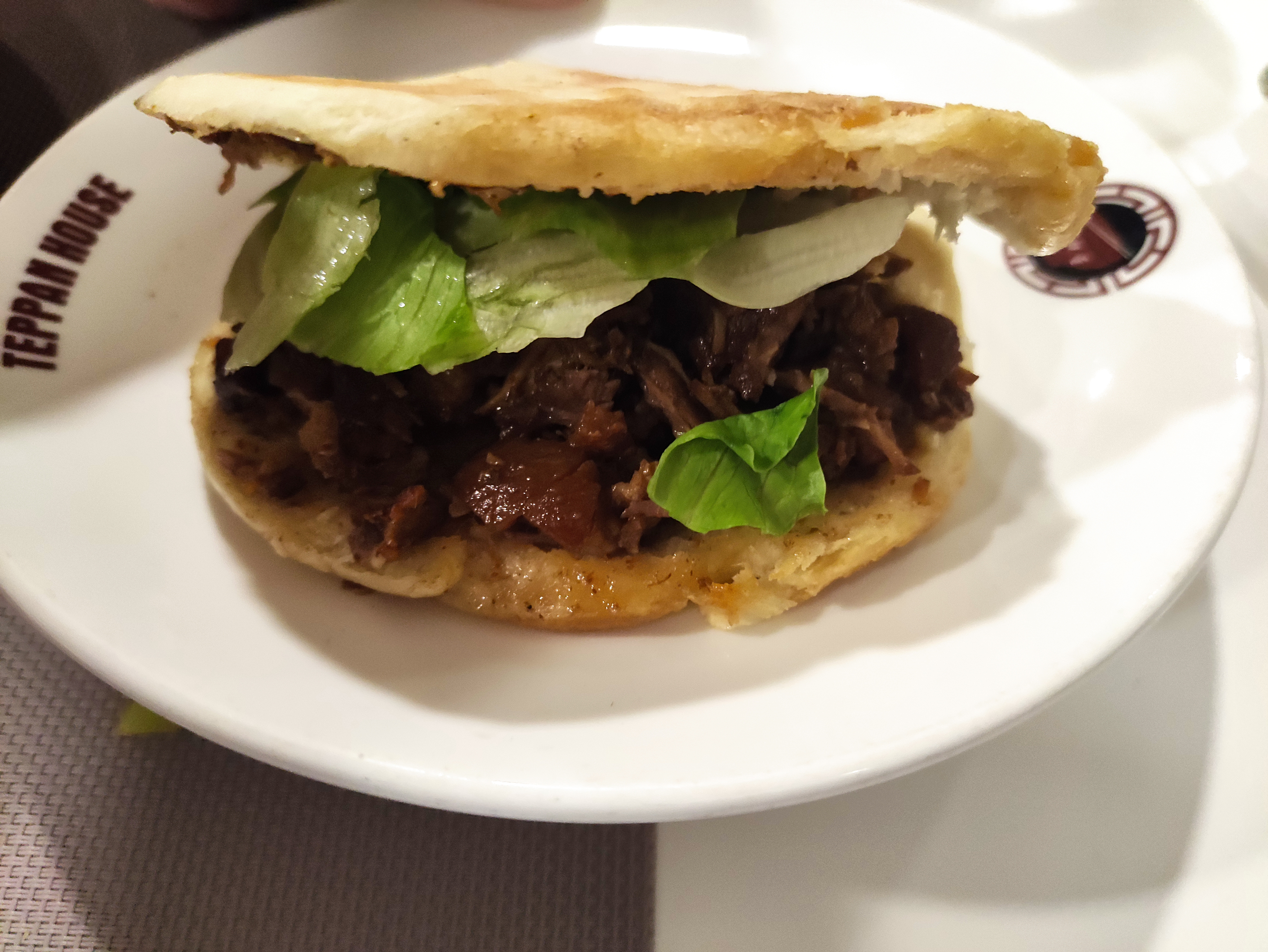

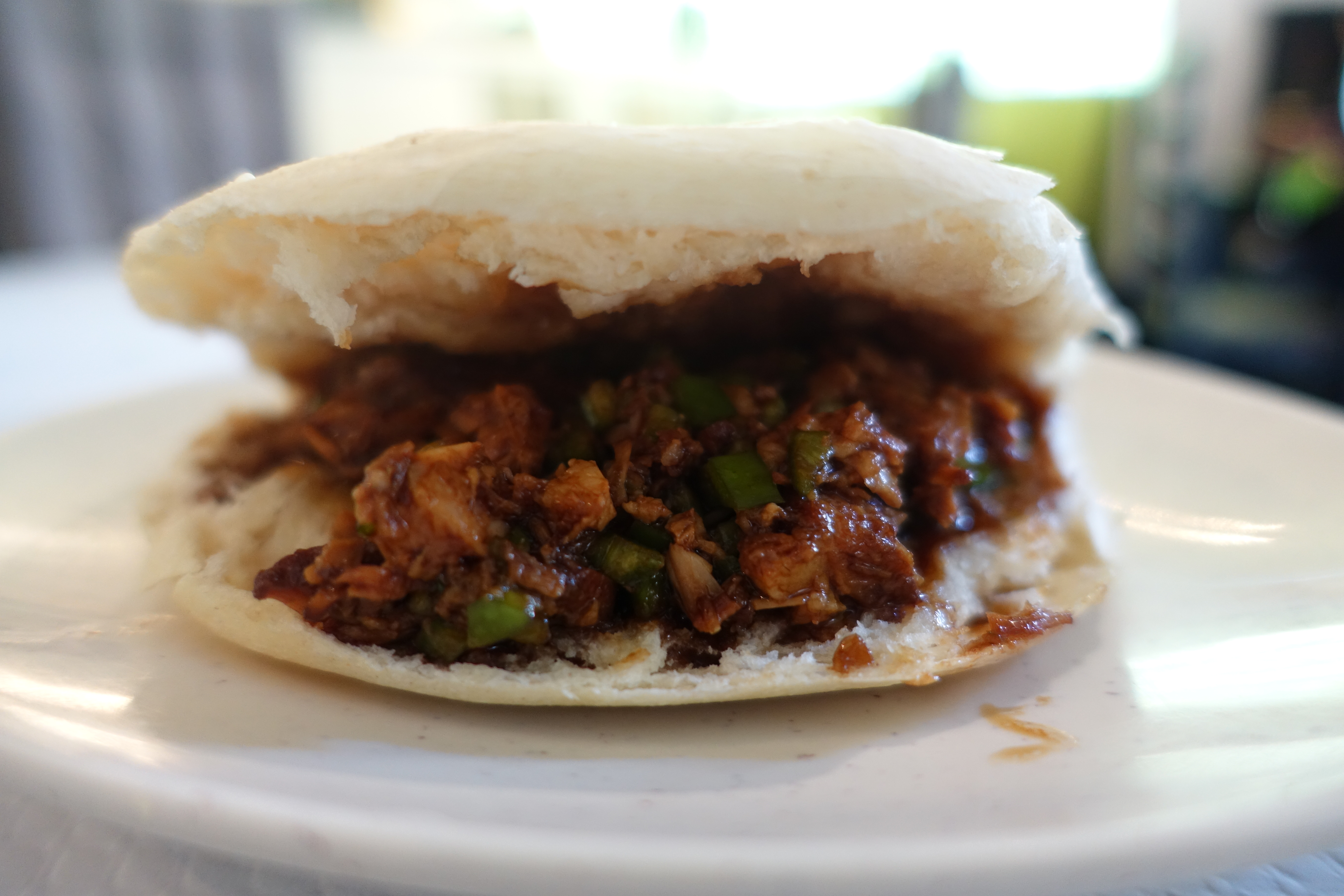

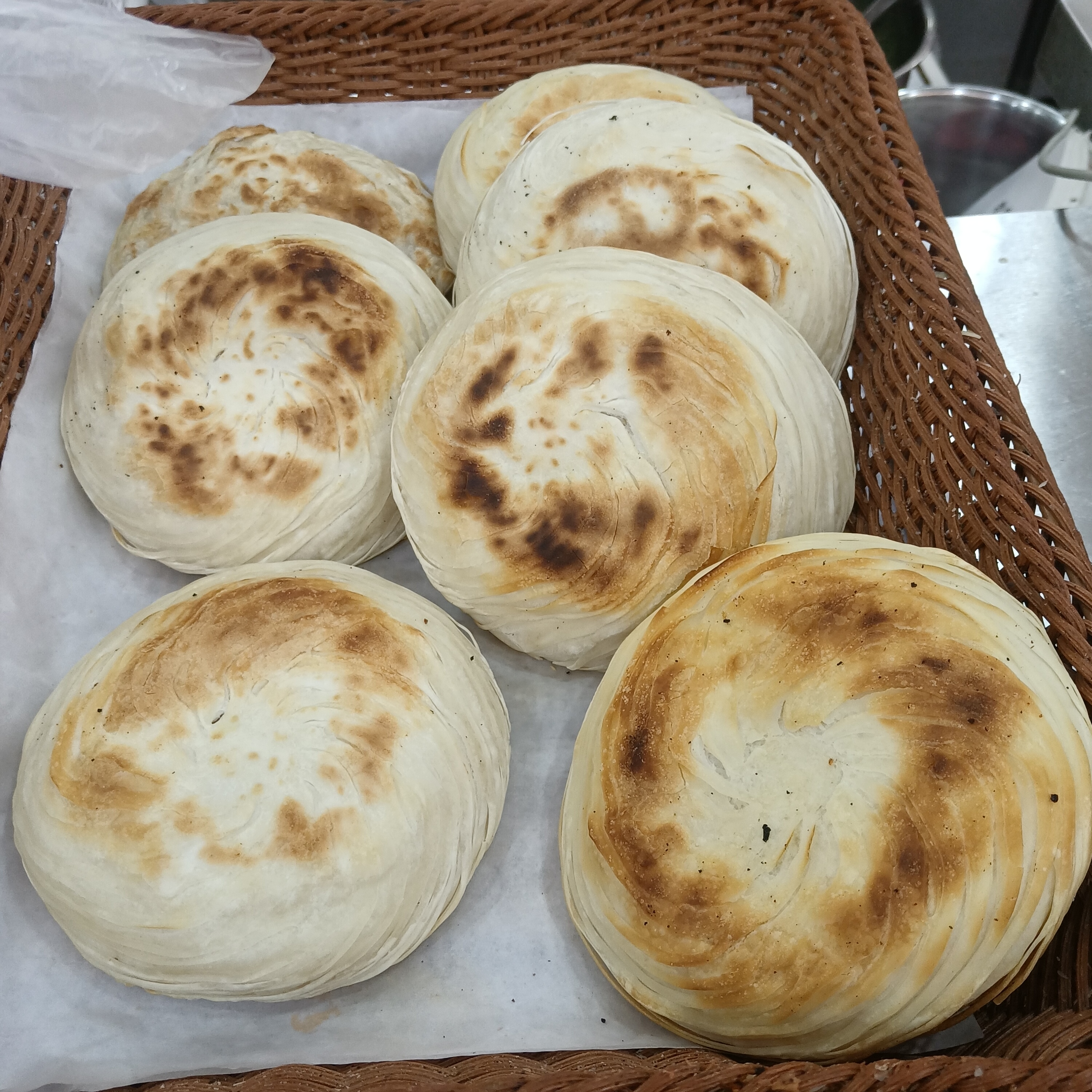

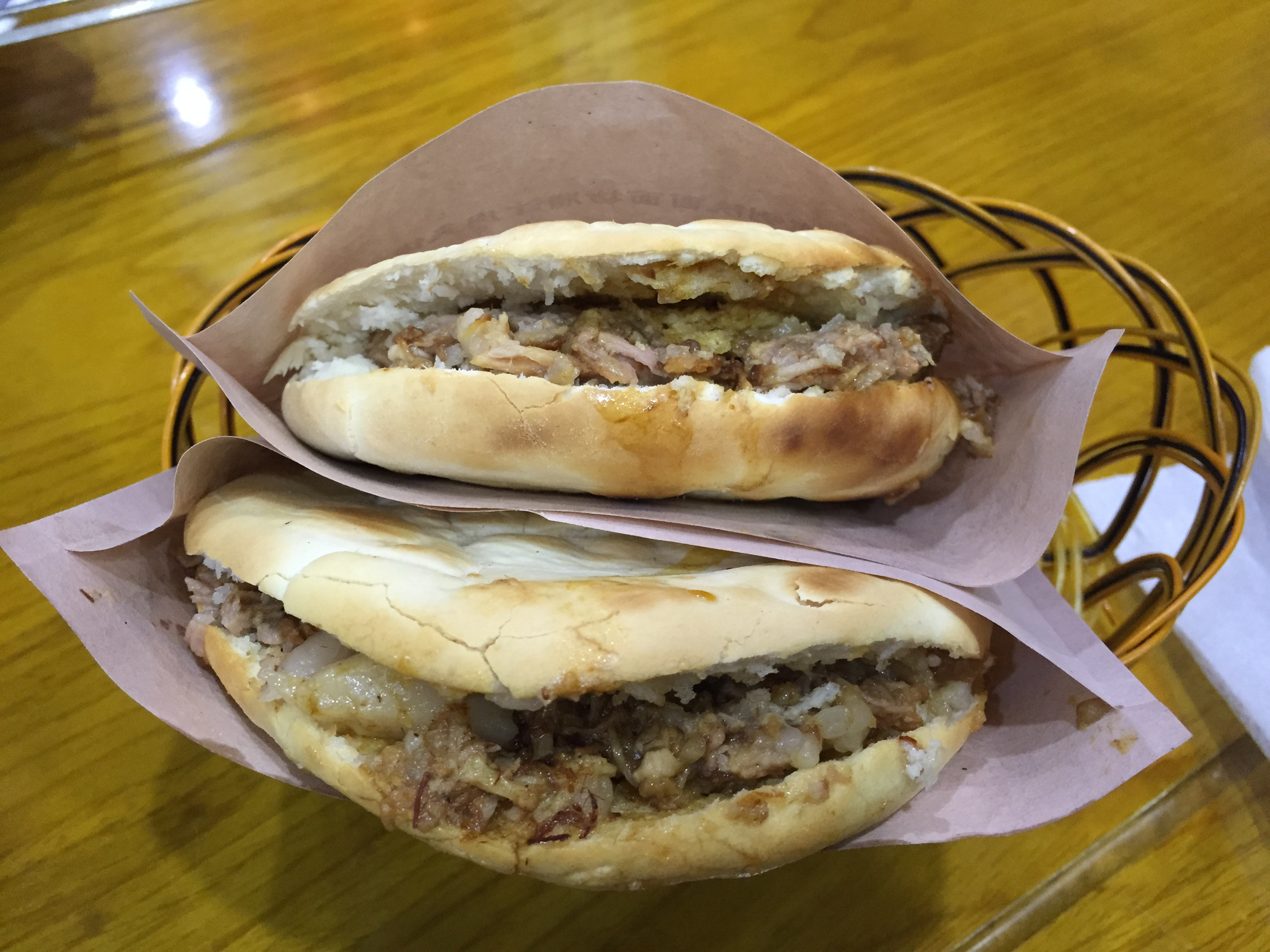

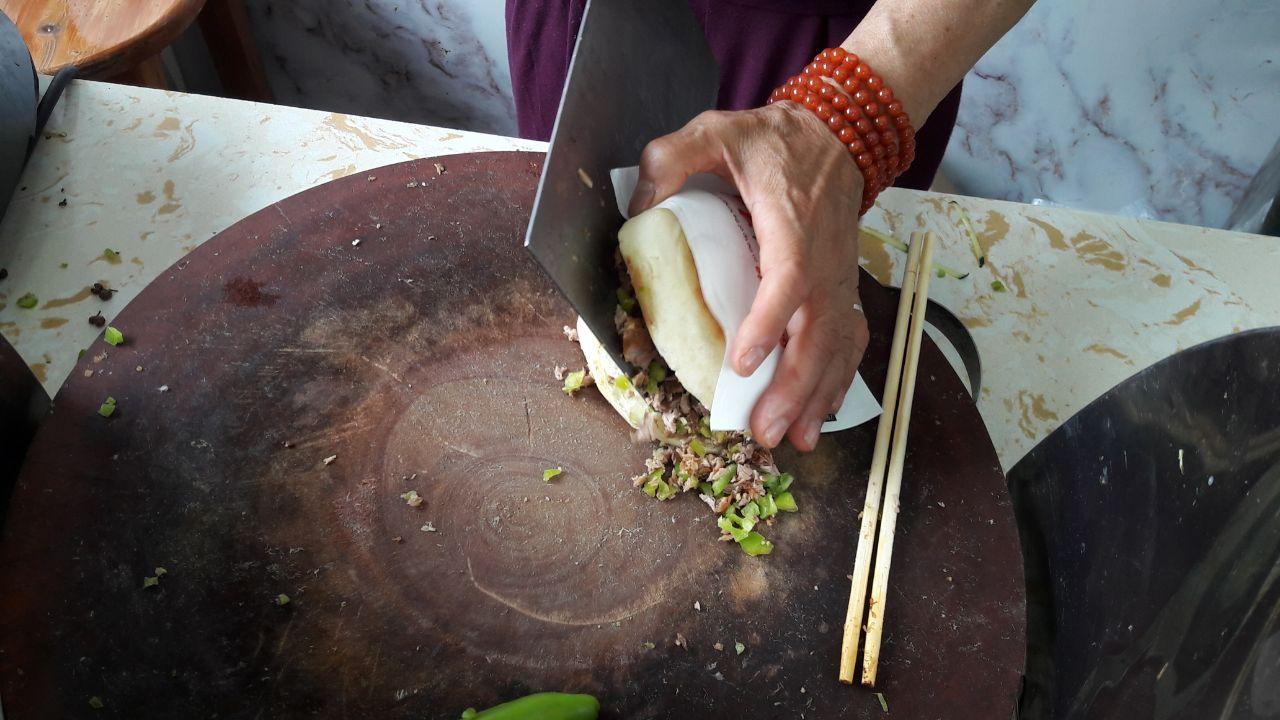
Roujiamo being prepared

== See also ==
- Ice Peak (soft drink)
- Gyros
- Donkey burger
- Gua bao, a Chinese pork belly bun
- List of pork dishes
- List of sandwiches
- Sloppy joe
