= Shanghai cuisine =

Cuisine originating from Shanghai, China

- Chinese: 上海菜
Transcriptions
Standard Mandarin
- Hanyu Pinyin: Shànghǎi cài
Wu
- Romanization: zaon⁶ he⁵ tshe⁵

Hu cuisine
- Simplified Chinese: 沪菜
- Traditional Chinese: 滬菜
Transcriptions
Standard Mandarin
- Hanyu Pinyin: Hù cài
Wu
- Romanization: wu⁶ tshe⁵

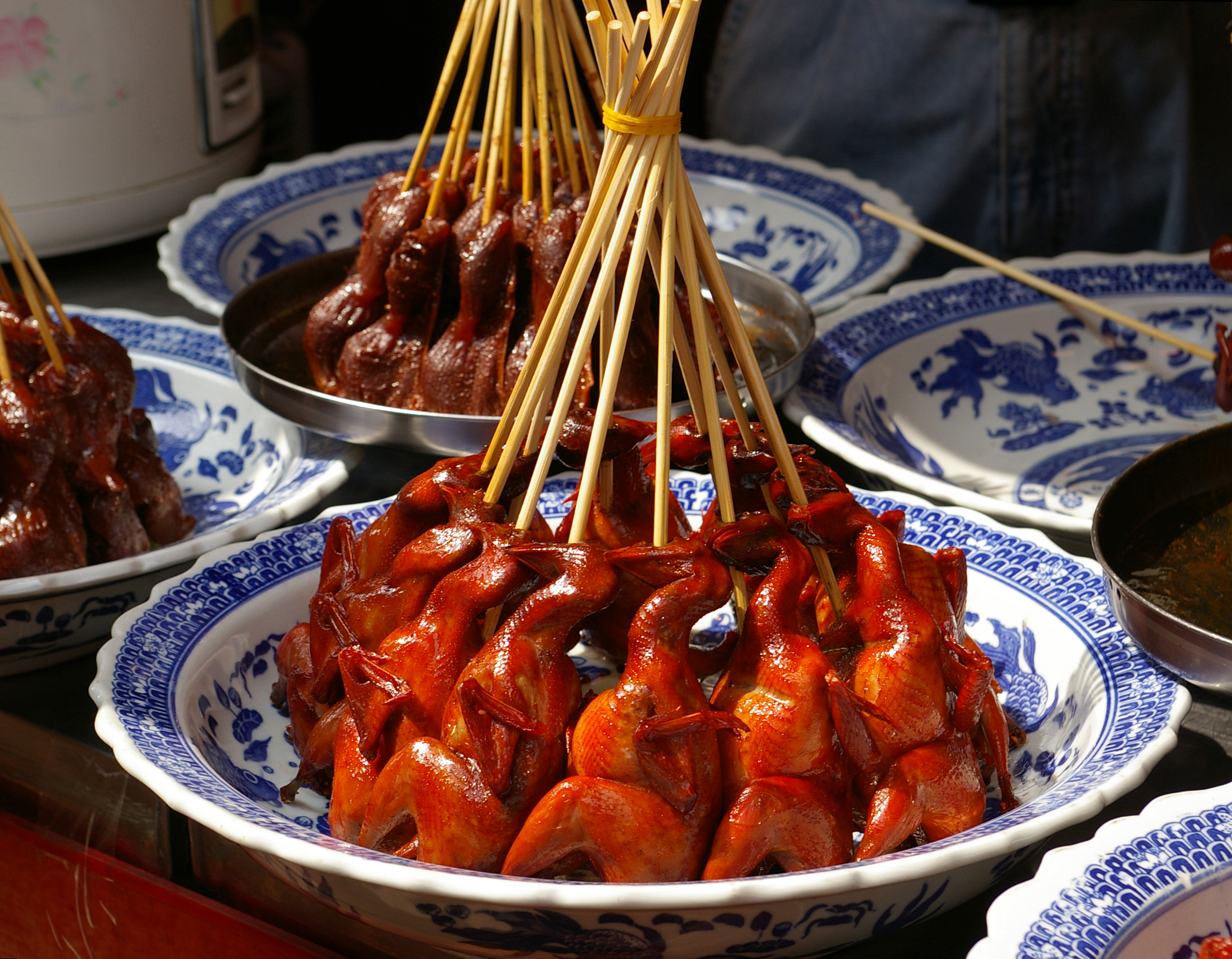
Skewered quail is a common street food in Qibao Town, Shanghai.

Shanghai cuisine (Chinese: 上海菜; pinyin: Shànghǎi cài; Shanghainese: zaon⁶ he⁵ tshe¹; IPA: [zɑ̃¹¹ he⁴⁴ tsʰᴇ¹¹]), also known as Hu cuisine (simplified Chinese: 沪菜; traditional Chinese: 滬菜; pinyin: Hù cài; Shanghainese: wu⁶ tshe¹; IPA: [ɦu¹¹ tsʰᴇ⁴⁴]), is a popular style of Chinese food. In a narrow sense, Shanghai cuisine refers only to what is traditionally called Benbang cuisine (本帮菜; 本幫菜; Běnbāng cài; pen⁵ paon¹ tshe⁵; 'local cuisine') which originated in Shanghai. In a broader sense, it refers to complex styles of cooking developed under the influence of neighboring Jiangsu and Zhejiang provinces.

The dishes within the cuisine need to master the three elements of "color, aroma, and taste" (色香味). Like other cuisines within China, Shanghai cuisine emphasizes the use of seasonings, the quality of raw ingredients, and preserving the original flavors of ingredients. The adoption of Western influence in Shanghai cuisine resulted in a unique cooking style known as Haipai cuisine (海派菜).

== Characteristic features ==
The four classic words used to describe Shanghai food are "浓油赤酱", meaning that Shanghai food uses a considerable amount of oil and soy sauce. Both dark soy sauce and regular soy sauce are used in Shanghai cooking, which gives dishes a red and shiny appearance. Dark soy sauce creates a dark amber color in dishes, while regular soy sauce enhances the flavor. Sugar is often added to soy sauce.

Dishes are prepared using various methods, such as baking, stewing, braising, steaming, and deep-frying. Fish, crab, and chicken are made "drunken" using spirits and brisk cooking techniques. Salted meats and preserved vegetables are commonly used in dishes. Rice is more commonly served than noodles or other wheat products.

Shanghai cuisine emphasizes the use of condiments while retaining the original flavors of raw ingredients. It aims for lightness in flavor and is mellower and slightly sweet in taste compared to some other Chinese cuisines. Sweet and sour is a typical Shanghai taste. In Shanghai cuisine, the presentation of dishes is also important. Ingredients are carefully cut and arranged to create a harmonious color scheme.

In the early 20th century, Shanghai families did not typically include fish in their daily meals, despite the city being a port town. Meat was considered a luxury, and meals were typically made up of vegetables, beans, and rice. Families would typically eat meat or fish for four meals within a month, on the second, eighth, sixteenth, and twenty-third days, which became known as dang hun. Nowadays, with increased awareness of nutrition, people eat more low-sugar and low-fat food and more vegetables to promote a healthier diet.

== History ==
Shanghai cuisine is the youngest of the ten major cuisines of China, although it still has more than 400 years of history. Traditionally called Benbang cuisine, it originated in the Ming and Qing dynasties (c. 1368–1840). During the reign of Emperor Jiaqing and Emperor Guangxu of the Qing Dynasty, a food stall was set up in the old city of Shanghai called "Shovel Bang" (铲刀帮). After 1930, as Shanghai's industry and commerce rapidly developed, the main customers of Benbang cuisine were an emerging class of workers. As a result, the proportion of inexpensive dishes in Benbang cuisine began to decrease.

In the later part of the 19th century, after Shanghai became a major domestic and international trading port, Benbang dishes underwent substantial change. After the opening of Shanghai port in 1843, sixteen different catering schools opened in Shanghai. Anhui cuisine was the first to gain popularity in Shanghai, followed by Suxi cuisine, Cantonese cuisine, Huaiyang cuisine, and Beijing cuisine. In the 1930s, Suxi cuisine was prevalent in almost half of Shanghai's restaurants. Guangdong cuisine was highly popular among both residents of Shanghai and foreigners. As a result of adopting influences from other cuisines, the flavors of Shanghai cuisine became more complex.

Western influence in Shanghai cuisine resulted in the development of a unique cooking style known as Haipai cuisine (海派菜). At the time, eating Western food was considered fashionable, but Chinese people initially struggled to adapt to certain aspects of Western cuisine, such as rare steak. Western food in Shanghai was influenced by many countries but formed its own distinct characteristics. Russian Shanghai Western food, which typically included one main dish and one soup (such as borscht, bread and butter), became particularly popular in Shanghai due to its economic benefits. Before 1937, there were over 200 Western restaurants in Shanghai, particularly on Xiafei Road and Fuzhou Road.

Nowadays, Shanghai's traditional cuisine is usually found only in home-cooked meals and some old Benbang restaurants. Shanghai is now more famous for its numerous exotic restaurants, especially those serving Japanese and French food.

== Notable dishes in Shanghai cuisine ==
=== Breakfast ===
Breakfast food in Shanghai includes dishes mainly made from wheat, rice, and flour. Many of them are influenced by Cantonese, Jiangsu, and Zhejiang cuisine, and through historical precipitation, these breakfasts have gained favor to many people in Shanghai today. The most classic Shanghai breakfast is called "The Four Warriors" (四大金刚; 四大金剛; Sìdà Jīngāng; sy⁵ du⁶ cin¹ kaon¹). These are the four most popular breakfast choices for Shanghainese.

- Glutinous rice rolls (粢飯; cīfàn; tshy¹ ve⁶)
- Soy milk (豆浆; 豆漿; dòujiāng; deu⁶ cian¹)
- Chinese cruller (油条; 油條; yóutiáo; yeu⁶ diau⁶)
- Sesame pancake (大饼; 大餅; dàbǐng; da⁶ pin⁵)

=== Seafood ===
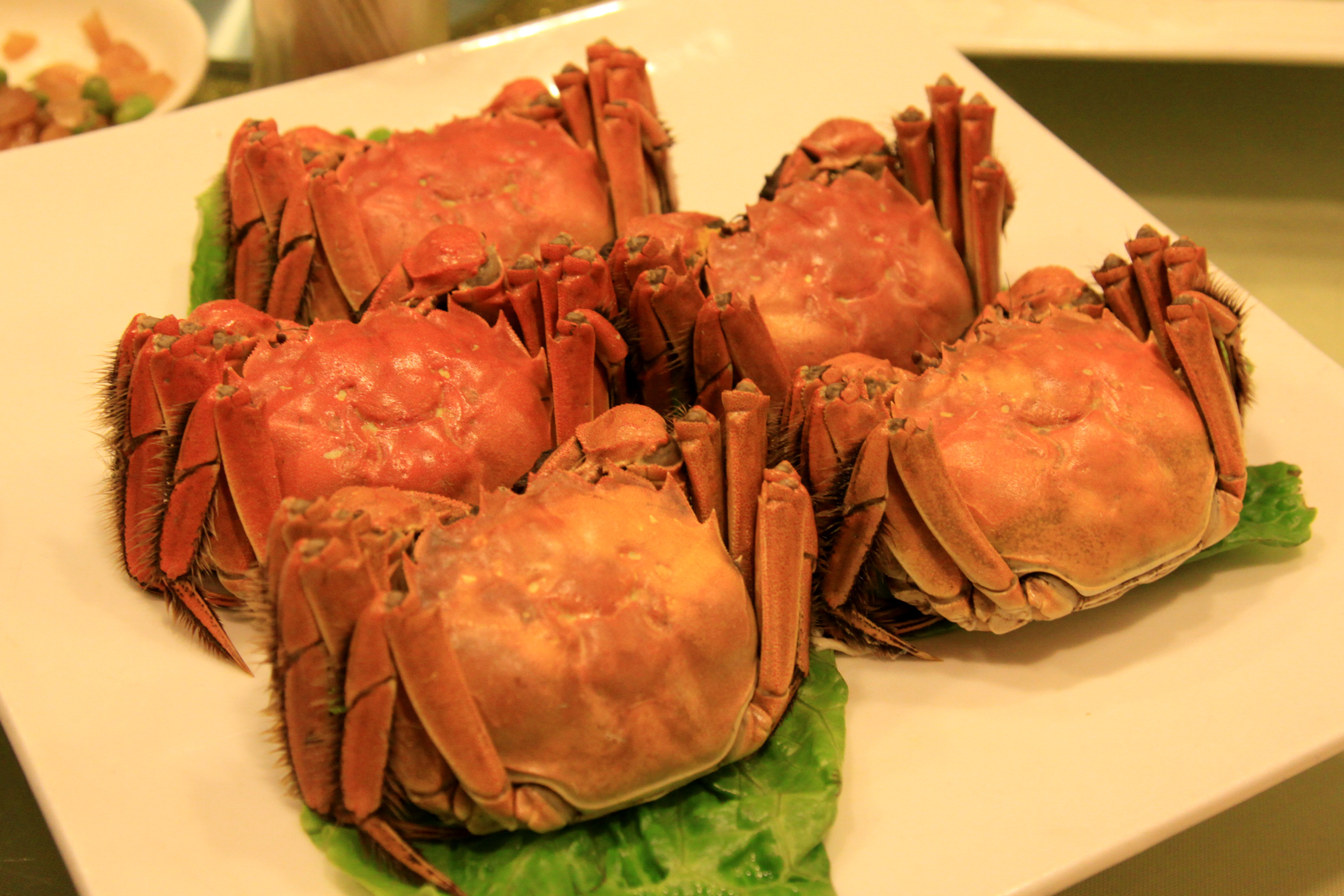
Shanghai hairy crab's original taste is best preserved with steaming.

Seafood is commonly seen in Shanghai cuisine. These are some popular dishes.

- Eel noodles (鳗鱼面; 鰻魚麵; Mányú Miàn; moe⁶ ng⁶ mi⁶) – Made with sliced eels and wheat noodles.
- Scallion stewed crucian carp (葱烧鲫鱼; 蔥燒鯽魚; Cōngshāo Jìyú; tshon¹ sau¹ ciq⁷ ng⁶) – The preparation of this common crucian carp dish is quite involved and complex. It requires a significant amount of time to prepare, as the fish must be soaked in vinegar, deep-fried, stewed for a prolonged period, and cooled to make it tender enough to be consumed with all its bones. The difficulty in perfecting this dish, as well as its complexity, led to it being used as a test by families when recruiting a cook.
- Shanghai hairy crab (上海毛蟹; Shànghǎi Máo Xiè; zaon⁶ he⁵ mau⁶ ha⁵) – A variety of Chinese mitten crab. The crab is usually steamed with ginger, and eaten with a dipping sauce of rice vinegar, sugar, and ginger. Crab meat can be mixed with lard to make xiefen, or consumed in xiaolongbao or with tofu.
- Squirrel-shaped mandarin fish (松鼠桂鱼; 松鼠桂魚; Sōngshǔ Guīyú; son¹ tshy⁵ kue⁵ ng⁶) – This dish features fresh mandarin fish and combines sweet and sour flavors. The fish is deep-fried and has a crispy exterior and soft interior. The dish is yellow and red, and it is displayed in the shape of a squirrel when plated. Hot broth is poured over it, which produces a high-pitched sound. It could be referring to a cooking technique where the addition of hot liquid (like broth) to certain ingredients (perhaps something crispy or dry) results in a distinct sound, typically due to the rapid steaming or bubbling.
- Crystal shrimp (水晶虾仁; 水晶蝦仁; Shuǐjīng xiārén) – A dish featuring shrimp and eggs, with no additional ingredients. The shrimp is cooked until just translucent, giving its "crystal" name. Well-prepared crystal shrimp is tender yet crispy, with a robust shrimp flavor and a reddish hue tinged with milky white.

=== Meat and poultry ===
- Beggar's chicken (叫花鸡; 叫花雞; jiàohuā jī; ciau⁵ ho⁵ ci¹ or ciau⁵ hua⁵ ci¹) – Beggar's chicken calls for a chicken wrapped in lotus leaves, encased in mud, and roasted in fire. According to a legend, a beggar in the Qing dynasty stole and hid a chicken under mud, hence the name of the dish.
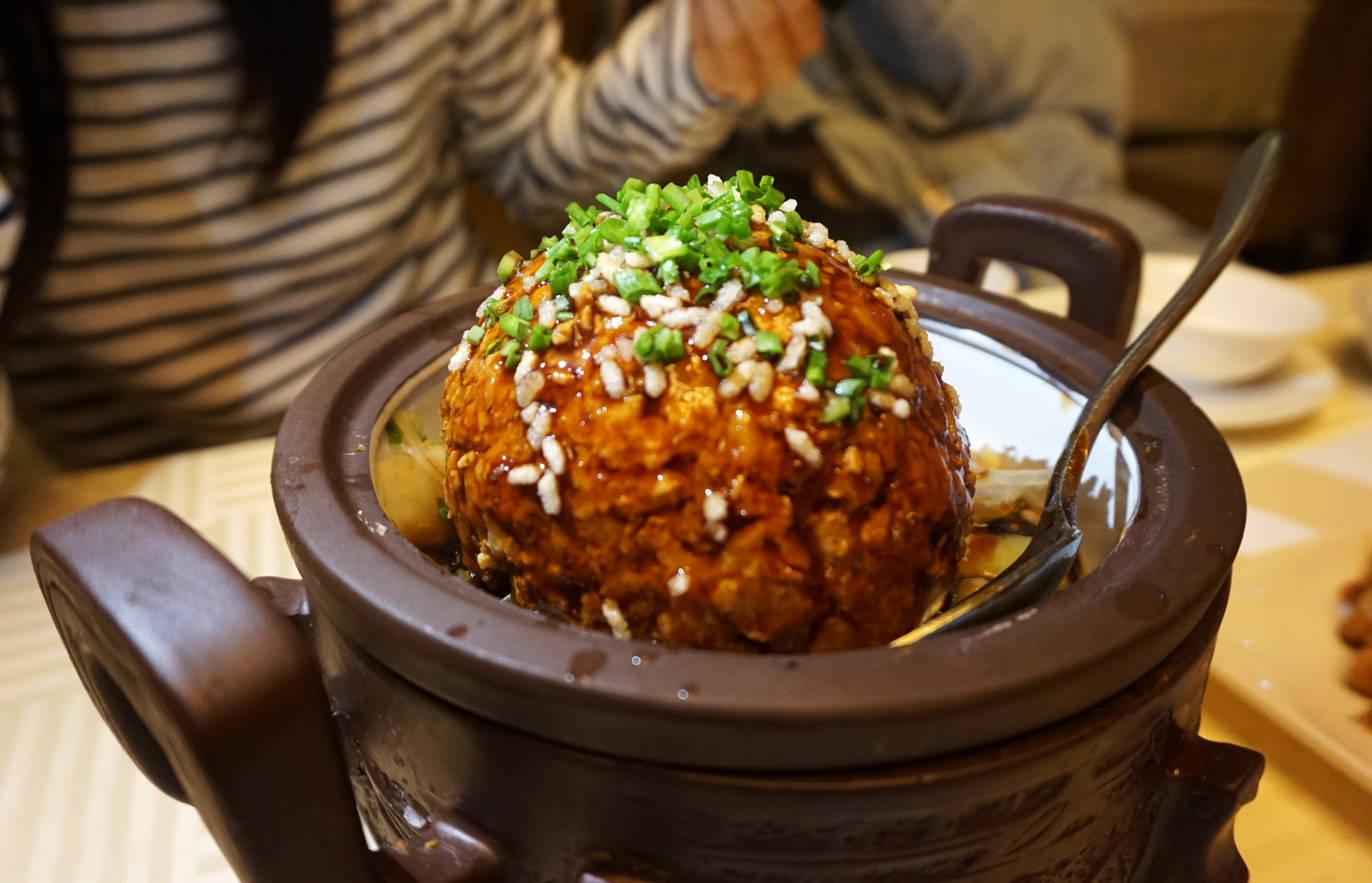
- Lion's Head
  Lion's head (狮子头; 獅子頭; shīzi tóu; sy¹ tsy⁵ deu⁶) – This dish gets its name from the shape of the pork meatball resembling a lion's head and the cabbage, or other vegetables, resembling the lion's mane. It is served in two varieties: white (or plain) and red. The red version is cooked with soy sauce and is typically served in a white pot.
- Red braised pork belly (红烧肉; 紅燒肉; hóngshāo ròu; ghon⁶ sau¹ gnioq⁸) – Braised pork belly cooked in Shanghainese soy sauce for an extended period of time.
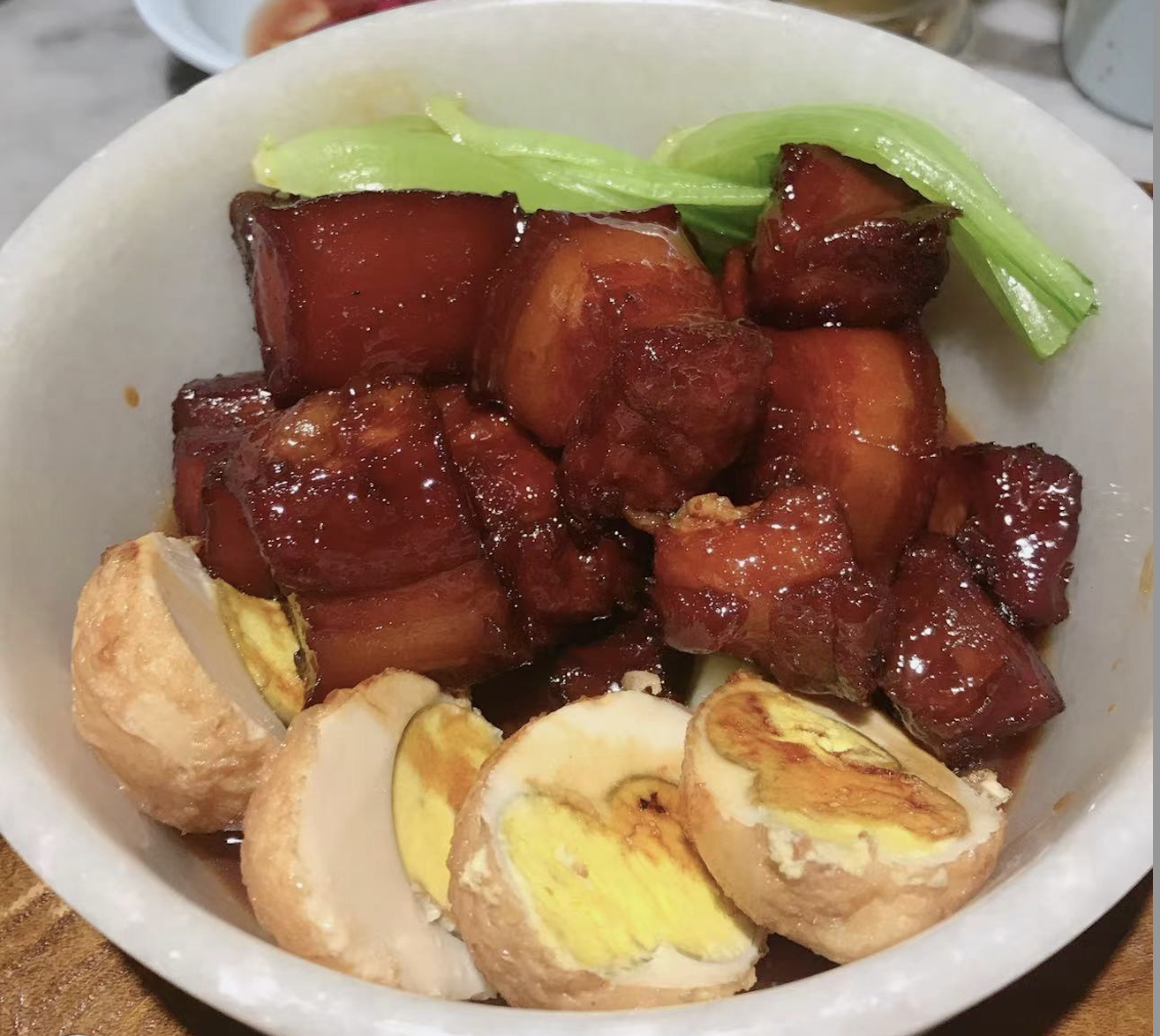
  Red braised pork belly, a classic Shanghai dish
- Sweet and sour spareribs (糖醋排骨; táng cù páigǔ; daon⁶ tshu⁵ ba⁶ kueq⁷) – The fresh pork ribs, which appear shiny and red after being cooked, are traditionally deep-fried, then coated in a sweet and sour sauce.

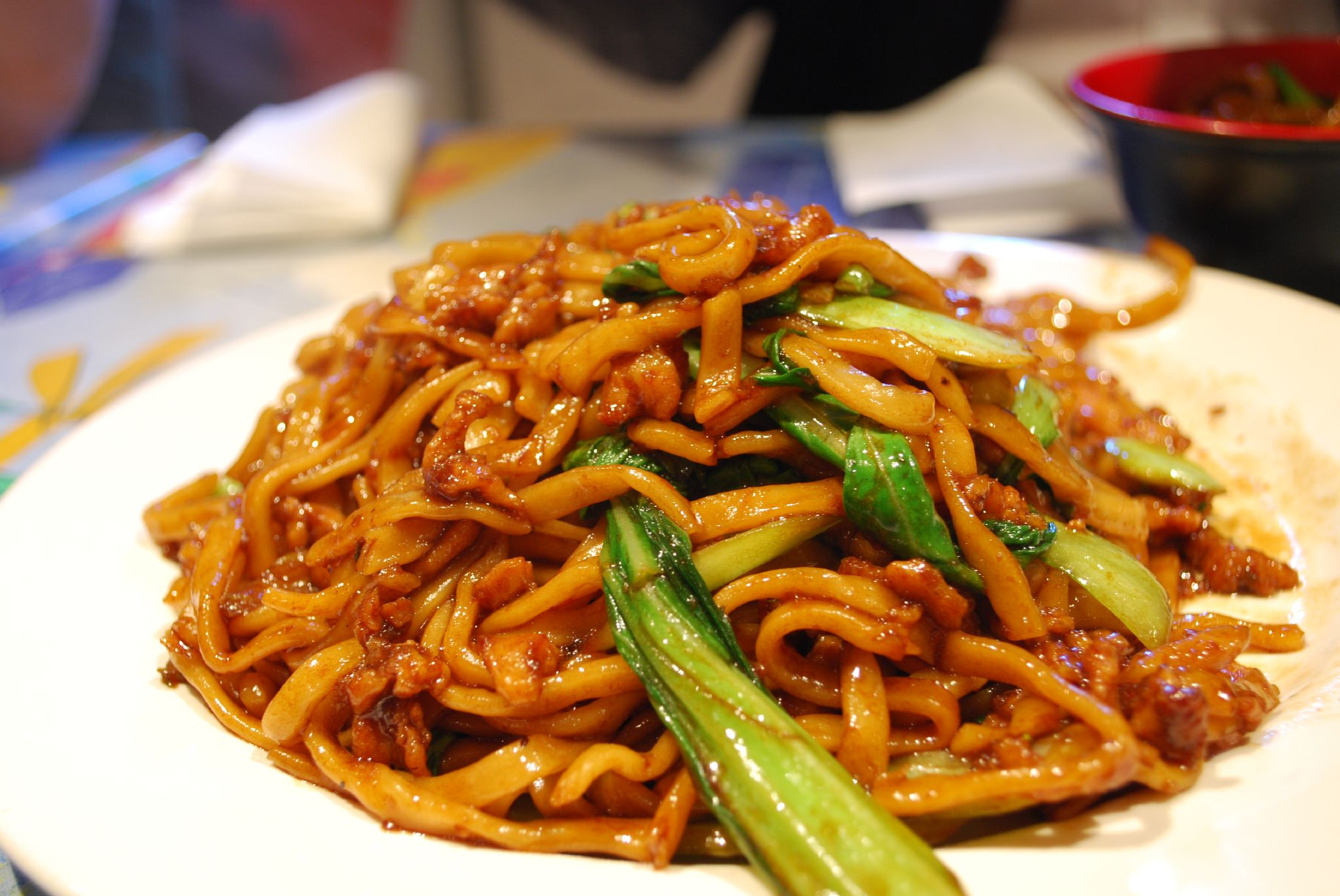
Fried noodles with bok choy and pork with a soy sauce base

- Dongpo pork (Chinese: 东坡肉; pinyin: dōngpōròu) - The pork is typically cut into thick, approximately 5 centimeter (2.0 inch) squares, with an even distribution of fat and lean meat, while retaining the skin.
- Pork ribs and rice cakes (排骨年糕; Páigǔ niángāo) - A traditional dish in Shanghai. This dish uses pork ribs paired with small and thin rice cakes, which are cooked through oil blanching and simmering. The pork ribs have a golden color, a crispy surface, and tender meat while the rice cakes are soft and chewy.

=== Noodles ===
- Shanghai fried noodles (上海炒面; 上海炒麵; Shànghǎi Chǎomiàn; zaon⁶ he⁵ tshau⁵ mi⁶) – Shanghai fried noodles are fried thick noodles (sometimes udon) with soy sauce. It is most commonly cooked with bok choy and pork.
- Chilled noodles (冷面; 冷麵; Lěngmiàn; lan⁶ mi⁶) – This dish is a combination of chilled noodles mixed with various sauces and toppings. Traditionally, the noodles are steamed before being cooked for improved flavor. After the noodles are cooled, they are mixed with sesame oil, soy sauce, and peanut sauce. People often add additional toppings when making it at home, and commonly use leftover food they have in the fridge.
- Noodle soup (汤面; 湯麵; Tāngmiàn; thaon¹ mi⁶) – Su-style noodles are a common type of noodle soup. There are two different soup bases, and it is typically garnished with various toppings, mostly meat.
- Scallion oil noodles (葱油拌面; 蔥油拌麵; Cōng yóu bàn miàn; tshon^{1} yeu^{6} boe^{6} mi^{6}) – A popular noodle dish in Shanghai that can be found in many local restaurants and food stalls. The scallion oil is made by crisping and browning chopped scallions in hot oil. The dish is then coated in scallion oil, soy sauce, and spices, blending savory, sweet, and mildly spicy flavors.

=== Soup ===
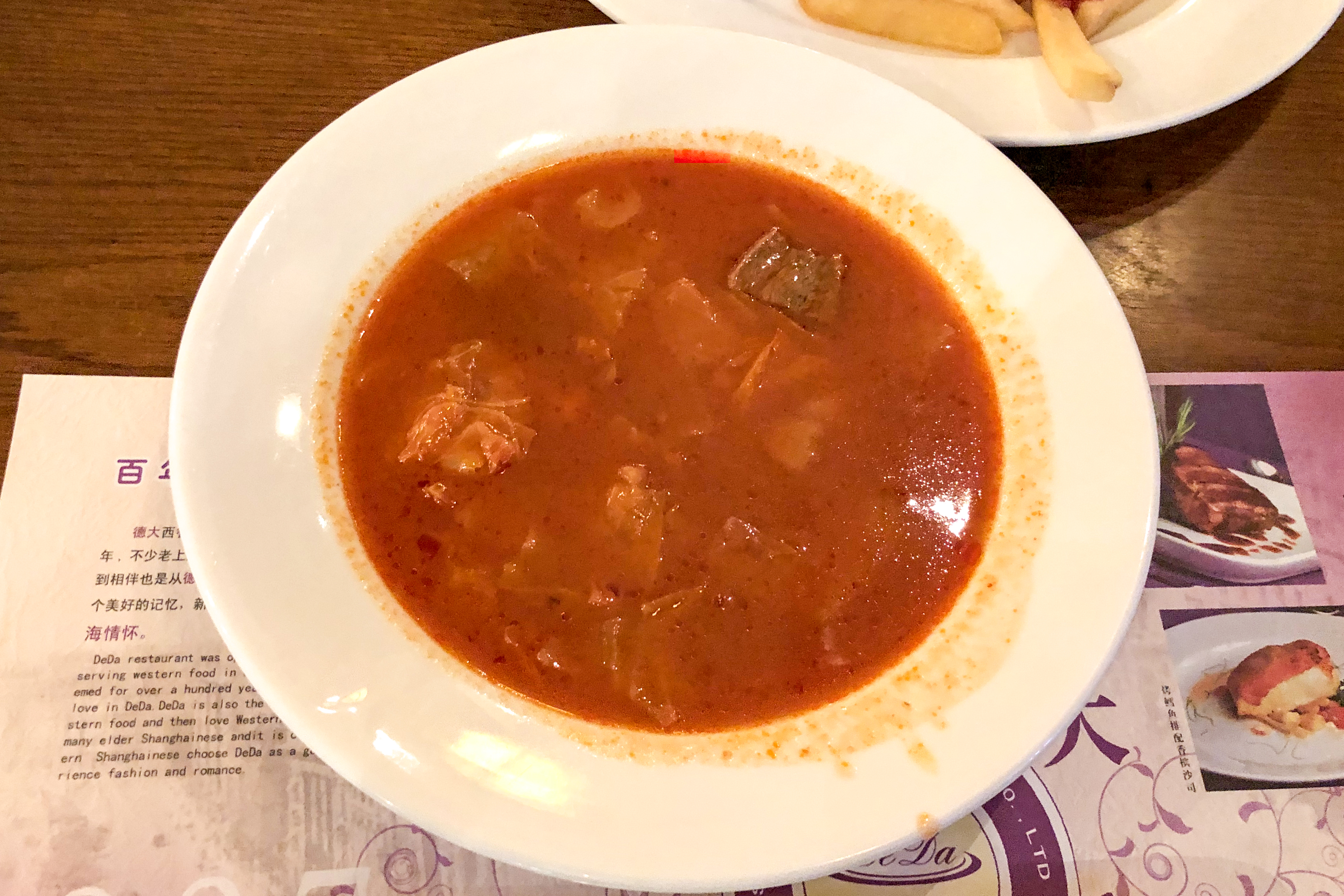
- A bowl of Shanghai-style borscht
  Borscht (罗宋汤; 羅宋湯; Luósòng Tāng; lu⁶ son⁵ thaon¹) – This dish is a combination of tomatoes and beef. It is considered a classic Shanghai dish that incorporates local elements of Shanghai cuisine. Originally introduced to Shanghai from Russia, it has now become a common dish in Shanghai homes.

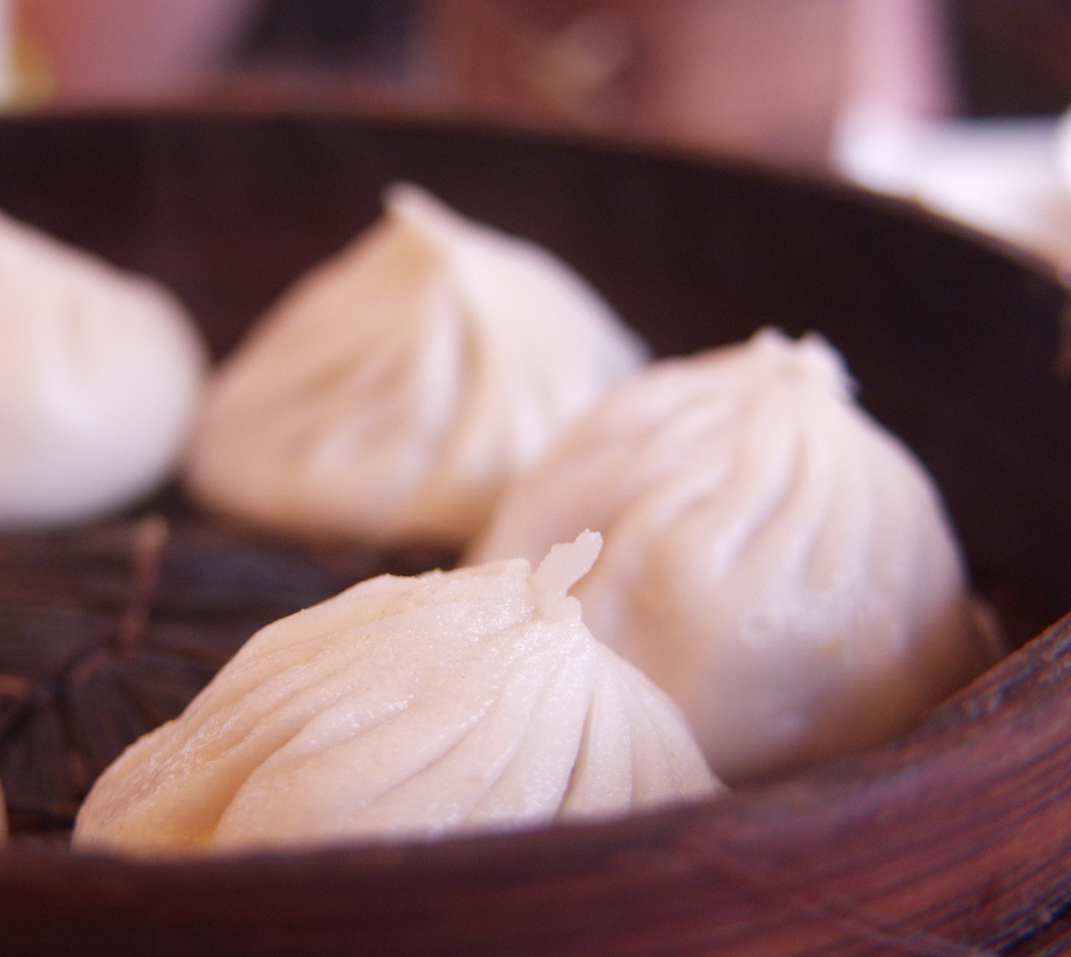
Xiaolongbao, a type of steamed bun from the Jiangnan region

=== Snacks ===
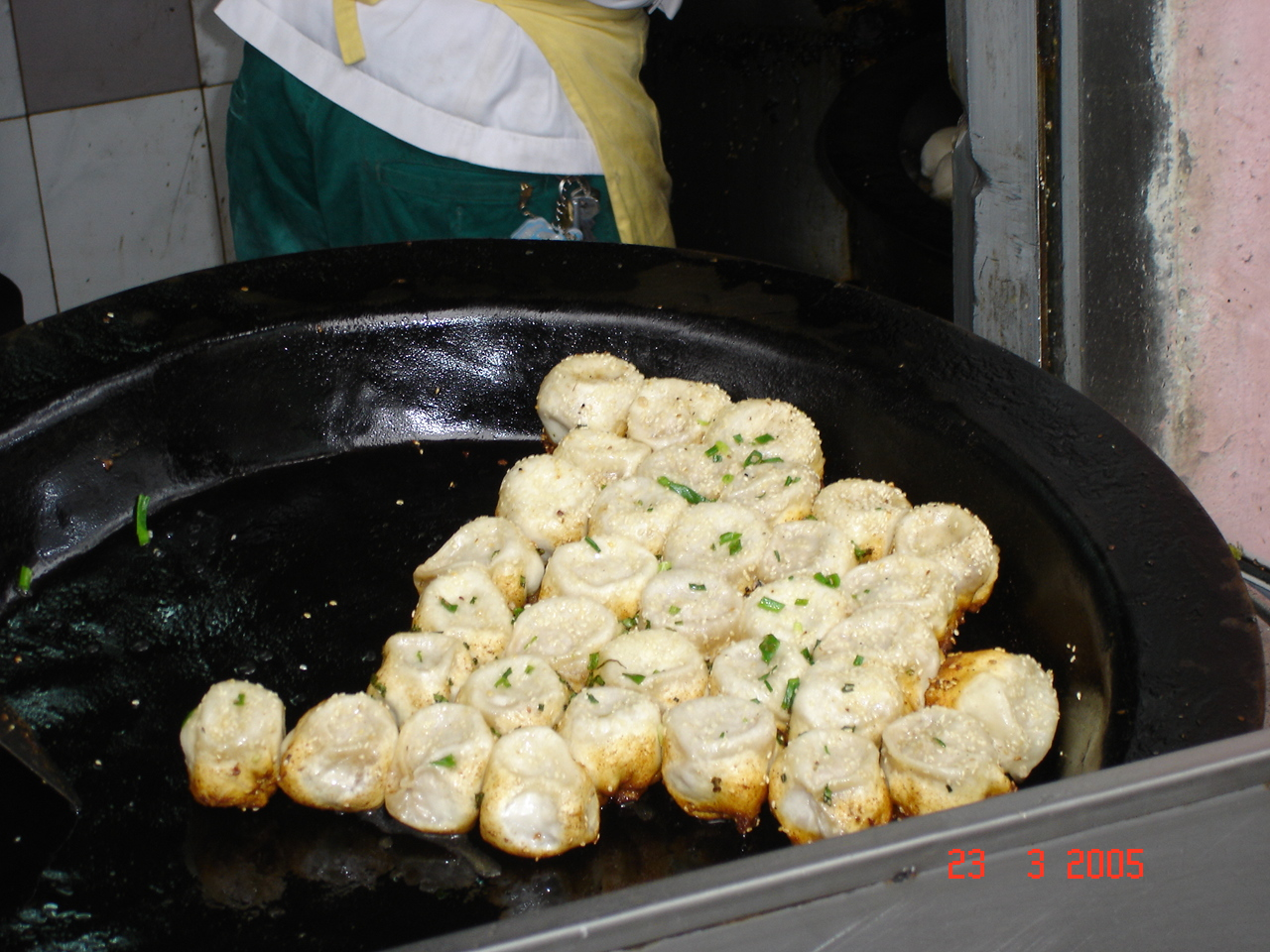
- Shengjian mantou
  Shengjian mantou (生煎馒头; 生煎饅頭; Shēngjiān Mántóu; san¹ ci¹ moe⁶ deu⁶) or Shengjianbao (生煎包; Shēngjiān bāo; san¹ ci¹ pau¹) – A Shanghai mantou is a round bun filled with pork, similar to a xiaolongbao but thicker due to the addition of yeast. It is pan-fried and topped with sesame seeds and chopped scallions for flavor.
- Xiaolongbao (小笼包; 小籠包; Xiǎolóngbāo; shiau⁵ lon⁶ pau¹, known locally as 小笼馒头; 小籠饅頭; shiau⁵ lon⁶ moe⁶ deu⁶) – A type of steamed dumpling made with a thin skin of dough and stuffed with pork or minced crab meat, and soup. The delicious soup stays inside the dumpling until it is bitten.
- Guotie (锅贴; 鍋貼; ku¹ thiq⁷) or potstickers – Essentially Jiaozi (Chinese dumplings), but rather than being boiled or steamed, they are first fried in oil on one side, then steamed by adding a small amount of water and covering the pan. When the water evaporates, the dumpling is crispy on one side and soft and chewy on the other. Traditionally, guotie is filled with ground pork and finely chopped Chinese scallions or cabbage.
- Savory mooncakes (鲜肉月饼; 鮮肉月餅; shi¹ gnioq⁸ yuq⁸ pin⁵) – Mooncakes consumed in other parts of China are usually sweet, with fillings such as sesame seeds, walnuts, and red bean paste. However, in Shanghai, during the Mid-Autumn Festival, locals consume a savory version of mooncakes filled with meat. This type of mooncake is usually only available at select local restaurants.

=== Desserts ===
- Tangyuan (汤圆; 湯圓; Tāngyuán; thaon¹ yoe⁶) – A type of sweet dumpling made of glutinous rice flour and stuffed with black sesame. Qibao has a number of tangyuan vendors.

== See also ==
- Chinese cuisine
- Haipai cuisine
- Jiangsu cuisine
- List of Chinese dishes
