= Ice Peak (soft drink) =

Chinese brand of orange soda

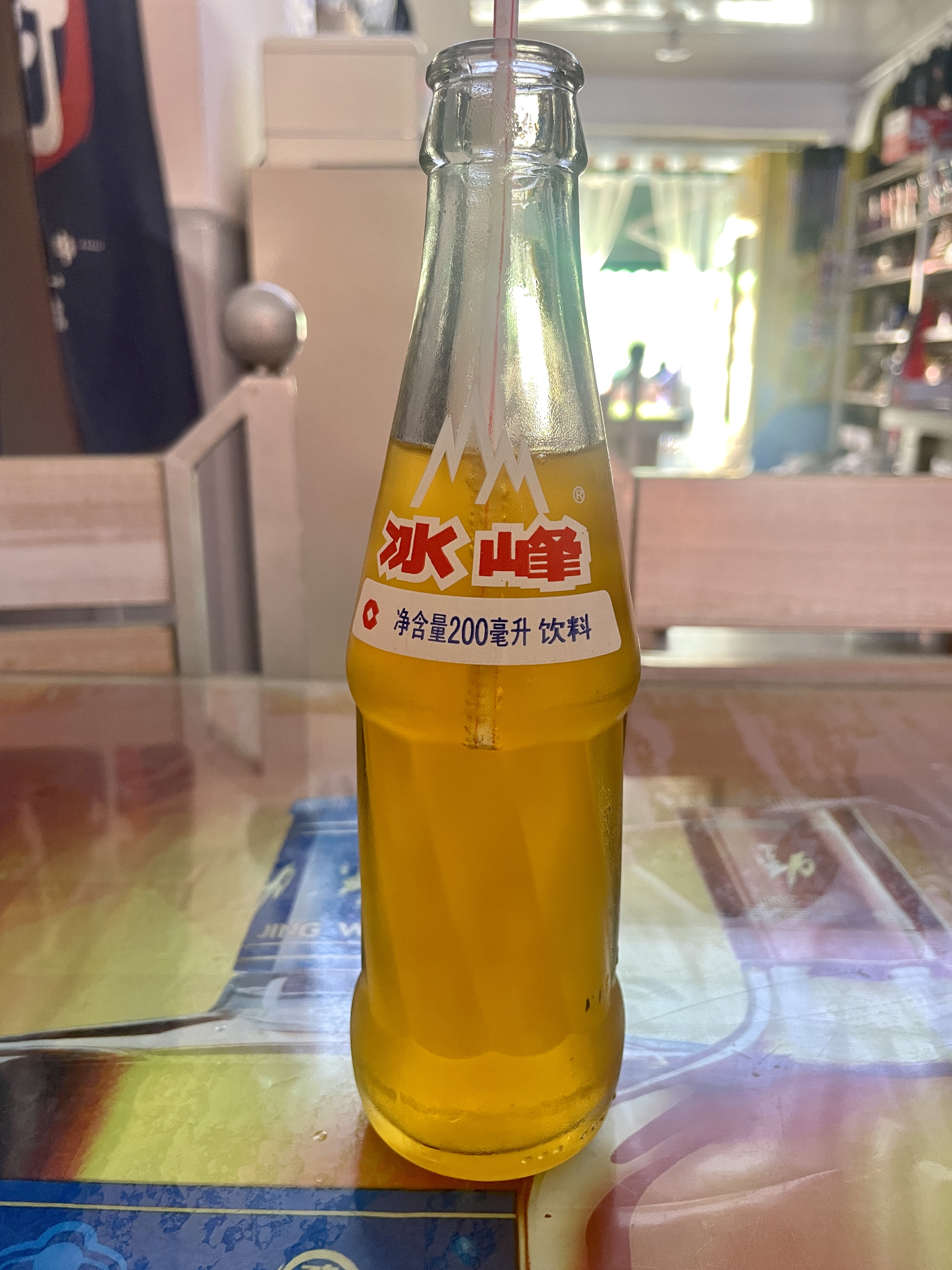
A bottle of Ice Peak

Ice Peak (Chinese: 冰峰; pinyin: Bīngfēng) is a brand of orange flavored soda produced by Xi'an Futian Foods in Xi'an, Shaanxi Province, China. It is usually consumed with other Shaanxi specialties such as paomo or youpo noodles. Together with roujiamo sandwich and liangpi, it constitutes a popular set meal called the "Sanqin set meal (三秦套餐)". The drink is served in most Shaanxi restaurants in China and abroad.

Ice Peak was invented in 1953.

== See also ==
- Jianlibao Group
