= Noodles with tomato egg sauce =

Chinese dish

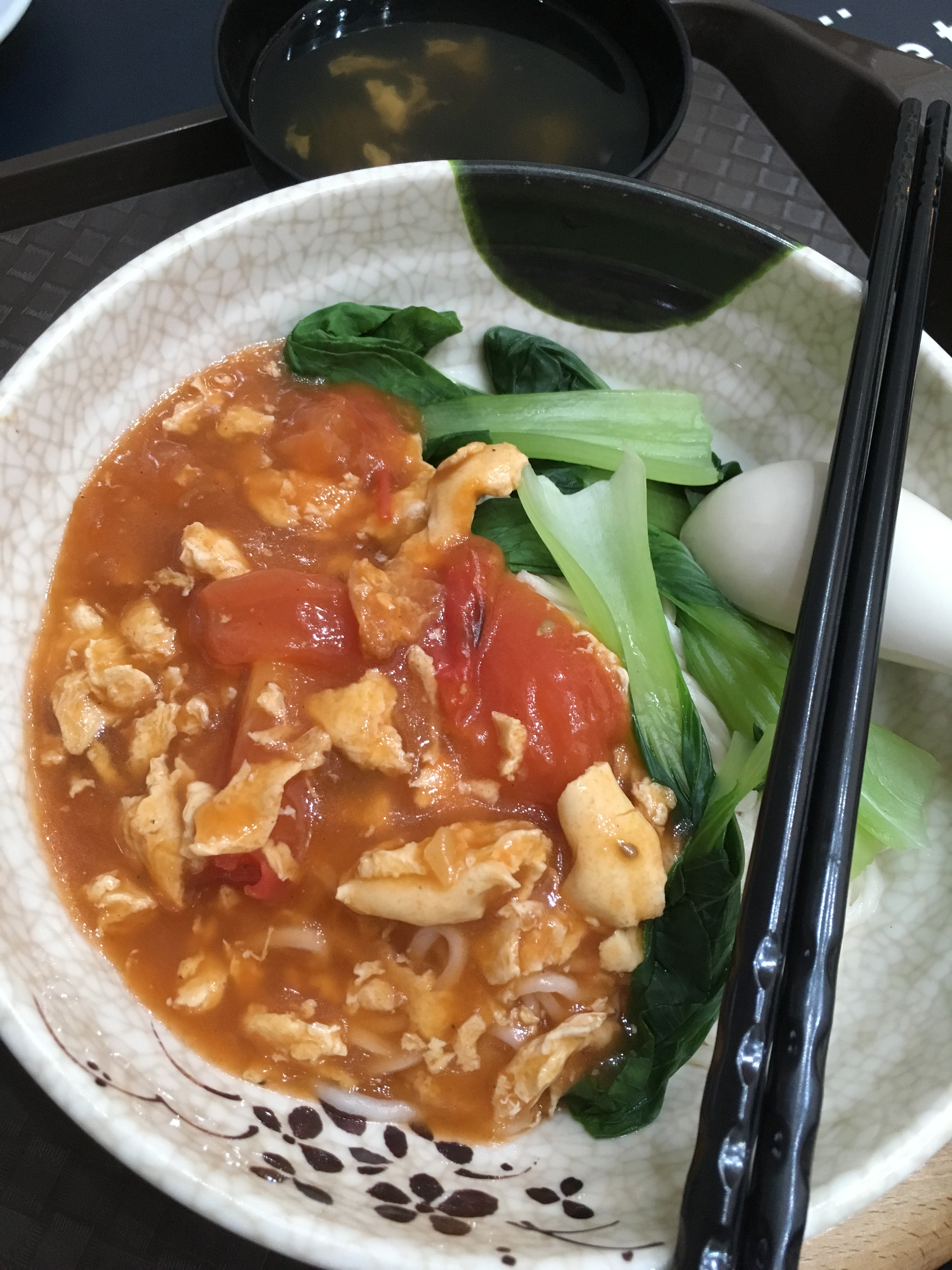
- Noodles with tomato egg sauce
- Type: Noodle
- Region or state: China, Southeast Asia
- Main ingredients: Tomato, Scrambled egg, vegetables, Chinese noodles

Noodles with tomato egg sauce
- Traditional Chinese: 西紅柿雞蛋麵
- Simplified Chinese: 西红柿鸡蛋面
Transcriptions
Standard Mandarin
- Hanyu Pinyin: xīhóngshì jīdànmiàn

Alternative Chinese name
- Traditional Chinese: 番茄雞蛋麵
- Simplified Chinese: 番茄鸡蛋面
Transcriptions
Standard Mandarin
- Hanyu Pinyin: fānqié jīdànmiàn

Noodles with tomato egg sauce (Chinese: 西红柿鸡蛋面/番茄鸡蛋面) is a traditional Chinese dish consisting of three main ingredients: noodles, tomato and egg.

All the three ingredients are common in daily life, so noodles with tomato egg sauce is very popular with people in China. Besides these three main ingredients, other vegetables or condiments can also be added into this soup, such as onions, cucumbers, carrots and ginger.

== See also ==
- List of Chinese dishes
- List of noodle dishes
- Stir-fried tomato and scrambled eggs
