= Stir-fried tomato and scrambled eggs =

Common Chinese dish

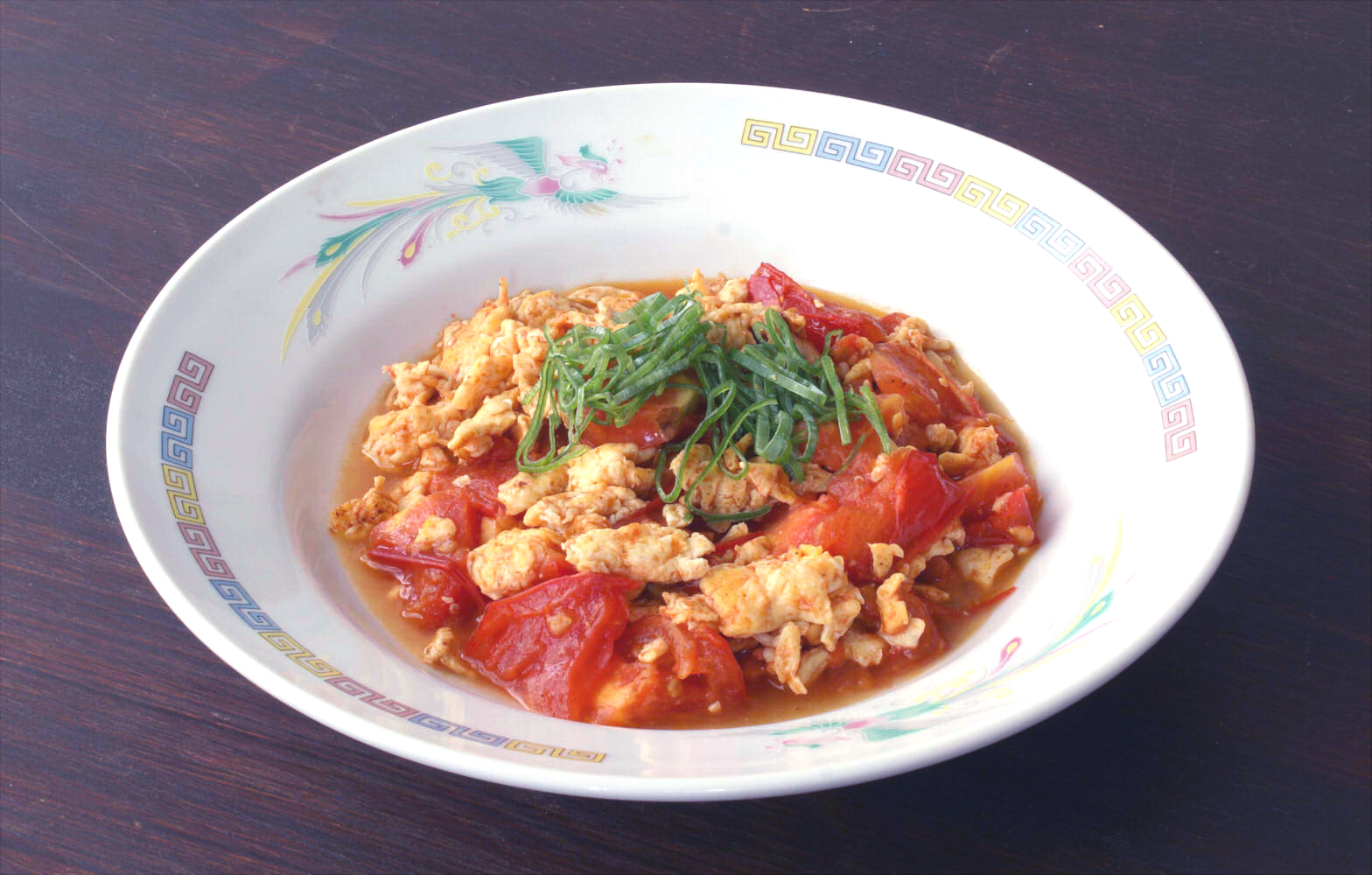
- Place of origin: China
- Serving temperature: Hot
- Main ingredients: Egg, tomato, salt, sugar, oil

Stir-fried tomato and scrambled eggs
- Chinese: 番茄炒蛋
Transcriptions
Standard Mandarin
- Hanyu Pinyin: fānqié chǎo dàn
Yue: Cantonese
- Yale Romanization: fāan kèh cháau dáan

Alternative Chinese name
- Simplified Chinese: 西红柿炒鸡蛋
- Traditional Chinese: 西紅柿炒雞蛋
Transcriptions
Standard Mandarin
- Hanyu Pinyin: xīhóngshì chǎo jīdàn
Yue: Cantonese
- Yale Romanization: sāi hùhng chíh cháau gāi daahn

Stir-fried tomato and scrambled eggs (Chinese: 番茄炒蛋/番茄炒鸡蛋/西紅柿炒雞蛋) is a common household dish in China. It is usually served as a main course. The dish is popular especially due to its simple preparation and widely available ingredients.

Shakshouka (Arabic: شكشوكة) is a similar dish eaten in the Levant of the Middle East, with eggs and tomatoes being the major ingredients.

Another similar dish in the Philippines is ginisang kamatis at itlog, often served during breakfast, and paired with garlic fried rice, or sandwiched between sliced pandesal.

== History ==
Scrambled eggs have been eaten in China for thousands of years but cooking them with tomatoes is a result of mixing Chinese and Western cuisine. Western restaurants using tomatoes in their cuisine began to appear in China during the late Qing Dynasty and early Republican era, influencing Chinese to experiment with tomatoes in cooking. This was particularly prominent around Shanghai, which was the most cosmopolitan Chinese city at the time. In the 1920s and 1930s, stir-fried tomato and scrambled eggs was sold at restaurants. It was around the 1940s that records of the home-cooked style stir-fried tomato and scrambled egg dish emerged.

== Preparation ==
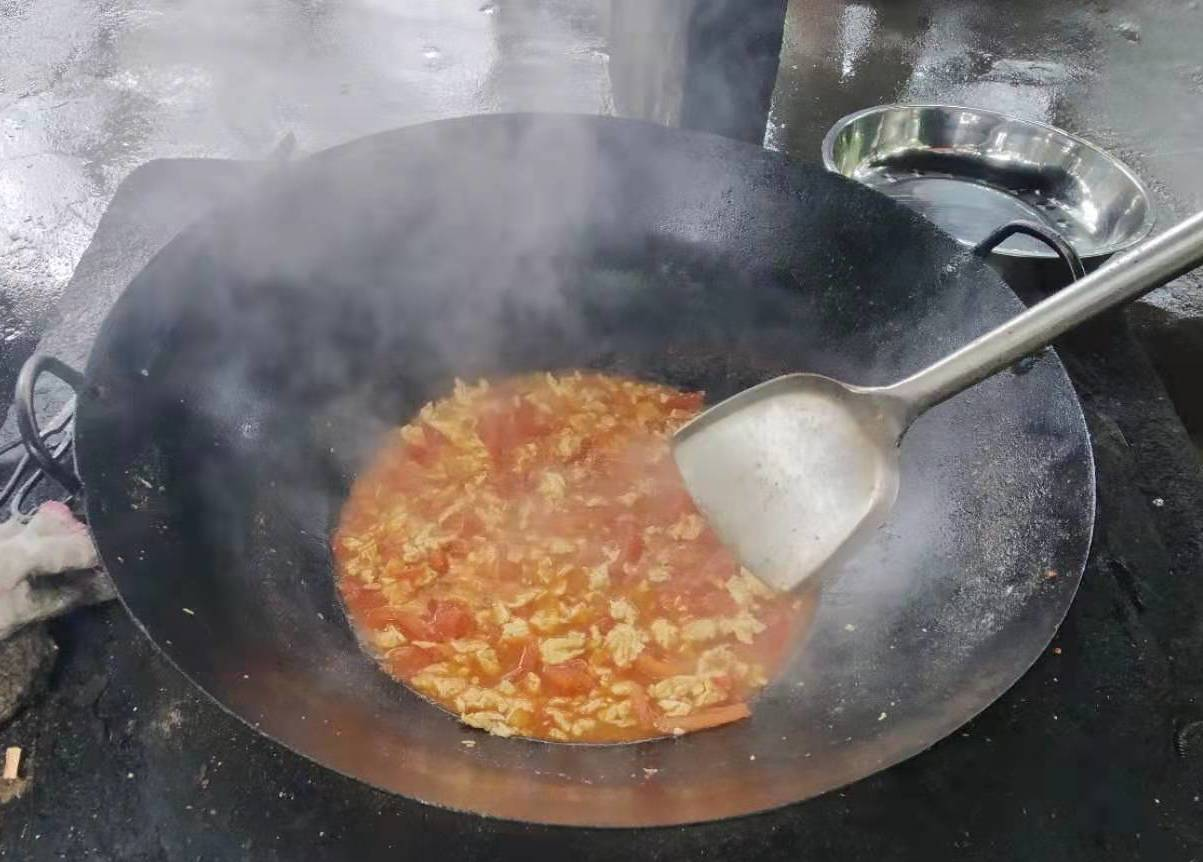
Cooking the dish

Typically, the eggs are first beaten and slightly undercooked in a hot pan, while tomatoes wedges are sautéed in a separate pan to release their juices. Once the tomatoes are softened, the eggs are added into the same pan and stirred-fried with the tomatoes until they are fully set but still moist and soft.

In Francis Lam's recipe published in The New York Times, the eggs are first cooked, then set aside as the tomatoes are cooked. Finally, the eggs are added back to the heat with the tomatoes, and they are stirred together until combined and fully cooked.

Alternatively, as in J. Kenji López-Alt's version of the dish, the tomatoes are stir fried first for approximately two minutes and salted. The eggs are added to the heat next, and the dish is cooked until done to taste.

Some versions of the dish include ketchup.

== See also ==
- List of egg dishes
- List of tomato dishes
- Noodles with tomato egg sauce
- Omelette
