= Youxuan =

Traditional food in Jinan, China

Youxuan (Chinese: 油旋; pinyin: yóuxuán; "oily spiral") is a traditional Chinese pancake in Jinan. It is the special local food of Jinan. Because of its shape like a spiral, the surface of oil was golden yellow, hence the name youxuan. It was created during the Qing dynasty.

== History ==
Youxuan was created at the Qing dynasty. There were three brothers went to South China and ate the sweet youxuan. When they returned to Jinan, they modified the recipe to make it savoury, and created the Jinan youxuan.

Phoenix in Jinan was the early shop to sell the youxuan. The Phoenix sold the youxuan in the Daoguang era, and it was famous in Jinan by selling the local food of Jinan.

In the Guangxu twenty years, the "Wen Sheng Park" restaurant was opened to sell youxuan and many other local snacks in Jinan.

== Development ==
In the Republic of China, youxuan was famous in China and had more than a dozen shops selling youxuan in Jinan.

When Mao Zedong went to Jinan, he ordered youxuan from the Jufengde, a traditional restaurant with 70 years of history. Youxuan is the signature dish of Jufengde.

Now, there are only several people who have the ability to make authentic you xuan. Most people have forgotten the famous food you xuan. It is a very hard time for the people who make lives by selling the you xuan.

== Famous restaurants ==
=== Hong Chun Mei Zhai ===
Hong Chun Mei Zhai has been granted Intangible Cultural Heritage status of Shandong Province.

=== Youxuan Zhang ===
It has the inscription from Ji Xianlin that Soft crisp, youxuan Zhang.

=== Su’s youxuan ===
8 process "step by step carefully", 60 layers of pastry are indispensable. Su Jianglin studied how to make youxuan in Jufengde. He represented Shandong Province to join the Famous Snack Show of China.
