= Dry pot chicken =

Chinese chicken dish

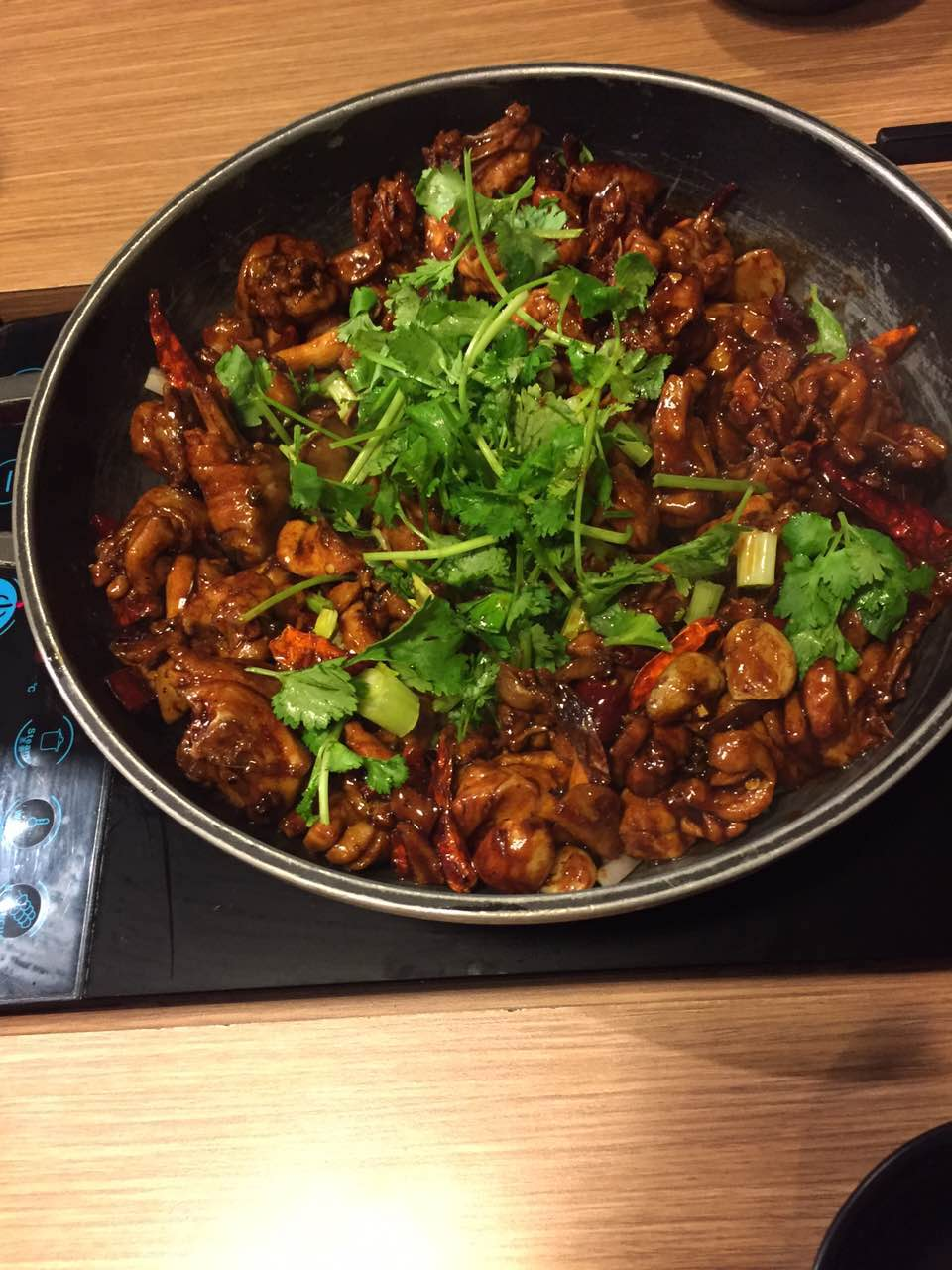
Dry pot chicken

Dry pot chicken, also referred as hot pot chicken, 鸡爆 - jī bào or 干锅鸡 - gān guō jī, is a dish served as a dry hot pot, cooked with chili pepper, garlic and chicken, by fast frying the chicken in oil.

Dry pot chicken is but one type of hot pot dish. The seasoning, ingredients and cooking methods are similar to the more common "wet" hot pots, but dry hot pots do not have the soup base.

== Origin ==
There are two main theories regarding the origins of dry pot chicken.

1. The dry hot pot chicken's origin traces back to Guizhou people's eating habits. It first appeared among the Miao ethnic people. They dug a small round pit in their yard where they placed firewood and charcoal. In the center of the pit, they put a stone or clay pot on the top of the wood. This is the so-called “fire pot", which was the prototype of dry hot pot chicken.
2. Dry hot pot derives from the northern area of Sichuan province. While most dry pot chicken restaurant owners consider Chongqing as the origin of this dish, they also claim that what matters most is which place really popularized dry pot chicken.

Dry hot pot dishes began to spread throughout China as rural Sichuan people migrated mainly to the south-east of China to find employment, taking with them about their traditional home town dishes.
