= Su-style noodles =

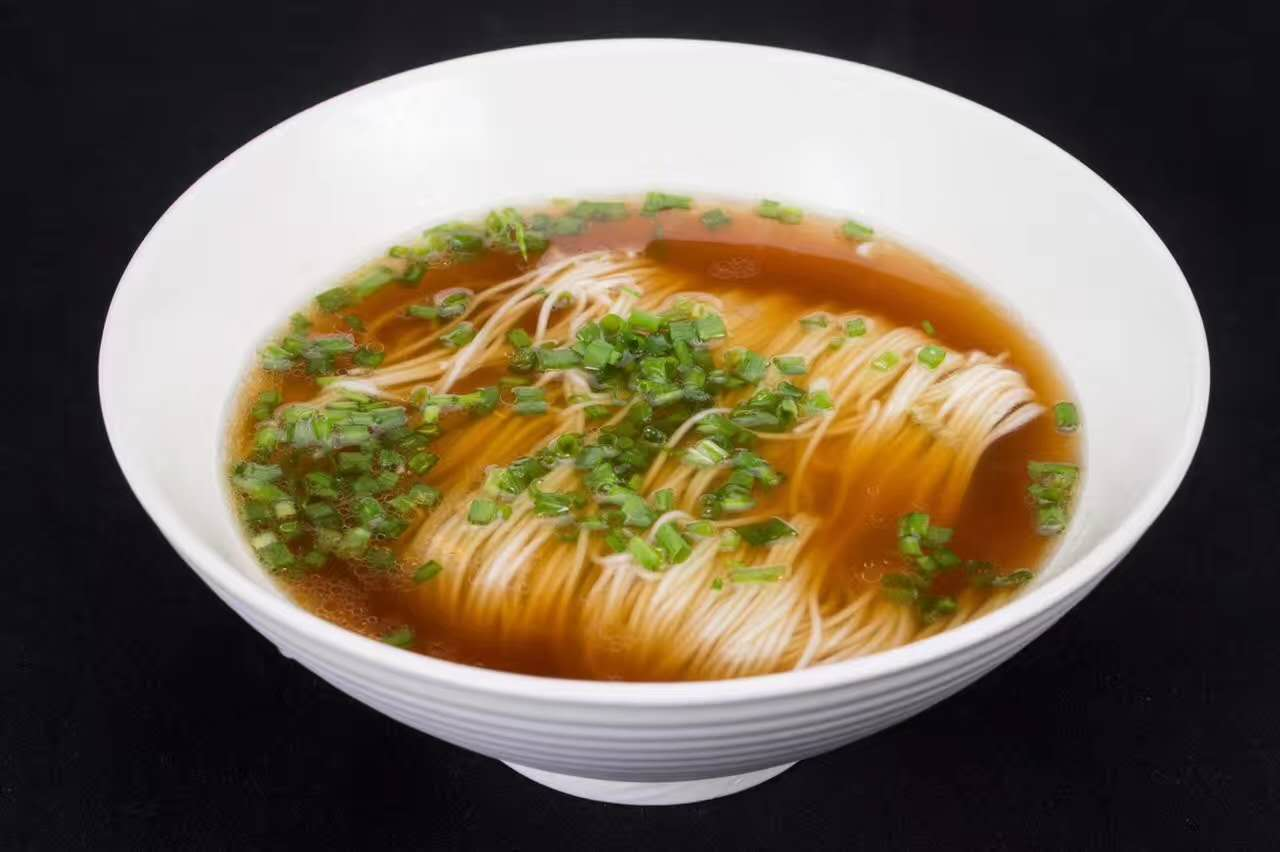
Su-style Noodle

Su-style noodle (苏式汤面) is a dish in Suzhou, China that combines soup, noodles, and toppings.

== Components ==
There are two types of soup for Su-style noodles: white and red. Both types start with a slowly cooked base soup. Recipes differ across restaurants: it can be eel bone, green shell snail, pork bone, chicken, pork, or ham. Brine is added to the base soup at a ratio of 10:1. The addition of soy sauce transforms white soup into red soup. This step is called "open soup" in the industry.

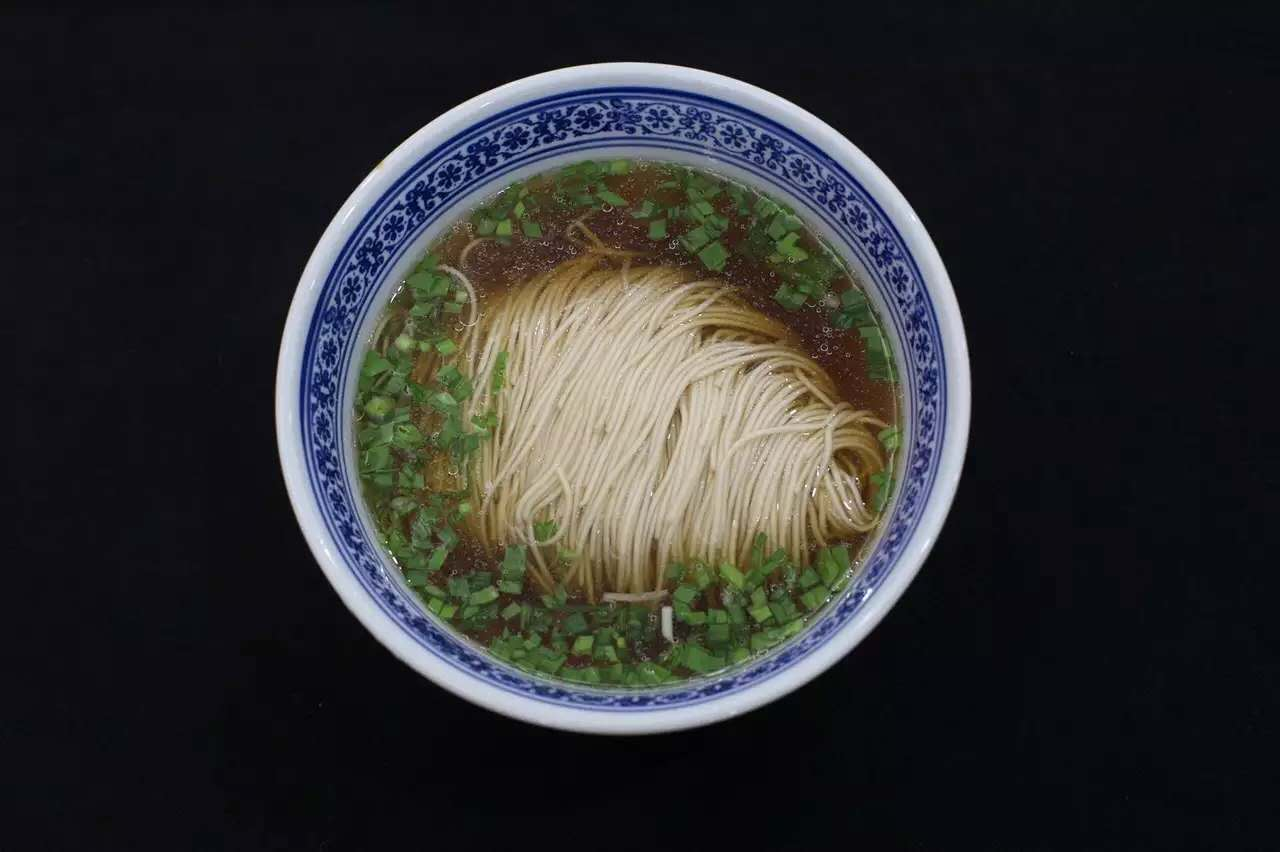
Su-style noodle with red soup

Noodles become increasingly soft as they cook. How firm they should be is chosen by the customer or cook.

Toppings almost cover the recipe of the Su Bang cuisine, such as Zhu Hongxing's stuffed hoof, Wufangzhai's five-spice ribs, Songhelou's braised duck, Huang Tianyuan's eel, and common braised eel meat, stir-fried meat, pork ribs, shrimps, stir-fried vegetarian with hot sauce, and more.

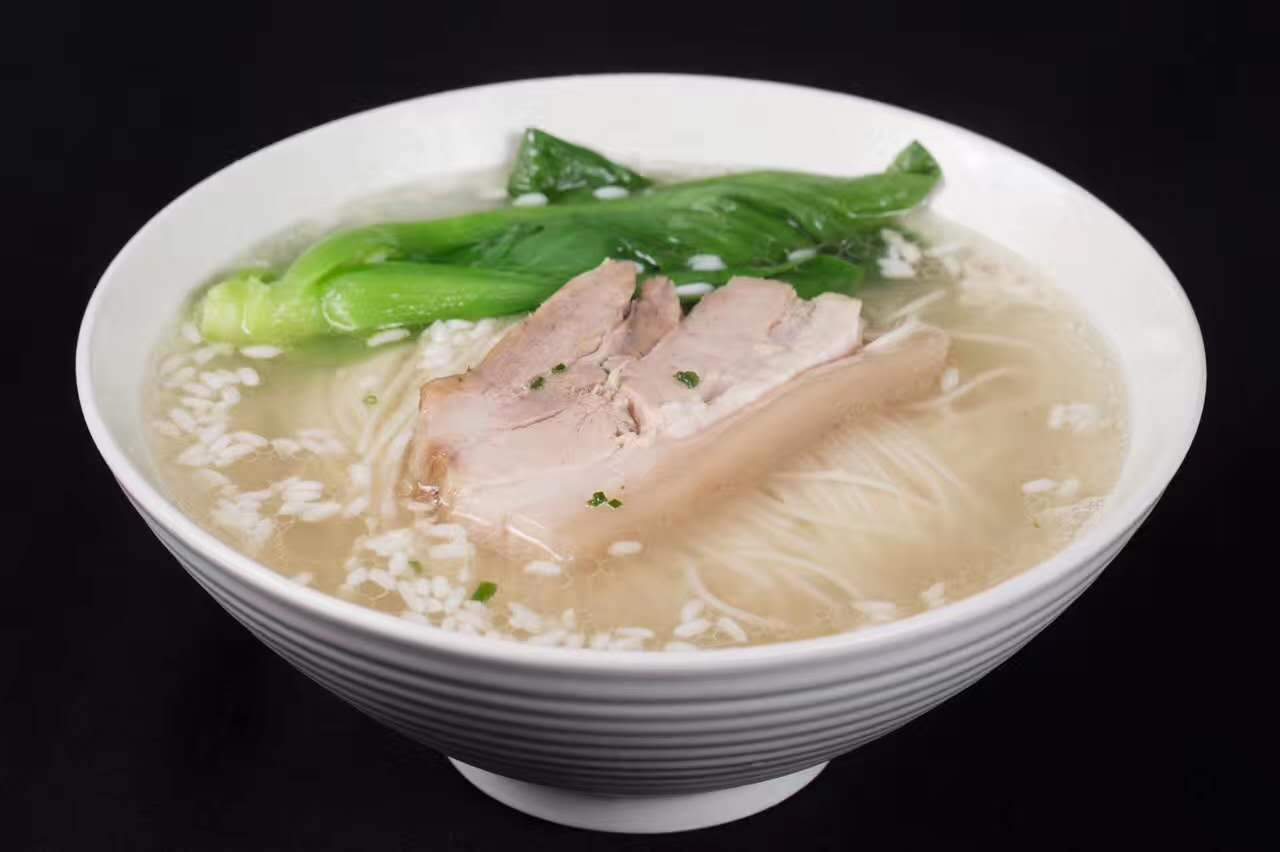
Maple Town Noodle

== Location ==
Su-style noodle is only popular among Yangtze River Delta due to its high cost and toppings are mostly made from local ingredients.

=== Maple Town Noodle ===
Maple Town Noodle is a famous food of Jiangsu Maple Town. It is popularly regarded as the most tasty type, and the most difficult to make. After a series of steps such as plucking and cleaning, pork belly is added. It takes 4 1/2 hours to cook the noodle and the soup is made of fresh ingredients like eel bone, shrimp brain, snail meat etc. The soup of Maple Town Noodle is always white soup.

== See also ==
- List of noodle dishes
