= Liangpi =

Chinese noodle-like dish

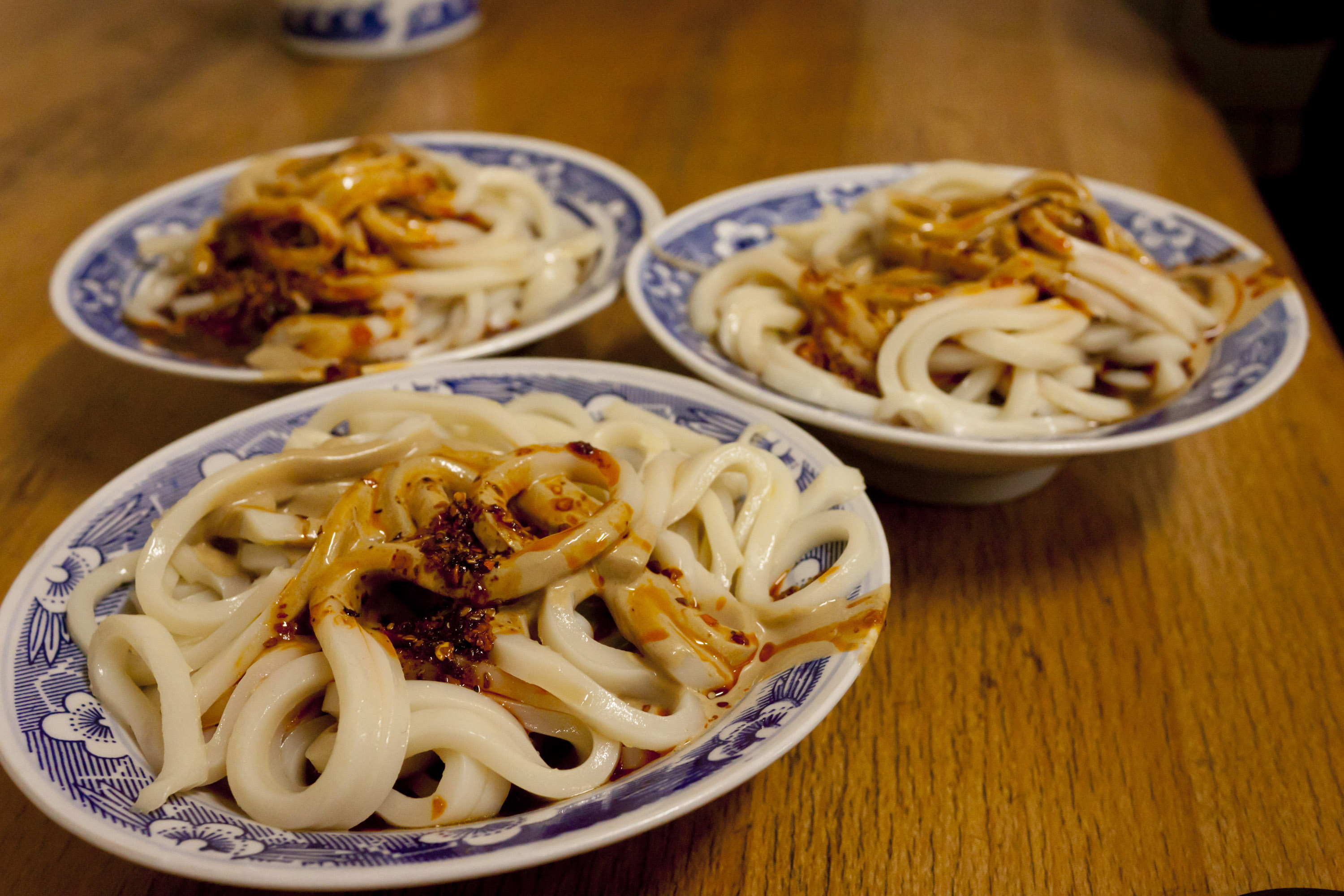
- Liangpi
- Traditional Chinese: 涼皮
- Simplified Chinese: 凉皮
Transcriptions
Standard Mandarin
- Hanyu Pinyin: liángpí

Liangpi (simplified Chinese: 凉皮; traditional Chinese: 涼皮; pinyin: liángpí; lit. 'cold skin') is a Chinese dish composed of cold noodles made from wheat or rice flour. It is a specialty dish originating from Xi'an and forms part of the cuisine of Shaanxi Province, but has now spread throughout China. In northwestern areas of China, it is often called liangpi zi (凉皮子). While Liangpi can be eaten year-round, it is consumed by more people during the summer.

== History ==
During the reign of Qin Shi Huang, each village and county had to pay tribute to the court every year. The annual tribute item in Shaanxi Province was rice. Here, people produced the most quality and delicious japonica rice at that time. However, because of a severe drought, the peasants could not bring grain to the imperial court. So the people went to a local squire for help and advice. After thoughtful consideration, the squire decided to use the old rice left over from the first year to make a tribute to the court. They soaked the old rice overnight, and then ground it into a slurry with stone, after precipitation, they filtered the rice milk and steamed it on the steamer. After cooking, people tasted the cooled rice skin and felt full of praise. The texture was smooth, tender, and fragrant.

After that, people used seasonings on the cold skin noodles, including chili, vinegar, sesame, salt, and soy sauce, which eventually became known as liangpi. Later, people offered liangpi as a tribute to Qin Shi Huang. After taking a bite, Qin Shi Huang felt the hot and sour taste refreshing, tender and smooth, and very delicious, so he decided to take Shaanxi Liangpi as an annual royal tribute. Since then, liangpi has become popular in the province, and has become a unique Shaanxi snack.

== Preparation ==
Liangpi means cold skin noodles. It contains no animal products. There are several ways of making liangpi:

First, wheat or rice flour is turned into a soft dough by adding water and a little salt. Then, the dough is put in a bowl, water is added and the dough has to be "rinsed" until the water is saturated with starch from the dough, turning into a muddy white color. The remainder of the dough is now removed, and the bowl is left to rest overnight at a cool place to allow the dissolved starch to precipitate.

The following day, there will be a kind of starch paste on the bottom of the bowl, with a more or less clear liquid on top, which has to be discarded. Once the liquid has been removed, a small amount of the paste can then be poured into a flat plate or tray and spread evenly in a thin layer. The whole plate is placed into a large pot full of boiling water, where it is steamed for a couple of minutes, and the resulting "pancake" is cut into long pieces vaguely resembling noodles.

== Types ==
=== Mianjin liangpi (Gluten Liangpi) ===
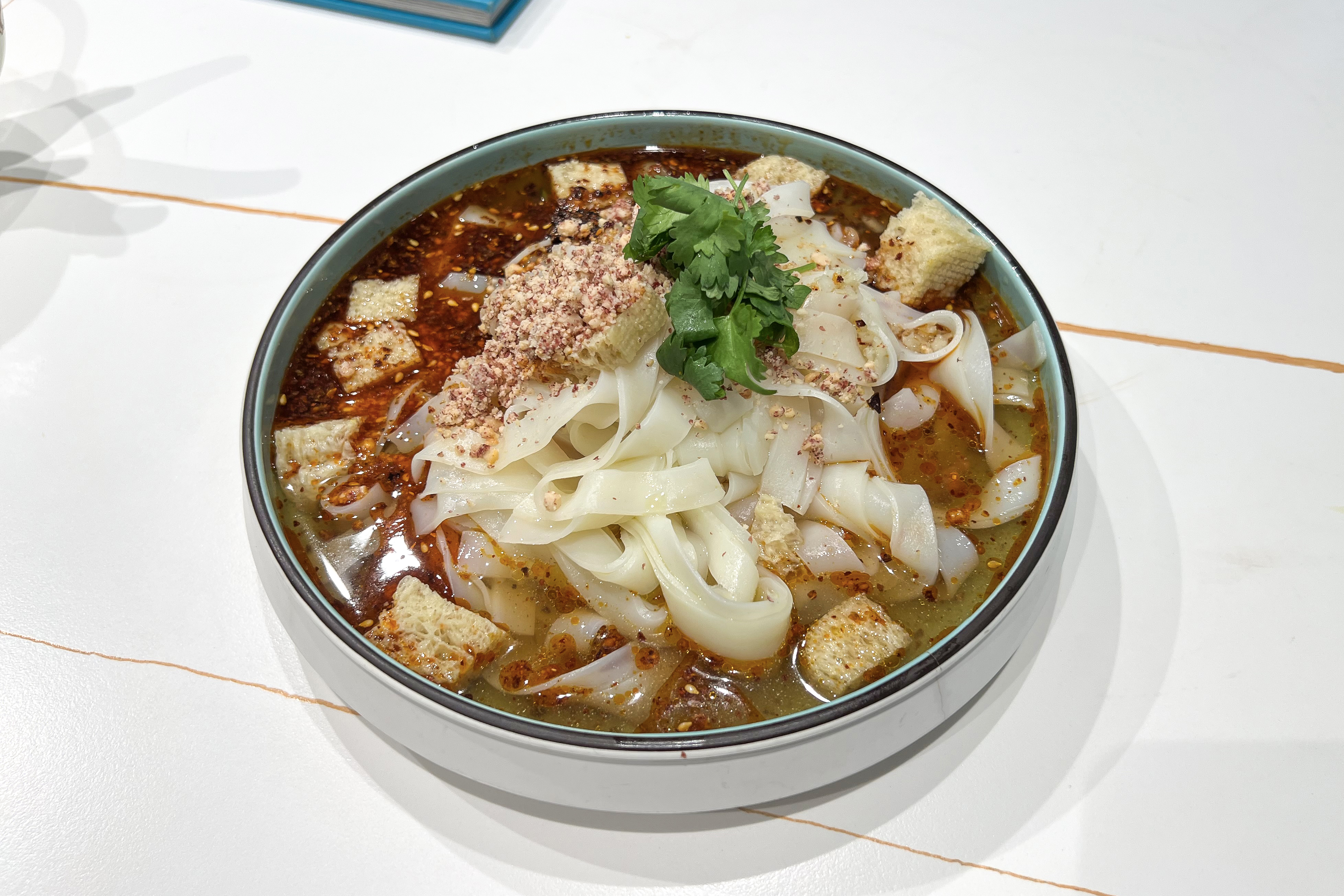
Mianjin liangpi

Mianjin liangpi (simplified Chinese: 面筋凉皮)is popular in the Guanzhong area, with gluten as the main auxiliary material. When mixing, gluten blocks and seasonal vegetables must be added; Condiments include vinegar, sauce, garlic juice, MSG, salt, spicy oil, sesame oil, and so on.

=== Qinzhen liangpi (Qin town Liangpi) ===
Because it is produced in Qin Town, Qinzhen liangpi is also called Qin Town liangpi. The seasoning is less, and the focus is chili oil (the production is more exquisite, and the chili powder is added to the aniseed such as Sichuan pepper and fennel, and the heat is repeatedly boiled in the superior oil, without pepper particles). In May 2007, the production technique of Qinzhen liangpi was included in the first batch of the intangible cultural heritage list of Shaanxi Province.

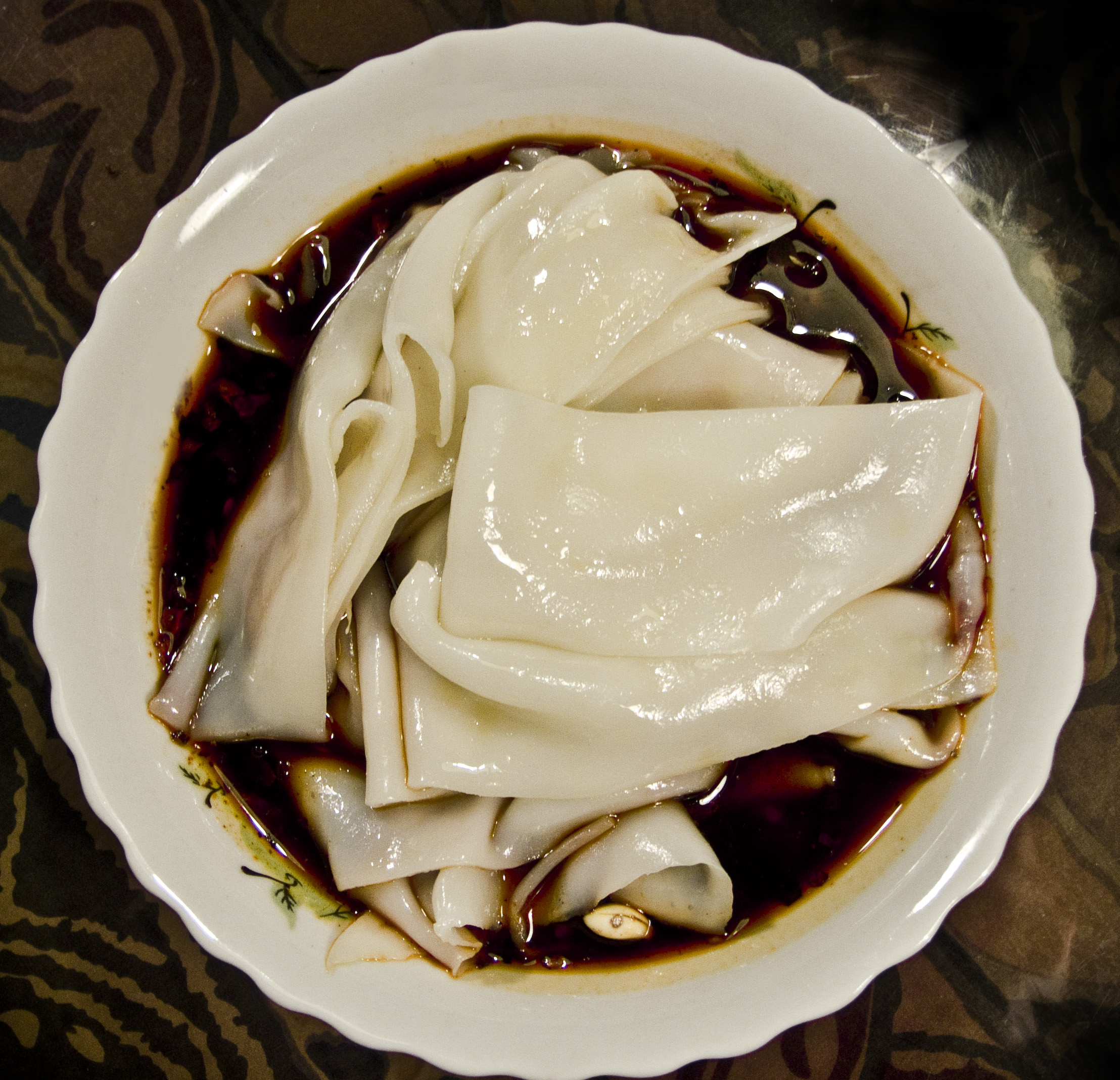
Hanzhong mian pi

=== Hanzhong liangpi ===
Hanzhong liangpi (simplified Chinese: 汉中凉皮; traditional Chinese: 漢中涼皮; pinyin: Hànzhōng liángpí) or Hanzhong mini (simplified Chinese: 汉中面皮; traditional Chinese: 漢中面皮; pinyin: Hànzhōng miànpí), named for the city of Hanzhong in southwestern Shaanxi, are steamed liangpi with garlic and hot chili oil. Unlike other places, it is often served hot rather than cold.

=== Majiang liangpi ===
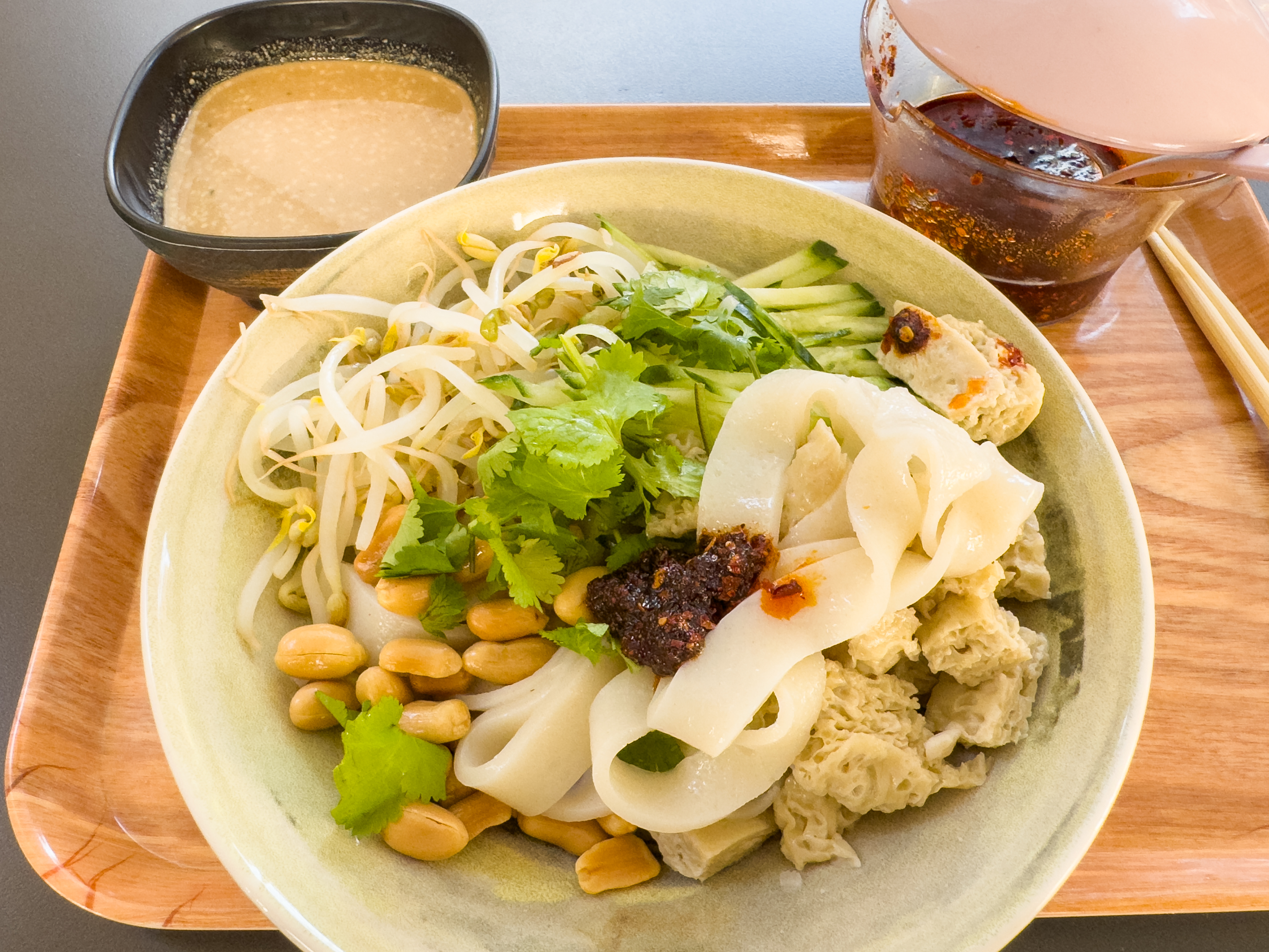
Majiang liangpi. Sesame paste is in a bowl (upper left).

Majiang liangpi (simplified Chinese: 麻酱凉皮; traditional Chinese: 麻醬涼皮; pinyin: Májiàng liángpí) are liangpi garnished with julienned cucumber and a sauce made of salt, vinegar, hot chili oil and especially Chinese sesame paste, for which it is named (simplified Chinese: 麻酱; traditional Chinese: 麻醬; pinyin: Májiàng).

=== Qishan, Shaanxi gan mianpi ===
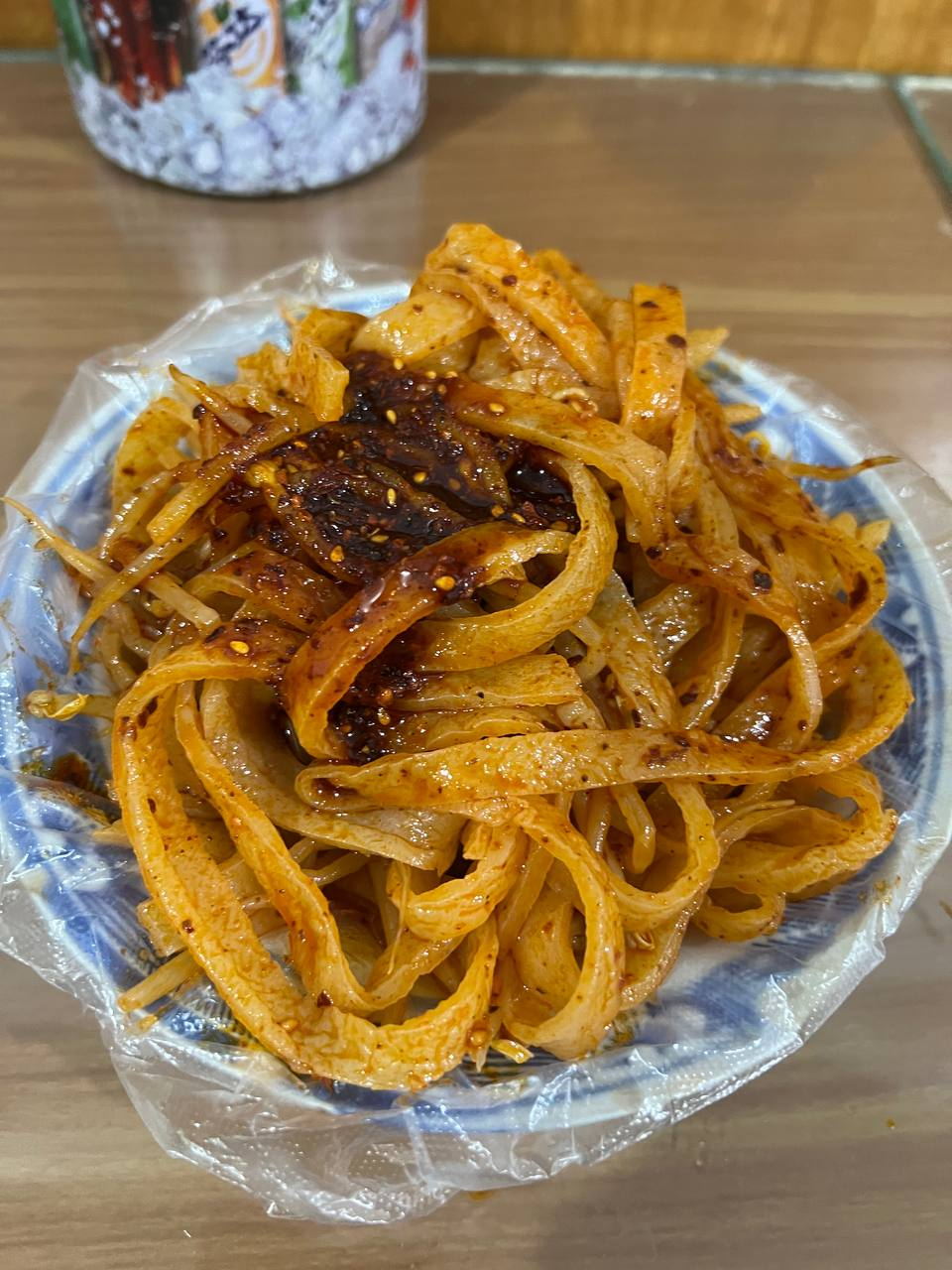
Gan Mianpi

Shaanxi gan mianpi (陕西岐山擀面皮 is another type of liangpi that tastes a bit firmer and looks darker in color compared to other liangpi. The process of making gan mianpi is quite laborious, including several repeated processes to separate gluten and starch by washing the dough in cold water a few times. After washing, mainly gluten is left in the dough, which can be solidified by boiling (called mianjin). The starch water is thickened by boiling as well, and then spread on a pan and further cooked as a pancake.

== See also ==
- Liangfen
- Chinese noodles
- Rice noodles
