= Guokui =

Chinese flatbread

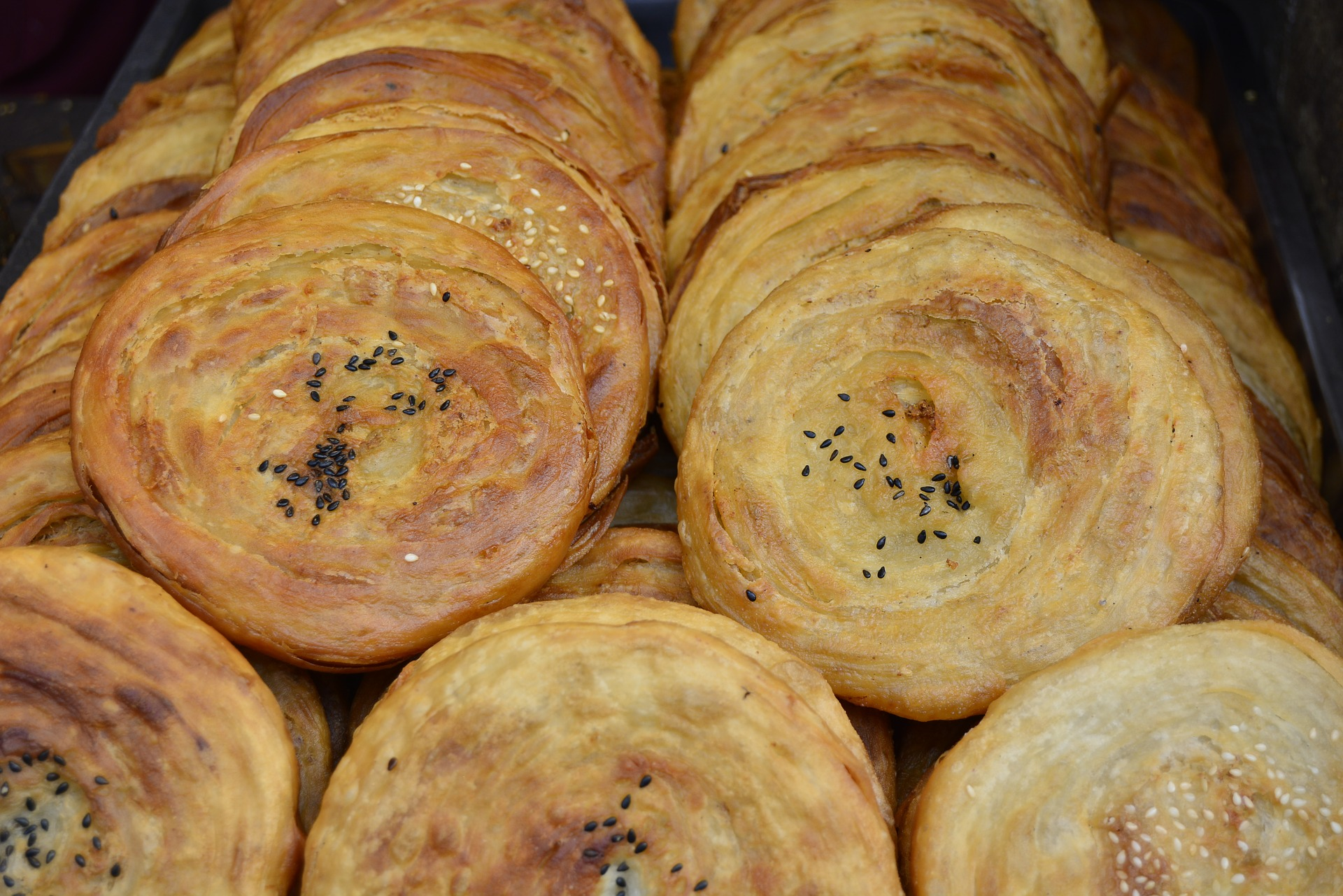
- Guokui from Sichuan
- Place of origin: China
- Region or state: Shaanxi
- Associated cuisine: Shaanxi cuisine
- Main ingredients: Flour, water, yeast, sugar,
- Variations: Chicken, beef

Guokui (traditional Chinese: 鍋盔; simplified Chinese: 锅盔; pinyin: guōkuī), literally "pot helmet", is a kind of bing (flatbread) made from flour originating from Shaanxi cuisine.

== Variations ==
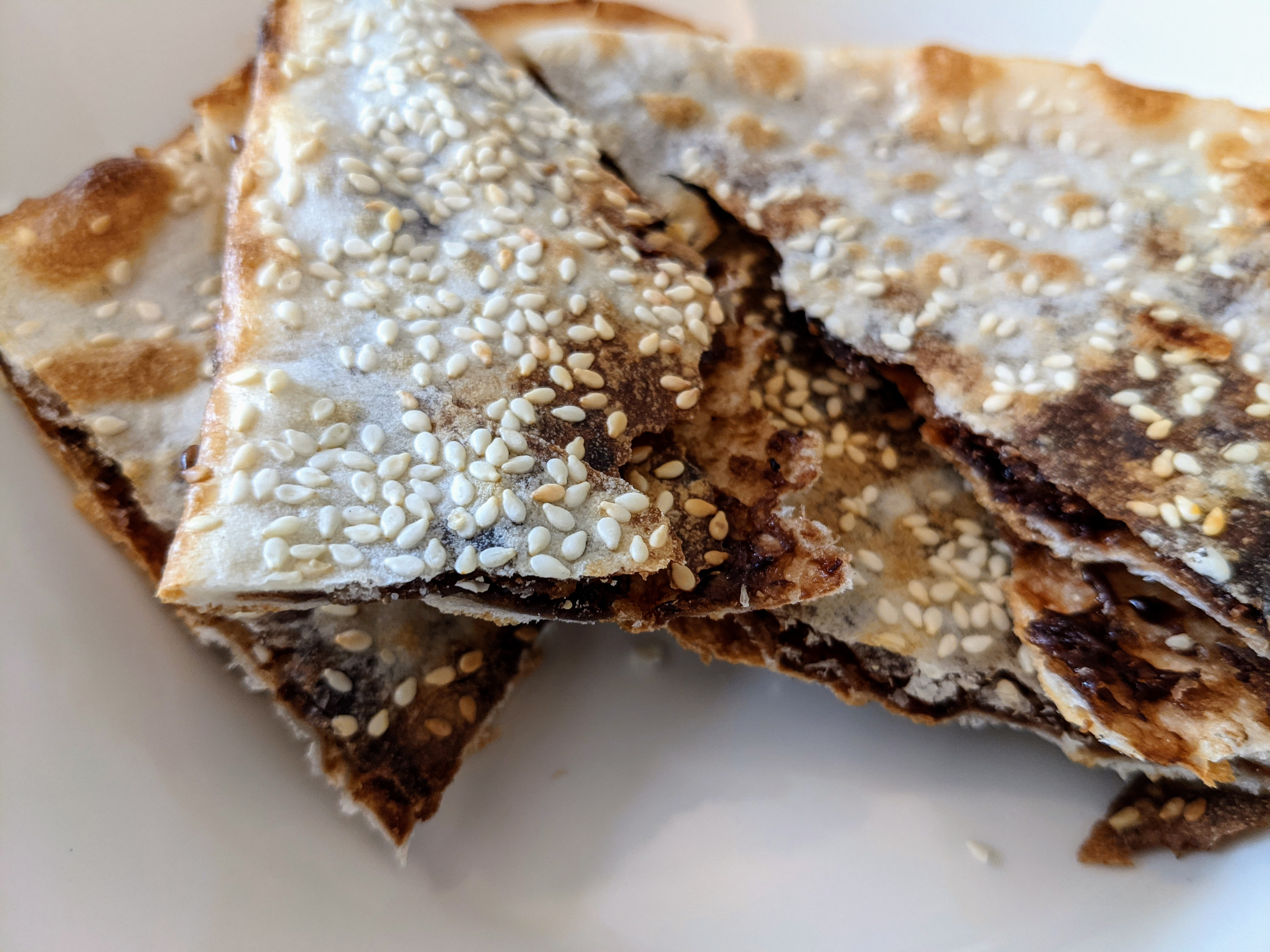
Jingzhou-style guokui with red bean paste

The dish is said to have been invented during the Tang dynasty by a laborer who cooked flatbread in his iron helmet over a wood fire. There are many different versions including Shaanxi, Jingzhou (Hubei), Henan, Sichuan, and Gansu.

=== Jingzhou style ===
Hailing from Jingzhou, Hubei, in this style the dough of flour, water, yeast and sugar is stuffed with either a savoury filling like chicken, beef, and pickled vegetables, or a sweet filling like red bean paste. It is then flattened and cooked until crispy inside a cylindrical charcoal oven. Since the preparation resembles making Indian naan in a tandoor oven, the dish is sometimes called "Chinese naan".

=== Shaanxi style ===
The guokui originated in Shaanxi. In Shaanxi, a guokui is round in shape, about a foot long in diameter, an inch in thickness, and weighs about 2.5 kg. It is traditionally presented as a gift by a grandmother to her grandson when he turns one month old (滿月, a traditional custom among Han Chinese). Along with biang biang noodles, they are considered one of the "Eight/Ten Oddities of Guanzhong".

== Gallery ==
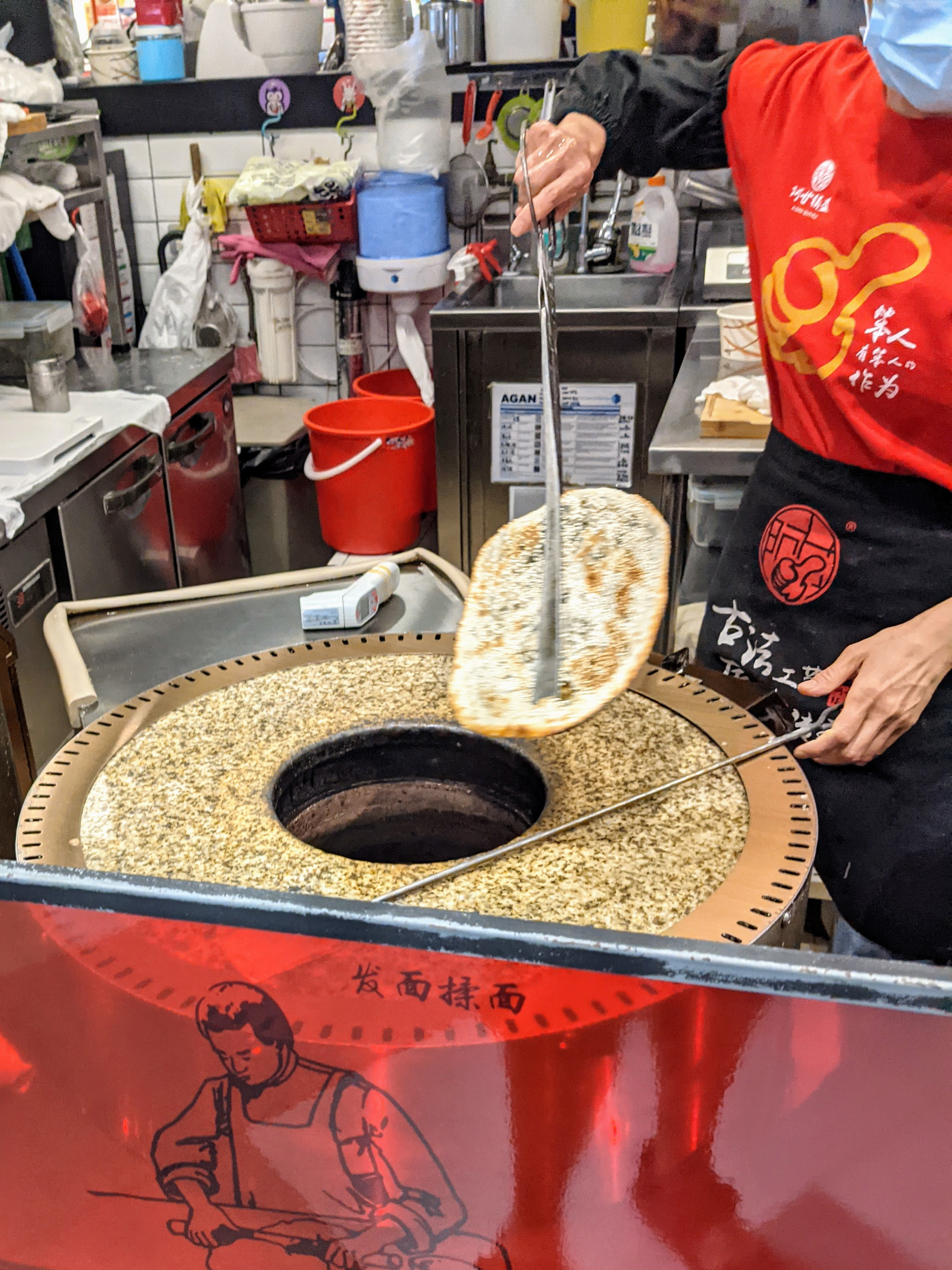
Cooking Jingzhou-style guokui in the traditional cylindrical oven

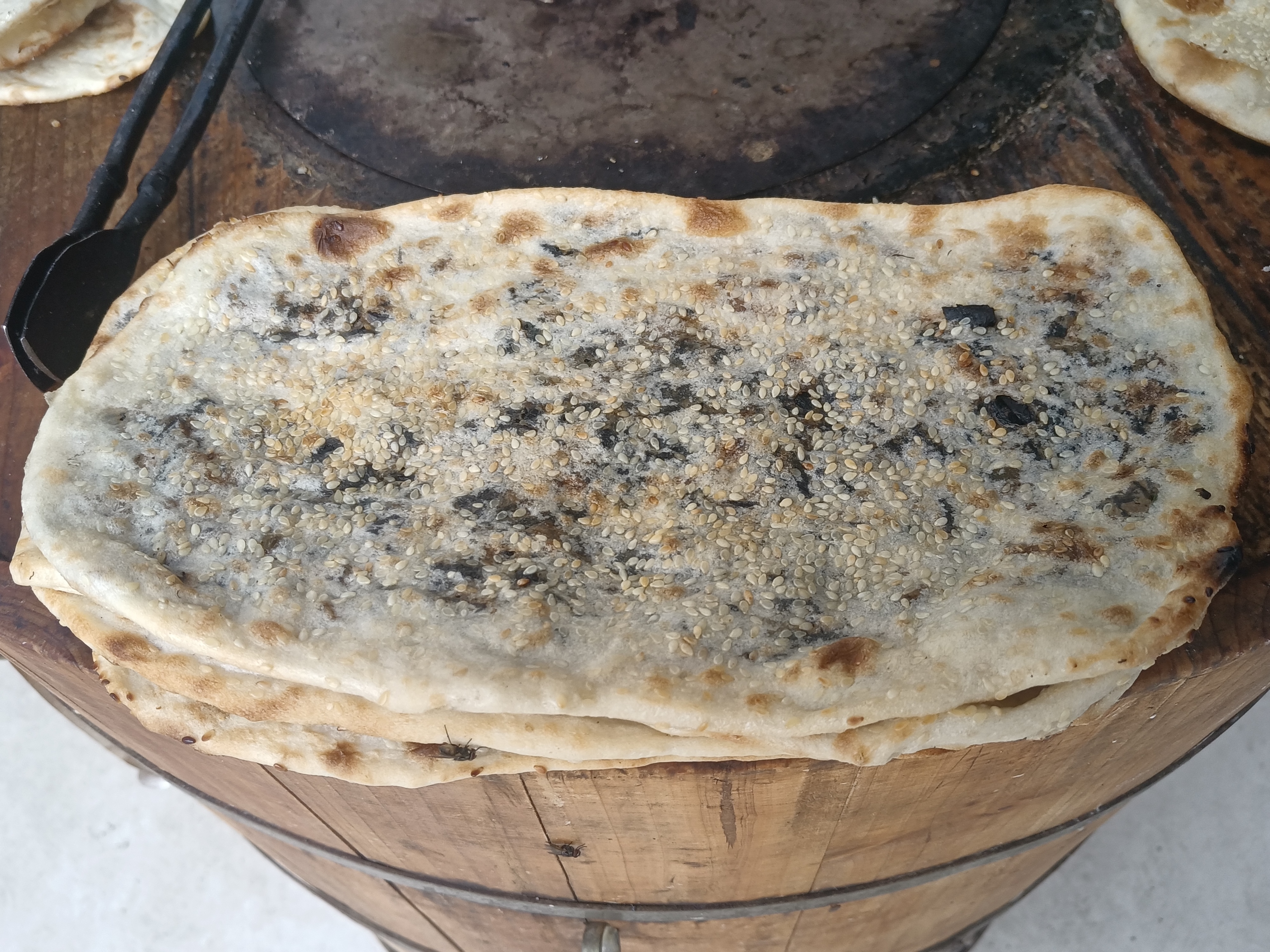
With meigan cai

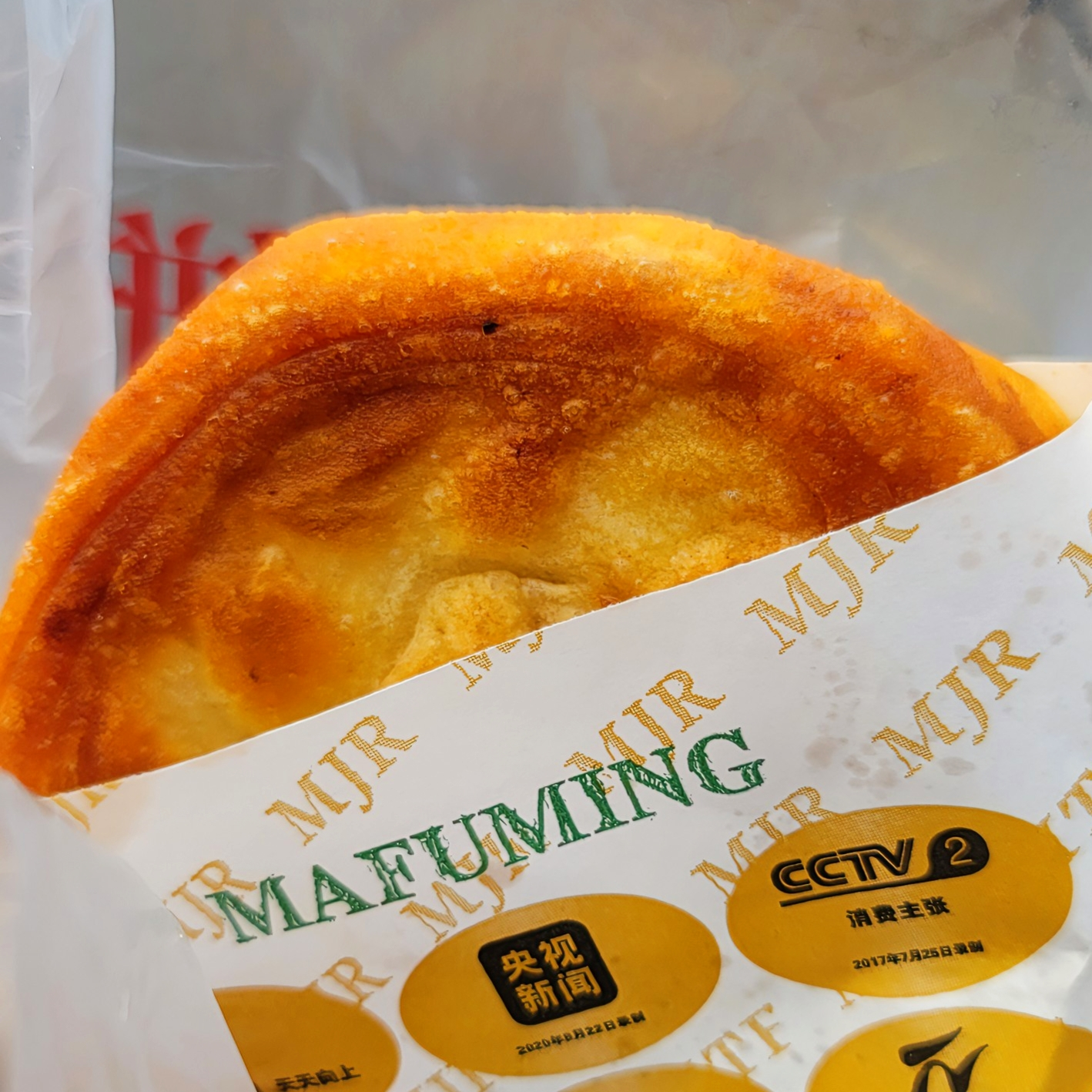
Beef guokui

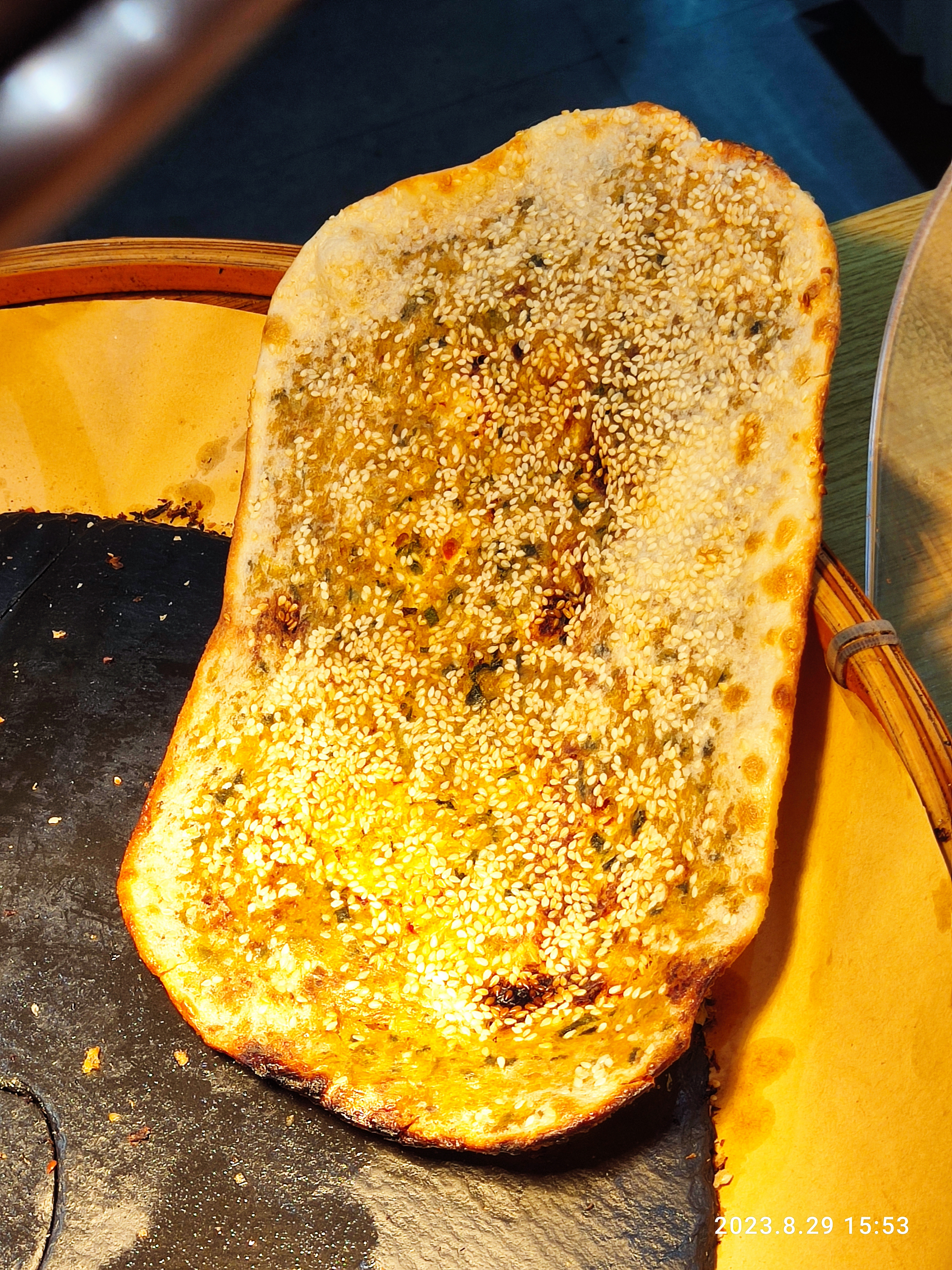

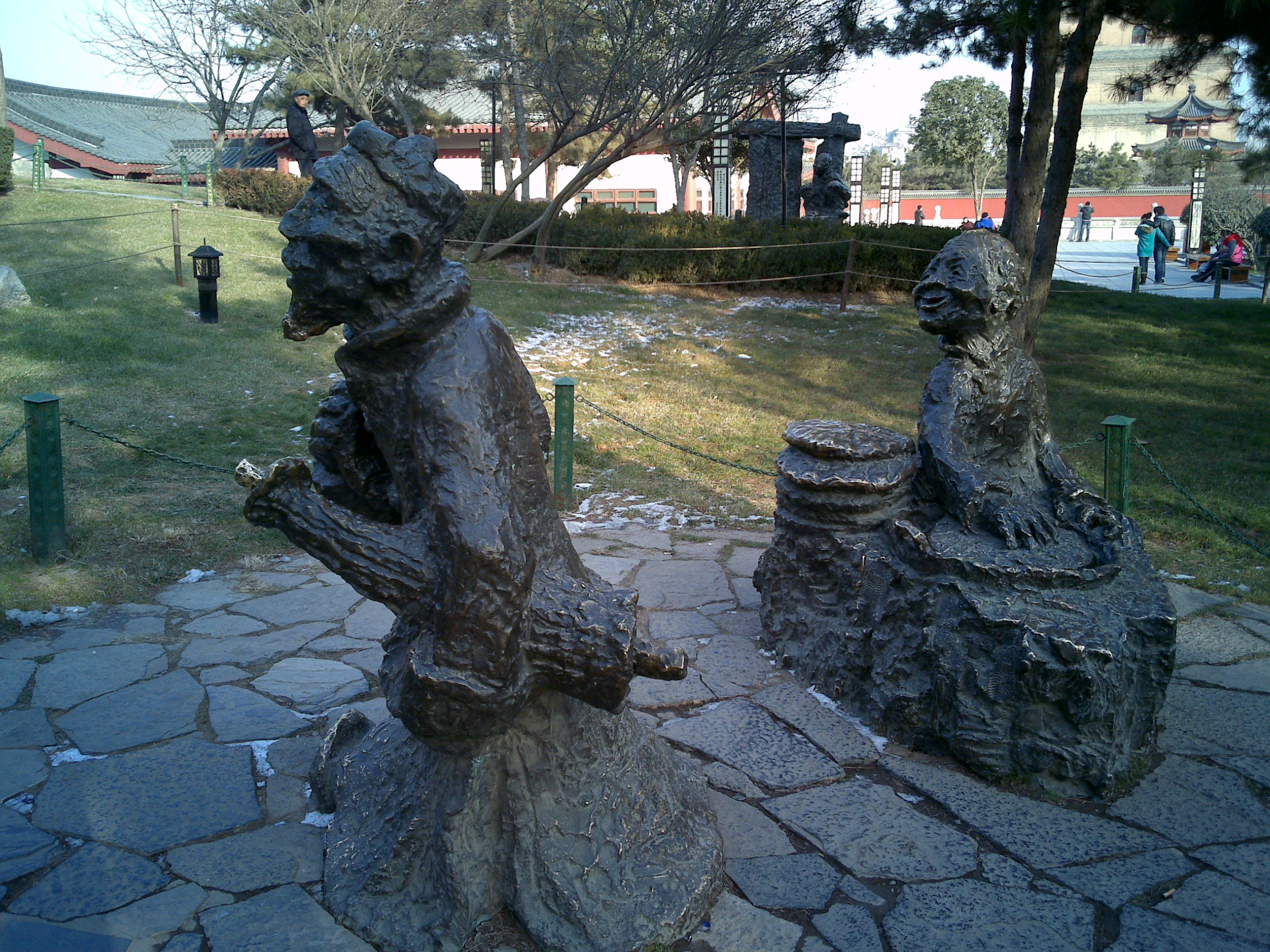
Statue depicting Shaanxi/Guanzhong style Guokui

== See also ==
- List of Chinese dishes
- List of pancakes
