= CJK Unified Ideographs Extension G =

- Range: U+30000..U+3134F (4,944 code points)
- Plane: TIP
- Scripts: Han
- Assigned: 4,939 code points
- Unused: 5 reserved code points

Unicode Version History
- 13.0 (2020): 4,939 (+4,939)

Unicode documentation
- Code chart ∣ Web page

CJK Unified Ideographs Extension G is a Unicode block containing rare and historic CJK Unified Ideographs for Chinese, Japanese, Korean, and Vietnamese which were submitted to the Ideographic Research Group during 2015. It is the first block to be allocated to the Tertiary Ideographic Plane.

The exotic characters 𰻞 biáng and 𱁬 taito are present in this block.

The block has three ideographic variation sequences registered in the Unicode Ideographic Variation Database (IVD). These sequences specify the desired glyph variant for a given Unicode character.

== Block ==
CJK Unified Ideographs Extension G^{[1]}^{[2]} Official Unicode Consortium code chart (PDF)
	0	1	2	3	4	5	6	7	8	9	A	B	C	D	E	F
U+3000x	𰀀	𰀁	𰀂	𰀃	𰀄	𰀅	𰀆	𰀇	𰀈	𰀉	𰀊	𰀋	𰀌	𰀍	𰀎	𰀏
U+3001x	𰀐	𰀑	𰀒	𰀓	𰀔	𰀕	𰀖	𰀗	𰀘	𰀙	𰀚	𰀛	𰀜	𰀝	𰀞	𰀟
U+3002x	𰀠	𰀡	𰀢	𰀣	𰀤	𰀥	𰀦	𰀧	𰀨	𰀩	𰀪	𰀫	𰀬	𰀭	𰀮	𰀯
U+3003x	𰀰	𰀱	𰀲	𰀳	𰀴	𰀵	𰀶	𰀷	𰀸	𰀹	𰀺	𰀻	𰀼	𰀽	𰀾	𰀿
U+3004x	𰁀	𰁁	𰁂	𰁃	𰁄	𰁅	𰁆	𰁇	𰁈	𰁉	𰁊	𰁋	𰁌	𰁍	𰁎	𰁏
U+3005x	𰁐	𰁑	𰁒	𰁓	𰁔	𰁕	𰁖	𰁗	𰁘	𰁙	𰁚	𰁛	𰁜	𰁝	𰁞	𰁟
U+3006x	𰁠	𰁡	𰁢	𰁣	𰁤	𰁥	𰁦	𰁧	𰁨	𰁩	𰁪	𰁫	𰁬	𰁭	𰁮	𰁯
U+3007x	𰁰	𰁱	𰁲	𰁳	𰁴	𰁵	𰁶	𰁷	𰁸	𰁹	𰁺	𰁻	𰁼	𰁽	𰁾	𰁿
U+3008x	𰂀	𰂁	𰂂	𰂃	𰂄	𰂅	𰂆	𰂇	𰂈	𰂉	𰂊	𰂋	𰂌	𰂍	𰂎	𰂏
U+3009x	𰂐	𰂑	𰂒	𰂓	𰂔	𰂕	𰂖	𰂗	𰂘	𰂙	𰂚	𰂛	𰂜	𰂝	𰂞	𰂟
U+300Ax	𰂠	𰂡	𰂢	𰂣	𰂤	𰂥	𰂦	𰂧	𰂨	𰂩	𰂪	𰂫	𰂬	𰂭	𰂮	𰂯
U+300Bx	𰂰	𰂱	𰂲	𰂳	𰂴	𰂵	𰂶	𰂷	𰂸	𰂹	𰂺	𰂻	𰂼	𰂽	𰂾	𰂿
U+300Cx	𰃀	𰃁	𰃂	𰃃	𰃄	𰃅	𰃆	𰃇	𰃈	𰃉	𰃊	𰃋	𰃌	𰃍	𰃎	𰃏
U+300Dx	𰃐	𰃑	𰃒	𰃓	𰃔	𰃕	𰃖	𰃗	𰃘	𰃙	𰃚	𰃛	𰃜	𰃝	𰃞	𰃟
U+300Ex	𰃠	𰃡	𰃢	𰃣	𰃤	𰃥	𰃦	𰃧	𰃨	𰃩	𰃪	𰃫	𰃬	𰃭	𰃮	𰃯
U+300Fx	𰃰	𰃱	𰃲	𰃳	𰃴	𰃵	𰃶	𰃷	𰃸	𰃹	𰃺	𰃻	𰃼	𰃽	𰃾	𰃿
U+3010x	𰄀	𰄁	𰄂	𰄃	𰄄	𰄅	𰄆	𰄇	𰄈	𰄉	𰄊	𰄋	𰄌	𰄍	𰄎	𰄏
U+3011x	𰄐	𰄑	𰄒	𰄓	𰄔	𰄕	𰄖	𰄗	𰄘	𰄙	𰄚	𰄛	𰄜	𰄝	𰄞	𰄟
U+3012x	𰄠	𰄡	𰄢	𰄣	𰄤	𰄥	𰄦	𰄧	𰄨	𰄩	𰄪	𰄫	𰄬	𰄭	𰄮	𰄯
U+3013x	𰄰	𰄱	𰄲	𰄳	𰄴	𰄵	𰄶	𰄷	𰄸	𰄹	𰄺	𰄻	𰄼	𰄽	𰄾	𰄿
U+3014x	𰅀	𰅁	𰅂	𰅃	𰅄	𰅅	𰅆	𰅇	𰅈	𰅉	𰅊	𰅋	𰅌	𰅍	𰅎	𰅏
U+3015x	𰅐	𰅑	𰅒	𰅓	𰅔	𰅕	𰅖	𰅗	𰅘	𰅙	𰅚	𰅛	𰅜	𰅝	𰅞	𰅟
U+3016x	𰅠	𰅡	𰅢	𰅣	𰅤	𰅥	𰅦	𰅧	𰅨	𰅩	𰅪	𰅫	𰅬	𰅭	𰅮	𰅯
U+3017x	𰅰	𰅱	𰅲	𰅳	𰅴	𰅵	𰅶	𰅷	𰅸	𰅹	𰅺	𰅻	𰅼	𰅽	𰅾	𰅿
U+3018x	𰆀	𰆁	𰆂	𰆃	𰆄	𰆅	𰆆	𰆇	𰆈	𰆉	𰆊	𰆋	𰆌	𰆍	𰆎	𰆏
U+3019x	𰆐	𰆑	𰆒	𰆓	𰆔	𰆕	𰆖	𰆗	𰆘	𰆙	𰆚	𰆛	𰆜	𰆝	𰆞	𰆟
U+301Ax	𰆠	𰆡	𰆢	𰆣	𰆤	𰆥	𰆦	𰆧	𰆨	𰆩	𰆪	𰆫	𰆬	𰆭	𰆮	𰆯
U+301Bx	𰆰	𰆱	𰆲	𰆳	𰆴	𰆵	𰆶	𰆷	𰆸	𰆹	𰆺	𰆻	𰆼	𰆽	𰆾	𰆿
U+301Cx	𰇀	𰇁	𰇂	𰇃	𰇄	𰇅	𰇆	𰇇	𰇈	𰇉	𰇊	𰇋	𰇌	𰇍	𰇎	𰇏
U+301Dx	𰇐	𰇑	𰇒	𰇓	𰇔	𰇕	𰇖	𰇗	𰇘	𰇙	𰇚	𰇛	𰇜	𰇝	𰇞	𰇟
U+301Ex	𰇠	𰇡	𰇢	𰇣	𰇤	𰇥	𰇦	𰇧	𰇨	𰇩	𰇪	𰇫	𰇬	𰇭	𰇮	𰇯
U+301Fx	𰇰	𰇱	𰇲	𰇳	𰇴	𰇵	𰇶	𰇷	𰇸	𰇹	𰇺	𰇻	𰇼	𰇽	𰇾	𰇿
U+3020x	𰈀	𰈁	𰈂	𰈃	𰈄	𰈅	𰈆	𰈇	𰈈	𰈉	𰈊	𰈋	𰈌	𰈍	𰈎	𰈏
U+3021x	𰈐	𰈑	𰈒	𰈓	𰈔	𰈕	𰈖	𰈗	𰈘	𰈙	𰈚	𰈛	𰈜	𰈝	𰈞	𰈟
U+3022x	𰈠	𰈡	𰈢	𰈣	𰈤	𰈥	𰈦	𰈧	𰈨	𰈩	𰈪	𰈫	𰈬	𰈭	𰈮	𰈯
U+3023x	𰈰	𰈱	𰈲	𰈳	𰈴	𰈵	𰈶	𰈷	𰈸	𰈹	𰈺	𰈻	𰈼	𰈽	𰈾	𰈿
U+3024x	𰉀	𰉁	𰉂	𰉃	𰉄	𰉅	𰉆	𰉇	𰉈	𰉉	𰉊	𰉋	𰉌	𰉍	𰉎	𰉏
U+3025x	𰉐	𰉑	𰉒	𰉓	𰉔	𰉕	𰉖	𰉗	𰉘	𰉙	𰉚	𰉛	𰉜	𰉝	𰉞	𰉟
U+3026x	𰉠	𰉡	𰉢	𰉣	𰉤	𰉥	𰉦	𰉧	𰉨	𰉩	𰉪	𰉫	𰉬	𰉭	𰉮	𰉯
U+3027x	𰉰	𰉱	𰉲	𰉳	𰉴	𰉵	𰉶	𰉷	𰉸	𰉹	𰉺	𰉻	𰉼	𰉽	𰉾	𰉿
U+3028x	𰊀	𰊁	𰊂	𰊃	𰊄	𰊅	𰊆	𰊇	𰊈	𰊉	𰊊	𰊋	𰊌	𰊍	𰊎	𰊏
U+3029x	𰊐	𰊑	𰊒	𰊓	𰊔	𰊕	𰊖	𰊗	𰊘	𰊙	𰊚	𰊛	𰊜	𰊝	𰊞	𰊟
U+302Ax	𰊠	𰊡	𰊢	𰊣	𰊤	𰊥	𰊦	𰊧	𰊨	𰊩	𰊪	𰊫	𰊬	𰊭	𰊮	𰊯
U+302Bx	𰊰	𰊱	𰊲	𰊳	𰊴	𰊵	𰊶	𰊷	𰊸	𰊹	𰊺	𰊻	𰊼	𰊽	𰊾	𰊿
U+302Cx	𰋀	𰋁	𰋂	𰋃	𰋄	𰋅	𰋆	𰋇	𰋈	𰋉	𰋊	𰋋	𰋌	𰋍	𰋎	𰋏
U+302Dx	𰋐	𰋑	𰋒	𰋓	𰋔	𰋕	𰋖	𰋗	𰋘	𰋙	𰋚	𰋛	𰋜	𰋝	𰋞	𰋟
U+302Ex	𰋠	𰋡	𰋢	𰋣	𰋤	𰋥	𰋦	𰋧	𰋨	𰋩	𰋪	𰋫	𰋬	𰋭	𰋮	𰋯
U+302Fx	𰋰	𰋱	𰋲	𰋳	𰋴	𰋵	𰋶	𰋷	𰋸	𰋹	𰋺	𰋻	𰋼	𰋽	𰋾	𰋿
U+3030x	𰌀	𰌁	𰌂	𰌃	𰌄	𰌅	𰌆	𰌇	𰌈	𰌉	𰌊	𰌋	𰌌	𰌍	𰌎	𰌏
U+3031x	𰌐	𰌑	𰌒	𰌓	𰌔	𰌕	𰌖	𰌗	𰌘	𰌙	𰌚	𰌛	𰌜	𰌝	𰌞	𰌟
U+3032x	𰌠	𰌡	𰌢	𰌣	𰌤	𰌥	𰌦	𰌧	𰌨	𰌩	𰌪	𰌫	𰌬	𰌭	𰌮	𰌯
U+3033x	𰌰	𰌱	𰌲	𰌳	𰌴	𰌵	𰌶	𰌷	𰌸	𰌹	𰌺	𰌻	𰌼	𰌽	𰌾	𰌿
U+3034x	𰍀	𰍁	𰍂	𰍃	𰍄	𰍅	𰍆	𰍇	𰍈	𰍉	𰍊	𰍋	𰍌	𰍍	𰍎	𰍏
U+3035x	𰍐	𰍑	𰍒	𰍓	𰍔	𰍕	𰍖	𰍗	𰍘	𰍙	𰍚	𰍛	𰍜	𰍝	𰍞	𰍟
U+3036x	𰍠	𰍡	𰍢	𰍣	𰍤	𰍥	𰍦	𰍧	𰍨	𰍩	𰍪	𰍫	𰍬	𰍭	𰍮	𰍯
U+3037x	𰍰	𰍱	𰍲	𰍳	𰍴	𰍵	𰍶	𰍷	𰍸	𰍹	𰍺	𰍻	𰍼	𰍽	𰍾	𰍿
U+3038x	𰎀	𰎁	𰎂	𰎃	𰎄	𰎅	𰎆	𰎇	𰎈	𰎉	𰎊	𰎋	𰎌	𰎍	𰎎	𰎏
U+3039x	𰎐	𰎑	𰎒	𰎓	𰎔	𰎕	𰎖	𰎗	𰎘	𰎙	𰎚	𰎛	𰎜	𰎝	𰎞	𰎟
U+303Ax	𰎠	𰎡	𰎢	𰎣	𰎤	𰎥	𰎦	𰎧	𰎨	𰎩	𰎪	𰎫	𰎬	𰎭	𰎮	𰎯
U+303Bx	𰎰	𰎱	𰎲	𰎳	𰎴	𰎵	𰎶	𰎷	𰎸	𰎹	𰎺	𰎻	𰎼	𰎽	𰎾	𰎿
U+303Cx	𰏀	𰏁	𰏂	𰏃	𰏄	𰏅	𰏆	𰏇	𰏈	𰏉	𰏊	𰏋	𰏌	𰏍	𰏎	𰏏
U+303Dx	𰏐	𰏑	𰏒	𰏓	𰏔	𰏕	𰏖	𰏗	𰏘	𰏙	𰏚	𰏛	𰏜	𰏝	𰏞	𰏟
U+303Ex	𰏠	𰏡	𰏢	𰏣	𰏤	𰏥	𰏦	𰏧	𰏨	𰏩	𰏪	𰏫	𰏬	𰏭	𰏮	𰏯
U+303Fx	𰏰	𰏱	𰏲	𰏳	𰏴	𰏵	𰏶	𰏷	𰏸	𰏹	𰏺	𰏻	𰏼	𰏽	𰏾	𰏿
U+3040x	𰐀	𰐁	𰐂	𰐃	𰐄	𰐅	𰐆	𰐇	𰐈	𰐉	𰐊	𰐋	𰐌	𰐍	𰐎	𰐏
U+3041x	𰐐	𰐑	𰐒	𰐓	𰐔	𰐕	𰐖	𰐗	𰐘	𰐙	𰐚	𰐛	𰐜	𰐝	𰐞	𰐟
U+3042x	𰐠	𰐡	𰐢	𰐣	𰐤	𰐥	𰐦	𰐧	𰐨	𰐩	𰐪	𰐫	𰐬	𰐭	𰐮	𰐯
U+3043x	𰐰	𰐱	𰐲	𰐳	𰐴	𰐵	𰐶	𰐷	𰐸	𰐹	𰐺	𰐻	𰐼	𰐽	𰐾	𰐿
U+3044x	𰑀	𰑁	𰑂	𰑃	𰑄	𰑅	𰑆	𰑇	𰑈	𰑉	𰑊	𰑋	𰑌	𰑍	𰑎	𰑏
U+3045x	𰑐	𰑑	𰑒	𰑓	𰑔	𰑕	𰑖	𰑗	𰑘	𰑙	𰑚	𰑛	𰑜	𰑝	𰑞	𰑟
U+3046x	𰑠	𰑡	𰑢	𰑣	𰑤	𰑥	𰑦	𰑧	𰑨	𰑩	𰑪	𰑫	𰑬	𰑭	𰑮	𰑯
U+3047x	𰑰	𰑱	𰑲	𰑳	𰑴	𰑵	𰑶	𰑷	𰑸	𰑹	𰑺	𰑻	𰑼	𰑽	𰑾	𰑿
U+3048x	𰒀	𰒁	𰒂	𰒃	𰒄	𰒅	𰒆	𰒇	𰒈	𰒉	𰒊	𰒋	𰒌	𰒍	𰒎	𰒏
U+3049x	𰒐	𰒑	𰒒	𰒓	𰒔	𰒕	𰒖	𰒗	𰒘	𰒙	𰒚	𰒛	𰒜	𰒝	𰒞	𰒟
U+304Ax	𰒠	𰒡	𰒢	𰒣	𰒤	𰒥	𰒦	𰒧	𰒨	𰒩	𰒪	𰒫	𰒬	𰒭	𰒮	𰒯
U+304Bx	𰒰	𰒱	𰒲	𰒳	𰒴	𰒵	𰒶	𰒷	𰒸	𰒹	𰒺	𰒻	𰒼	𰒽	𰒾	𰒿
U+304Cx	𰓀	𰓁	𰓂	𰓃	𰓄	𰓅	𰓆	𰓇	𰓈	𰓉	𰓊	𰓋	𰓌	𰓍	𰓎	𰓏
U+304Dx	𰓐	𰓑	𰓒	𰓓	𰓔	𰓕	𰓖	𰓗	𰓘	𰓙	𰓚	𰓛	𰓜	𰓝	𰓞	𰓟
U+304Ex	𰓠	𰓡	𰓢	𰓣	𰓤	𰓥	𰓦	𰓧	𰓨	𰓩	𰓪	𰓫	𰓬	𰓭	𰓮	𰓯
U+304Fx	𰓰	𰓱	𰓲	𰓳	𰓴	𰓵	𰓶	𰓷	𰓸	𰓹	𰓺	𰓻	𰓼	𰓽	𰓾	𰓿
U+3050x	𰔀	𰔁	𰔂	𰔃	𰔄	𰔅	𰔆	𰔇	𰔈	𰔉	𰔊	𰔋	𰔌	𰔍	𰔎	𰔏
U+3051x	𰔐	𰔑	𰔒	𰔓	𰔔	𰔕	𰔖	𰔗	𰔘	𰔙	𰔚	𰔛	𰔜	𰔝	𰔞	𰔟
U+3052x	𰔠	𰔡	𰔢	𰔣	𰔤	𰔥	𰔦	𰔧	𰔨	𰔩	𰔪	𰔫	𰔬	𰔭	𰔮	𰔯
U+3053x	𰔰	𰔱	𰔲	𰔳	𰔴	𰔵	𰔶	𰔷	𰔸	𰔹	𰔺	𰔻	𰔼	𰔽	𰔾	𰔿
U+3054x	𰕀	𰕁	𰕂	𰕃	𰕄	𰕅	𰕆	𰕇	𰕈	𰕉	𰕊	𰕋	𰕌	𰕍	𰕎	𰕏
U+3055x	𰕐	𰕑	𰕒	𰕓	𰕔	𰕕	𰕖	𰕗	𰕘	𰕙	𰕚	𰕛	𰕜	𰕝	𰕞	𰕟
U+3056x	𰕠	𰕡	𰕢	𰕣	𰕤	𰕥	𰕦	𰕧	𰕨	𰕩	𰕪	𰕫	𰕬	𰕭	𰕮	𰕯
U+3057x	𰕰	𰕱	𰕲	𰕳	𰕴	𰕵	𰕶	𰕷	𰕸	𰕹	𰕺	𰕻	𰕼	𰕽	𰕾	𰕿
U+3058x	𰖀	𰖁	𰖂	𰖃	𰖄	𰖅	𰖆	𰖇	𰖈	𰖉	𰖊	𰖋	𰖌	𰖍	𰖎	𰖏
U+3059x	𰖐	𰖑	𰖒	𰖓	𰖔	𰖕	𰖖	𰖗	𰖘	𰖙	𰖚	𰖛	𰖜	𰖝	𰖞	𰖟
U+305Ax	𰖠	𰖡	𰖢	𰖣	𰖤	𰖥	𰖦	𰖧	𰖨	𰖩	𰖪	𰖫	𰖬	𰖭	𰖮	𰖯
U+305Bx	𰖰	𰖱	𰖲	𰖳	𰖴	𰖵	𰖶	𰖷	𰖸	𰖹	𰖺	𰖻	𰖼	𰖽	𰖾	𰖿
U+305Cx	𰗀	𰗁	𰗂	𰗃	𰗄	𰗅	𰗆	𰗇	𰗈	𰗉	𰗊	𰗋	𰗌	𰗍	𰗎	𰗏
U+305Dx	𰗐	𰗑	𰗒	𰗓	𰗔	𰗕	𰗖	𰗗	𰗘	𰗙	𰗚	𰗛	𰗜	𰗝	𰗞	𰗟
U+305Ex	𰗠	𰗡	𰗢	𰗣	𰗤	𰗥	𰗦	𰗧	𰗨	𰗩	𰗪	𰗫	𰗬	𰗭	𰗮	𰗯
U+305Fx	𰗰	𰗱	𰗲	𰗳	𰗴	𰗵	𰗶	𰗷	𰗸	𰗹	𰗺	𰗻	𰗼	𰗽	𰗾	𰗿
U+3060x	𰘀	𰘁	𰘂	𰘃	𰘄	𰘅	𰘆	𰘇	𰘈	𰘉	𰘊	𰘋	𰘌	𰘍	𰘎	𰘏
U+3061x	𰘐	𰘑	𰘒	𰘓	𰘔	𰘕	𰘖	𰘗	𰘘	𰘙	𰘚	𰘛	𰘜	𰘝	𰘞	𰘟
U+3062x	𰘠	𰘡	𰘢	𰘣	𰘤	𰘥	𰘦	𰘧	𰘨	𰘩	𰘪	𰘫	𰘬	𰘭	𰘮	𰘯
U+3063x	𰘰	𰘱	𰘲	𰘳	𰘴	𰘵	𰘶	𰘷	𰘸	𰘹	𰘺	𰘻	𰘼	𰘽	𰘾	𰘿
U+3064x	𰙀	𰙁	𰙂	𰙃	𰙄	𰙅	𰙆	𰙇	𰙈	𰙉	𰙊	𰙋	𰙌	𰙍	𰙎	𰙏
U+3065x	𰙐	𰙑	𰙒	𰙓	𰙔	𰙕	𰙖	𰙗	𰙘	𰙙	𰙚	𰙛	𰙜	𰙝	𰙞	𰙟
U+3066x	𰙠	𰙡	𰙢	𰙣	𰙤	𰙥	𰙦	𰙧	𰙨	𰙩	𰙪	𰙫	𰙬	𰙭	𰙮	𰙯
U+3067x	𰙰	𰙱	𰙲	𰙳	𰙴	𰙵	𰙶	𰙷	𰙸	𰙹	𰙺	𰙻	𰙼	𰙽	𰙾	𰙿
U+3068x	𰚀	𰚁	𰚂	𰚃	𰚄	𰚅	𰚆	𰚇	𰚈	𰚉	𰚊	𰚋	𰚌	𰚍	𰚎	𰚏
U+3069x	𰚐	𰚑	𰚒	𰚓	𰚔	𰚕	𰚖	𰚗	𰚘	𰚙	𰚚	𰚛	𰚜	𰚝	𰚞	𰚟
U+306Ax	𰚠	𰚡	𰚢	𰚣	𰚤	𰚥	𰚦	𰚧	𰚨	𰚩	𰚪	𰚫	𰚬	𰚭	𰚮	𰚯
U+306Bx	𰚰	𰚱	𰚲	𰚳	𰚴	𰚵	𰚶	𰚷	𰚸	𰚹	𰚺	𰚻	𰚼	𰚽	𰚾	𰚿
U+306Cx	𰛀	𰛁	𰛂	𰛃	𰛄	𰛅	𰛆	𰛇	𰛈	𰛉	𰛊	𰛋	𰛌	𰛍	𰛎	𰛏
U+306Dx	𰛐	𰛑	𰛒	𰛓	𰛔	𰛕	𰛖	𰛗	𰛘	𰛙	𰛚	𰛛	𰛜	𰛝	𰛞	𰛟
U+306Ex	𰛠	𰛡	𰛢	𰛣	𰛤	𰛥	𰛦	𰛧	𰛨	𰛩	𰛪	𰛫	𰛬	𰛭	𰛮	𰛯
U+306Fx	𰛰	𰛱	𰛲	𰛳	𰛴	𰛵	𰛶	𰛷	𰛸	𰛹	𰛺	𰛻	𰛼	𰛽	𰛾	𰛿
U+3070x	𰜀	𰜁	𰜂	𰜃	𰜄	𰜅	𰜆	𰜇	𰜈	𰜉	𰜊	𰜋	𰜌	𰜍	𰜎	𰜏
U+3071x	𰜐	𰜑	𰜒	𰜓	𰜔	𰜕	𰜖	𰜗	𰜘	𰜙	𰜚	𰜛	𰜜	𰜝	𰜞	𰜟
U+3072x	𰜠	𰜡	𰜢	𰜣	𰜤	𰜥	𰜦	𰜧	𰜨	𰜩	𰜪	𰜫	𰜬	𰜭	𰜮	𰜯
U+3073x	𰜰	𰜱	𰜲	𰜳	𰜴	𰜵	𰜶	𰜷	𰜸	𰜹	𰜺	𰜻	𰜼	𰜽	𰜾	𰜿
U+3074x	𰝀	𰝁	𰝂	𰝃	𰝄	𰝅	𰝆	𰝇	𰝈	𰝉	𰝊	𰝋	𰝌	𰝍	𰝎	𰝏
U+3075x	𰝐	𰝑	𰝒	𰝓	𰝔	𰝕	𰝖	𰝗	𰝘	𰝙	𰝚	𰝛	𰝜	𰝝	𰝞	𰝟
U+3076x	𰝠	𰝡	𰝢	𰝣	𰝤	𰝥	𰝦	𰝧	𰝨	𰝩	𰝪	𰝫	𰝬	𰝭	𰝮	𰝯
U+3077x	𰝰	𰝱	𰝲	𰝳	𰝴	𰝵	𰝶	𰝷	𰝸	𰝹	𰝺	𰝻	𰝼	𰝽	𰝾	𰝿
U+3078x	𰞀	𰞁	𰞂	𰞃	𰞄	𰞅	𰞆	𰞇	𰞈	𰞉	𰞊	𰞋	𰞌	𰞍	𰞎	𰞏
U+3079x	𰞐	𰞑	𰞒	𰞓	𰞔	𰞕	𰞖	𰞗	𰞘	𰞙	𰞚	𰞛	𰞜	𰞝	𰞞	𰞟
U+307Ax	𰞠	𰞡	𰞢	𰞣	𰞤	𰞥	𰞦	𰞧	𰞨	𰞩	𰞪	𰞫	𰞬	𰞭	𰞮	𰞯
U+307Bx	𰞰	𰞱	𰞲	𰞳	𰞴	𰞵	𰞶	𰞷	𰞸	𰞹	𰞺	𰞻	𰞼	𰞽	𰞾	𰞿
U+307Cx	𰟀	𰟁	𰟂	𰟃	𰟄	𰟅	𰟆	𰟇	𰟈	𰟉	𰟊	𰟋	𰟌	𰟍	𰟎	𰟏
U+307Dx	𰟐	𰟑	𰟒	𰟓	𰟔	𰟕	𰟖	𰟗	𰟘	𰟙	𰟚	𰟛	𰟜	𰟝	𰟞	𰟟
U+307Ex	𰟠	𰟡	𰟢	𰟣	𰟤	𰟥	𰟦	𰟧	𰟨	𰟩	𰟪	𰟫	𰟬	𰟭	𰟮	𰟯
U+307Fx	𰟰	𰟱	𰟲	𰟳	𰟴	𰟵	𰟶	𰟷	𰟸	𰟹	𰟺	𰟻	𰟼	𰟽	𰟾	𰟿
U+3080x	𰠀	𰠁	𰠂	𰠃	𰠄	𰠅	𰠆	𰠇	𰠈	𰠉	𰠊	𰠋	𰠌	𰠍	𰠎	𰠏
U+3081x	𰠐	𰠑	𰠒	𰠓	𰠔	𰠕	𰠖	𰠗	𰠘	𰠙	𰠚	𰠛	𰠜	𰠝	𰠞	𰠟
U+3082x	𰠠	𰠡	𰠢	𰠣	𰠤	𰠥	𰠦	𰠧	𰠨	𰠩	𰠪	𰠫	𰠬	𰠭	𰠮	𰠯
U+3083x	𰠰	𰠱	𰠲	𰠳	𰠴	𰠵	𰠶	𰠷	𰠸	𰠹	𰠺	𰠻	𰠼	𰠽	𰠾	𰠿
U+3084x	𰡀	𰡁	𰡂	𰡃	𰡄	𰡅	𰡆	𰡇	𰡈	𰡉	𰡊	𰡋	𰡌	𰡍	𰡎	𰡏
U+3085x	𰡐	𰡑	𰡒	𰡓	𰡔	𰡕	𰡖	𰡗	𰡘	𰡙	𰡚	𰡛	𰡜	𰡝	𰡞	𰡟
U+3086x	𰡠	𰡡	𰡢	𰡣	𰡤	𰡥	𰡦	𰡧	𰡨	𰡩	𰡪	𰡫	𰡬	𰡭	𰡮	𰡯
U+3087x	𰡰	𰡱	𰡲	𰡳	𰡴	𰡵	𰡶	𰡷	𰡸	𰡹	𰡺	𰡻	𰡼	𰡽	𰡾	𰡿
U+3088x	𰢀	𰢁	𰢂	𰢃	𰢄	𰢅	𰢆	𰢇	𰢈	𰢉	𰢊	𰢋	𰢌	𰢍	𰢎	𰢏
U+3089x	𰢐	𰢑	𰢒	𰢓	𰢔	𰢕	𰢖	𰢗	𰢘	𰢙	𰢚	𰢛	𰢜	𰢝	𰢞	𰢟
U+308Ax	𰢠	𰢡	𰢢	𰢣	𰢤	𰢥	𰢦	𰢧	𰢨	𰢩	𰢪	𰢫	𰢬	𰢭	𰢮	𰢯
U+308Bx	𰢰	𰢱	𰢲	𰢳	𰢴	𰢵	𰢶	𰢷	𰢸	𰢹	𰢺	𰢻	𰢼	𰢽	𰢾	𰢿
U+308Cx	𰣀	𰣁	𰣂	𰣃	𰣄	𰣅	𰣆	𰣇	𰣈	𰣉	𰣊	𰣋	𰣌	𰣍	𰣎	𰣏
U+308Dx	𰣐	𰣑	𰣒	𰣓	𰣔	𰣕	𰣖	𰣗	𰣘	𰣙	𰣚	𰣛	𰣜	𰣝	𰣞	𰣟
U+308Ex	𰣠	𰣡	𰣢	𰣣	𰣤	𰣥	𰣦	𰣧	𰣨	𰣩	𰣪	𰣫	𰣬	𰣭	𰣮	𰣯
U+308Fx	𰣰	𰣱	𰣲	𰣳	𰣴	𰣵	𰣶	𰣷	𰣸	𰣹	𰣺	𰣻	𰣼	𰣽	𰣾	𰣿
U+3090x	𰤀	𰤁	𰤂	𰤃	𰤄	𰤅	𰤆	𰤇	𰤈	𰤉	𰤊	𰤋	𰤌	𰤍	𰤎	𰤏
U+3091x	𰤐	𰤑	𰤒	𰤓	𰤔	𰤕	𰤖	𰤗	𰤘	𰤙	𰤚	𰤛	𰤜	𰤝	𰤞	𰤟
U+3092x	𰤠	𰤡	𰤢	𰤣	𰤤	𰤥	𰤦	𰤧	𰤨	𰤩	𰤪	𰤫	𰤬	𰤭	𰤮	𰤯
U+3093x	𰤰	𰤱	𰤲	𰤳	𰤴	𰤵	𰤶	𰤷	𰤸	𰤹	𰤺	𰤻	𰤼	𰤽	𰤾	𰤿
U+3094x	𰥀	𰥁	𰥂	𰥃	𰥄	𰥅	𰥆	𰥇	𰥈	𰥉	𰥊	𰥋	𰥌	𰥍	𰥎	𰥏
U+3095x	𰥐	𰥑	𰥒	𰥓	𰥔	𰥕	𰥖	𰥗	𰥘	𰥙	𰥚	𰥛	𰥜	𰥝	𰥞	𰥟
U+3096x	𰥠	𰥡	𰥢	𰥣	𰥤	𰥥	𰥦	𰥧	𰥨	𰥩	𰥪	𰥫	𰥬	𰥭	𰥮	𰥯
U+3097x	𰥰	𰥱	𰥲	𰥳	𰥴	𰥵	𰥶	𰥷	𰥸	𰥹	𰥺	𰥻	𰥼	𰥽	𰥾	𰥿
U+3098x	𰦀	𰦁	𰦂	𰦃	𰦄	𰦅	𰦆	𰦇	𰦈	𰦉	𰦊	𰦋	𰦌	𰦍	𰦎	𰦏
U+3099x	𰦐	𰦑	𰦒	𰦓	𰦔	𰦕	𰦖	𰦗	𰦘	𰦙	𰦚	𰦛	𰦜	𰦝	𰦞	𰦟
U+309Ax	𰦠	𰦡	𰦢	𰦣	𰦤	𰦥	𰦦	𰦧	𰦨	𰦩	𰦪	𰦫	𰦬	𰦭	𰦮	𰦯
U+309Bx	𰦰	𰦱	𰦲	𰦳	𰦴	𰦵	𰦶	𰦷	𰦸	𰦹	𰦺	𰦻	𰦼	𰦽	𰦾	𰦿
U+309Cx	𰧀	𰧁	𰧂	𰧃	𰧄	𰧅	𰧆	𰧇	𰧈	𰧉	𰧊	𰧋	𰧌	𰧍	𰧎	𰧏
U+309Dx	𰧐	𰧑	𰧒	𰧓	𰧔	𰧕	𰧖	𰧗	𰧘	𰧙	𰧚	𰧛	𰧜	𰧝	𰧞	𰧟
U+309Ex	𰧠	𰧡	𰧢	𰧣	𰧤	𰧥	𰧦	𰧧	𰧨	𰧩	𰧪	𰧫	𰧬	𰧭	𰧮	𰧯
U+309Fx	𰧰	𰧱	𰧲	𰧳	𰧴	𰧵	𰧶	𰧷	𰧸	𰧹	𰧺	𰧻	𰧼	𰧽	𰧾	𰧿
U+30A0x	𰨀	𰨁	𰨂	𰨃	𰨄	𰨅	𰨆	𰨇	𰨈	𰨉	𰨊	𰨋	𰨌	𰨍	𰨎	𰨏
U+30A1x	𰨐	𰨑	𰨒	𰨓	𰨔	𰨕	𰨖	𰨗	𰨘	𰨙	𰨚	𰨛	𰨜	𰨝	𰨞	𰨟
U+30A2x	𰨠	𰨡	𰨢	𰨣	𰨤	𰨥	𰨦	𰨧	𰨨	𰨩	𰨪	𰨫	𰨬	𰨭	𰨮	𰨯
U+30A3x	𰨰	𰨱	𰨲	𰨳	𰨴	𰨵	𰨶	𰨷	𰨸	𰨹	𰨺	𰨻	𰨼	𰨽	𰨾	𰨿
U+30A4x	𰩀	𰩁	𰩂	𰩃	𰩄	𰩅	𰩆	𰩇	𰩈	𰩉	𰩊	𰩋	𰩌	𰩍	𰩎	𰩏
U+30A5x	𰩐	𰩑	𰩒	𰩓	𰩔	𰩕	𰩖	𰩗	𰩘	𰩙	𰩚	𰩛	𰩜	𰩝	𰩞	𰩟
U+30A6x	𰩠	𰩡	𰩢	𰩣	𰩤	𰩥	𰩦	𰩧	𰩨	𰩩	𰩪	𰩫	𰩬	𰩭	𰩮	𰩯
U+30A7x	𰩰	𰩱	𰩲	𰩳	𰩴	𰩵	𰩶	𰩷	𰩸	𰩹	𰩺	𰩻	𰩼	𰩽	𰩾	𰩿
U+30A8x	𰪀	𰪁	𰪂	𰪃	𰪄	𰪅	𰪆	𰪇	𰪈	𰪉	𰪊	𰪋	𰪌	𰪍	𰪎	𰪏
U+30A9x	𰪐	𰪑	𰪒	𰪓	𰪔	𰪕	𰪖	𰪗	𰪘	𰪙	𰪚	𰪛	𰪜	𰪝	𰪞	𰪟
U+30AAx	𰪠	𰪡	𰪢	𰪣	𰪤	𰪥	𰪦	𰪧	𰪨	𰪩	𰪪	𰪫	𰪬	𰪭	𰪮	𰪯
U+30ABx	𰪰	𰪱	𰪲	𰪳	𰪴	𰪵	𰪶	𰪷	𰪸	𰪹	𰪺	𰪻	𰪼	𰪽	𰪾	𰪿
U+30ACx	𰫀	𰫁	𰫂	𰫃	𰫄	𰫅	𰫆	𰫇	𰫈	𰫉	𰫊	𰫋	𰫌	𰫍	𰫎	𰫏
U+30ADx	𰫐	𰫑	𰫒	𰫓	𰫔	𰫕	𰫖	𰫗	𰫘	𰫙	𰫚	𰫛	𰫜	𰫝	𰫞	𰫟
U+30AEx	𰫠	𰫡	𰫢	𰫣	𰫤	𰫥	𰫦	𰫧	𰫨	𰫩	𰫪	𰫫	𰫬	𰫭	𰫮	𰫯
U+30AFx	𰫰	𰫱	𰫲	𰫳	𰫴	𰫵	𰫶	𰫷	𰫸	𰫹	𰫺	𰫻	𰫼	𰫽	𰫾	𰫿
U+30B0x	𰬀	𰬁	𰬂	𰬃	𰬄	𰬅	𰬆	𰬇	𰬈	𰬉	𰬊	𰬋	𰬌	𰬍	𰬎	𰬏
U+30B1x	𰬐	𰬑	𰬒	𰬓	𰬔	𰬕	𰬖	𰬗	𰬘	𰬙	𰬚	𰬛	𰬜	𰬝	𰬞	𰬟
U+30B2x	𰬠	𰬡	𰬢	𰬣	𰬤	𰬥	𰬦	𰬧	𰬨	𰬩	𰬪	𰬫	𰬬	𰬭	𰬮	𰬯
U+30B3x	𰬰	𰬱	𰬲	𰬳	𰬴	𰬵	𰬶	𰬷	𰬸	𰬹	𰬺	𰬻	𰬼	𰬽	𰬾	𰬿
U+30B4x	𰭀	𰭁	𰭂	𰭃	𰭄	𰭅	𰭆	𰭇	𰭈	𰭉	𰭊	𰭋	𰭌	𰭍	𰭎	𰭏
U+30B5x	𰭐	𰭑	𰭒	𰭓	𰭔	𰭕	𰭖	𰭗	𰭘	𰭙	𰭚	𰭛	𰭜	𰭝	𰭞	𰭟
U+30B6x	𰭠	𰭡	𰭢	𰭣	𰭤	𰭥	𰭦	𰭧	𰭨	𰭩	𰭪	𰭫	𰭬	𰭭	𰭮	𰭯
U+30B7x	𰭰	𰭱	𰭲	𰭳	𰭴	𰭵	𰭶	𰭷	𰭸	𰭹	𰭺	𰭻	𰭼	𰭽	𰭾	𰭿
U+30B8x	𰮀	𰮁	𰮂	𰮃	𰮄	𰮅	𰮆	𰮇	𰮈	𰮉	𰮊	𰮋	𰮌	𰮍	𰮎	𰮏
U+30B9x	𰮐	𰮑	𰮒	𰮓	𰮔	𰮕	𰮖	𰮗	𰮘	𰮙	𰮚	𰮛	𰮜	𰮝	𰮞	𰮟
U+30BAx	𰮠	𰮡	𰮢	𰮣	𰮤	𰮥	𰮦	𰮧	𰮨	𰮩	𰮪	𰮫	𰮬	𰮭	𰮮	𰮯
U+30BBx	𰮰	𰮱	𰮲	𰮳	𰮴	𰮵	𰮶	𰮷	𰮸	𰮹	𰮺	𰮻	𰮼	𰮽	𰮾	𰮿
U+30BCx	𰯀	𰯁	𰯂	𰯃	𰯄	𰯅	𰯆	𰯇	𰯈	𰯉	𰯊	𰯋	𰯌	𰯍	𰯎	𰯏
U+30BDx	𰯐	𰯑	𰯒	𰯓	𰯔	𰯕	𰯖	𰯗	𰯘	𰯙	𰯚	𰯛	𰯜	𰯝	𰯞	𰯟
U+30BEx	𰯠	𰯡	𰯢	𰯣	𰯤	𰯥	𰯦	𰯧	𰯨	𰯩	𰯪	𰯫	𰯬	𰯭	𰯮	𰯯
U+30BFx	𰯰	𰯱	𰯲	𰯳	𰯴	𰯵	𰯶	𰯷	𰯸	𰯹	𰯺	𰯻	𰯼	𰯽	𰯾	𰯿
U+30C0x	𰰀	𰰁	𰰂	𰰃	𰰄	𰰅	𰰆	𰰇	𰰈	𰰉	𰰊	𰰋	𰰌	𰰍	𰰎	𰰏
U+30C1x	𰰐	𰰑	𰰒	𰰓	𰰔	𰰕	𰰖	𰰗	𰰘	𰰙	𰰚	𰰛	𰰜	𰰝	𰰞	𰰟
U+30C2x	𰰠	𰰡	𰰢	𰰣	𰰤	𰰥	𰰦	𰰧	𰰨	𰰩	𰰪	𰰫	𰰬	𰰭	𰰮	𰰯
U+30C3x	𰰰	𰰱	𰰲	𰰳	𰰴	𰰵	𰰶	𰰷	𰰸	𰰹	𰰺	𰰻	𰰼	𰰽	𰰾	𰰿
U+30C4x	𰱀	𰱁	𰱂	𰱃	𰱄	𰱅	𰱆	𰱇	𰱈	𰱉	𰱊	𰱋	𰱌	𰱍	𰱎	𰱏
U+30C5x	𰱐	𰱑	𰱒	𰱓	𰱔	𰱕	𰱖	𰱗	𰱘	𰱙	𰱚	𰱛	𰱜	𰱝	𰱞	𰱟
U+30C6x	𰱠	𰱡	𰱢	𰱣	𰱤	𰱥	𰱦	𰱧	𰱨	𰱩	𰱪	𰱫	𰱬	𰱭	𰱮	𰱯
U+30C7x	𰱰	𰱱	𰱲	𰱳	𰱴	𰱵	𰱶	𰱷	𰱸	𰱹	𰱺	𰱻	𰱼	𰱽	𰱾	𰱿
U+30C8x	𰲀	𰲁	𰲂	𰲃	𰲄	𰲅	𰲆	𰲇	𰲈	𰲉	𰲊	𰲋	𰲌	𰲍	𰲎	𰲏
U+30C9x	𰲐	𰲑	𰲒	𰲓	𰲔	𰲕	𰲖	𰲗	𰲘	𰲙	𰲚	𰲛	𰲜	𰲝	𰲞	𰲟
U+30CAx	𰲠	𰲡	𰲢	𰲣	𰲤	𰲥	𰲦	𰲧	𰲨	𰲩	𰲪	𰲫	𰲬	𰲭	𰲮	𰲯
U+30CBx	𰲰	𰲱	𰲲	𰲳	𰲴	𰲵	𰲶	𰲷	𰲸	𰲹	𰲺	𰲻	𰲼	𰲽	𰲾	𰲿
U+30CCx	𰳀	𰳁	𰳂	𰳃	𰳄	𰳅	𰳆	𰳇	𰳈	𰳉	𰳊	𰳋	𰳌	𰳍	𰳎	𰳏
U+30CDx	𰳐	𰳑	𰳒	𰳓	𰳔	𰳕	𰳖	𰳗	𰳘	𰳙	𰳚	𰳛	𰳜	𰳝	𰳞	𰳟
U+30CEx	𰳠	𰳡	𰳢	𰳣	𰳤	𰳥	𰳦	𰳧	𰳨	𰳩	𰳪	𰳫	𰳬	𰳭	𰳮	𰳯
U+30CFx	𰳰	𰳱	𰳲	𰳳	𰳴	𰳵	𰳶	𰳷	𰳸	𰳹	𰳺	𰳻	𰳼	𰳽	𰳾	𰳿
U+30D0x	𰴀	𰴁	𰴂	𰴃	𰴄	𰴅	𰴆	𰴇	𰴈	𰴉	𰴊	𰴋	𰴌	𰴍	𰴎	𰴏
U+30D1x	𰴐	𰴑	𰴒	𰴓	𰴔	𰴕	𰴖	𰴗	𰴘	𰴙	𰴚	𰴛	𰴜	𰴝	𰴞	𰴟
U+30D2x	𰴠	𰴡	𰴢	𰴣	𰴤	𰴥	𰴦	𰴧	𰴨	𰴩	𰴪	𰴫	𰴬	𰴭	𰴮	𰴯
U+30D3x	𰴰	𰴱	𰴲	𰴳	𰴴	𰴵	𰴶	𰴷	𰴸	𰴹	𰴺	𰴻	𰴼	𰴽	𰴾	𰴿
U+30D4x	𰵀	𰵁	𰵂	𰵃	𰵄	𰵅	𰵆	𰵇	𰵈	𰵉	𰵊	𰵋	𰵌	𰵍	𰵎	𰵏
U+30D5x	𰵐	𰵑	𰵒	𰵓	𰵔	𰵕	𰵖	𰵗	𰵘	𰵙	𰵚	𰵛	𰵜	𰵝	𰵞	𰵟
U+30D6x	𰵠	𰵡	𰵢	𰵣	𰵤	𰵥	𰵦	𰵧	𰵨	𰵩	𰵪	𰵫	𰵬	𰵭	𰵮	𰵯
U+30D7x	𰵰	𰵱	𰵲	𰵳	𰵴	𰵵	𰵶	𰵷	𰵸	𰵹	𰵺	𰵻	𰵼	𰵽	𰵾	𰵿
U+30D8x	𰶀	𰶁	𰶂	𰶃	𰶄	𰶅	𰶆	𰶇	𰶈	𰶉	𰶊	𰶋	𰶌	𰶍	𰶎	𰶏
U+30D9x	𰶐	𰶑	𰶒	𰶓	𰶔	𰶕	𰶖	𰶗	𰶘	𰶙	𰶚	𰶛	𰶜	𰶝	𰶞	𰶟
U+30DAx	𰶠	𰶡	𰶢	𰶣	𰶤	𰶥	𰶦	𰶧	𰶨	𰶩	𰶪	𰶫	𰶬	𰶭	𰶮	𰶯
U+30DBx	𰶰	𰶱	𰶲	𰶳	𰶴	𰶵	𰶶	𰶷	𰶸	𰶹	𰶺	𰶻	𰶼	𰶽	𰶾	𰶿
U+30DCx	𰷀	𰷁	𰷂	𰷃	𰷄	𰷅	𰷆	𰷇	𰷈	𰷉	𰷊	𰷋	𰷌	𰷍	𰷎	𰷏
U+30DDx	𰷐	𰷑	𰷒	𰷓	𰷔	𰷕	𰷖	𰷗	𰷘	𰷙	𰷚	𰷛	𰷜	𰷝	𰷞	𰷟
U+30DEx	𰷠	𰷡	𰷢	𰷣	𰷤	𰷥	𰷦	𰷧	𰷨	𰷩	𰷪	𰷫	𰷬	𰷭	𰷮	𰷯
U+30DFx	𰷰	𰷱	𰷲	𰷳	𰷴	𰷵	𰷶	𰷷	𰷸	𰷹	𰷺	𰷻	𰷼	𰷽	𰷾	𰷿
U+30E0x	𰸀	𰸁	𰸂	𰸃	𰸄	𰸅	𰸆	𰸇	𰸈	𰸉	𰸊	𰸋	𰸌	𰸍	𰸎	𰸏
U+30E1x	𰸐	𰸑	𰸒	𰸓	𰸔	𰸕	𰸖	𰸗	𰸘	𰸙	𰸚	𰸛	𰸜	𰸝	𰸞	𰸟
U+30E2x	𰸠	𰸡	𰸢	𰸣	𰸤	𰸥	𰸦	𰸧	𰸨	𰸩	𰸪	𰸫	𰸬	𰸭	𰸮	𰸯
U+30E3x	𰸰	𰸱	𰸲	𰸳	𰸴	𰸵	𰸶	𰸷	𰸸	𰸹	𰸺	𰸻	𰸼	𰸽	𰸾	𰸿
U+30E4x	𰹀	𰹁	𰹂	𰹃	𰹄	𰹅	𰹆	𰹇	𰹈	𰹉	𰹊	𰹋	𰹌	𰹍	𰹎	𰹏
U+30E5x	𰹐	𰹑	𰹒	𰹓	𰹔	𰹕	𰹖	𰹗	𰹘	𰹙	𰹚	𰹛	𰹜	𰹝	𰹞	𰹟
U+30E6x	𰹠	𰹡	𰹢	𰹣	𰹤	𰹥	𰹦	𰹧	𰹨	𰹩	𰹪	𰹫	𰹬	𰹭	𰹮	𰹯
U+30E7x	𰹰	𰹱	𰹲	𰹳	𰹴	𰹵	𰹶	𰹷	𰹸	𰹹	𰹺	𰹻	𰹼	𰹽	𰹾	𰹿
U+30E8x	𰺀	𰺁	𰺂	𰺃	𰺄	𰺅	𰺆	𰺇	𰺈	𰺉	𰺊	𰺋	𰺌	𰺍	𰺎	𰺏
U+30E9x	𰺐	𰺑	𰺒	𰺓	𰺔	𰺕	𰺖	𰺗	𰺘	𰺙	𰺚	𰺛	𰺜	𰺝	𰺞	𰺟
U+30EAx	𰺠	𰺡	𰺢	𰺣	𰺤	𰺥	𰺦	𰺧	𰺨	𰺩	𰺪	𰺫	𰺬	𰺭	𰺮	𰺯
U+30EBx	𰺰	𰺱	𰺲	𰺳	𰺴	𰺵	𰺶	𰺷	𰺸	𰺹	𰺺	𰺻	𰺼	𰺽	𰺾	𰺿
U+30ECx	𰻀	𰻁	𰻂	𰻃	𰻄	𰻅	𰻆	𰻇	𰻈	𰻉	𰻊	𰻋	𰻌	𰻍	𰻎	𰻏
U+30EDx	𰻐	𰻑	𰻒	𰻓	𰻔	𰻕	𰻖	𰻗	𰻘	𰻙	𰻚	𰻛	𰻜	𰻝	𰻞	𰻟
U+30EEx	𰻠	𰻡	𰻢	𰻣	𰻤	𰻥	𰻦	𰻧	𰻨	𰻩	𰻪	𰻫	𰻬	𰻭	𰻮	𰻯
U+30EFx	𰻰	𰻱	𰻲	𰻳	𰻴	𰻵	𰻶	𰻷	𰻸	𰻹	𰻺	𰻻	𰻼	𰻽	𰻾	𰻿
U+30F0x	𰼀	𰼁	𰼂	𰼃	𰼄	𰼅	𰼆	𰼇	𰼈	𰼉	𰼊	𰼋	𰼌	𰼍	𰼎	𰼏
U+30F1x	𰼐	𰼑	𰼒	𰼓	𰼔	𰼕	𰼖	𰼗	𰼘	𰼙	𰼚	𰼛	𰼜	𰼝	𰼞	𰼟
U+30F2x	𰼠	𰼡	𰼢	𰼣	𰼤	𰼥	𰼦	𰼧	𰼨	𰼩	𰼪	𰼫	𰼬	𰼭	𰼮	𰼯
U+30F3x	𰼰	𰼱	𰼲	𰼳	𰼴	𰼵	𰼶	𰼷	𰼸	𰼹	𰼺	𰼻	𰼼	𰼽	𰼾	𰼿
U+30F4x	𰽀	𰽁	𰽂	𰽃	𰽄	𰽅	𰽆	𰽇	𰽈	𰽉	𰽊	𰽋	𰽌	𰽍	𰽎	𰽏
U+30F5x	𰽐	𰽑	𰽒	𰽓	𰽔	𰽕	𰽖	𰽗	𰽘	𰽙	𰽚	𰽛	𰽜	𰽝	𰽞	𰽟
U+30F6x	𰽠	𰽡	𰽢	𰽣	𰽤	𰽥	𰽦	𰽧	𰽨	𰽩	𰽪	𰽫	𰽬	𰽭	𰽮	𰽯
U+30F7x	𰽰	𰽱	𰽲	𰽳	𰽴	𰽵	𰽶	𰽷	𰽸	𰽹	𰽺	𰽻	𰽼	𰽽	𰽾	𰽿
U+30F8x	𰾀	𰾁	𰾂	𰾃	𰾄	𰾅	𰾆	𰾇	𰾈	𰾉	𰾊	𰾋	𰾌	𰾍	𰾎	𰾏
U+30F9x	𰾐	𰾑	𰾒	𰾓	𰾔	𰾕	𰾖	𰾗	𰾘	𰾙	𰾚	𰾛	𰾜	𰾝	𰾞	𰾟
U+30FAx	𰾠	𰾡	𰾢	𰾣	𰾤	𰾥	𰾦	𰾧	𰾨	𰾩	𰾪	𰾫	𰾬	𰾭	𰾮	𰾯
U+30FBx	𰾰	𰾱	𰾲	𰾳	𰾴	𰾵	𰾶	𰾷	𰾸	𰾹	𰾺	𰾻	𰾼	𰾽	𰾾	𰾿
U+30FCx	𰿀	𰿁	𰿂	𰿃	𰿄	𰿅	𰿆	𰿇	𰿈	𰿉	𰿊	𰿋	𰿌	𰿍	𰿎	𰿏
U+30FDx	𰿐	𰿑	𰿒	𰿓	𰿔	𰿕	𰿖	𰿗	𰿘	𰿙	𰿚	𰿛	𰿜	𰿝	𰿞	𰿟
U+30FEx	𰿠	𰿡	𰿢	𰿣	𰿤	𰿥	𰿦	𰿧	𰿨	𰿩	𰿪	𰿫	𰿬	𰿭	𰿮	𰿯
U+30FFx	𰿰	𰿱	𰿲	𰿳	𰿴	𰿵	𰿶	𰿷	𰿸	𰿹	𰿺	𰿻	𰿼	𰿽	𰿾	𰿿
U+3100x	𱀀	𱀁	𱀂	𱀃	𱀄	𱀅	𱀆	𱀇	𱀈	𱀉	𱀊	𱀋	𱀌	𱀍	𱀎	𱀏
U+3101x	𱀐	𱀑	𱀒	𱀓	𱀔	𱀕	𱀖	𱀗	𱀘	𱀙	𱀚	𱀛	𱀜	𱀝	𱀞	𱀟
U+3102x	𱀠	𱀡	𱀢	𱀣	𱀤	𱀥	𱀦	𱀧	𱀨	𱀩	𱀪	𱀫	𱀬	𱀭	𱀮	𱀯
U+3103x	𱀰	𱀱	𱀲	𱀳	𱀴	𱀵	𱀶	𱀷	𱀸	𱀹	𱀺	𱀻	𱀼	𱀽	𱀾	𱀿
U+3104x	𱁀	𱁁	𱁂	𱁃	𱁄	𱁅	𱁆	𱁇	𱁈	𱁉	𱁊	𱁋	𱁌	𱁍	𱁎	𱁏
U+3105x	𱁐	𱁑	𱁒	𱁓	𱁔	𱁕	𱁖	𱁗	𱁘	𱁙	𱁚	𱁛	𱁜	𱁝	𱁞	𱁟
U+3106x	𱁠	𱁡	𱁢	𱁣	𱁤	𱁥	𱁦	𱁧	𱁨	𱁩	𱁪	𱁫	𱁬	𱁭	𱁮	𱁯
U+3107x	𱁰	𱁱	𱁲	𱁳	𱁴	𱁵	𱁶	𱁷	𱁸	𱁹	𱁺	𱁻	𱁼	𱁽	𱁾	𱁿
U+3108x	𱂀	𱂁	𱂂	𱂃	𱂄	𱂅	𱂆	𱂇	𱂈	𱂉	𱂊	𱂋	𱂌	𱂍	𱂎	𱂏
U+3109x	𱂐	𱂑	𱂒	𱂓	𱂔	𱂕	𱂖	𱂗	𱂘	𱂙	𱂚	𱂛	𱂜	𱂝	𱂞	𱂟
U+310Ax	𱂠	𱂡	𱂢	𱂣	𱂤	𱂥	𱂦	𱂧	𱂨	𱂩	𱂪	𱂫	𱂬	𱂭	𱂮	𱂯
U+310Bx	𱂰	𱂱	𱂲	𱂳	𱂴	𱂵	𱂶	𱂷	𱂸	𱂹	𱂺	𱂻	𱂼	𱂽	𱂾	𱂿
U+310Cx	𱃀	𱃁	𱃂	𱃃	𱃄	𱃅	𱃆	𱃇	𱃈	𱃉	𱃊	𱃋	𱃌	𱃍	𱃎	𱃏
U+310Dx	𱃐	𱃑	𱃒	𱃓	𱃔	𱃕	𱃖	𱃗	𱃘	𱃙	𱃚	𱃛	𱃜	𱃝	𱃞	𱃟
U+310Ex	𱃠	𱃡	𱃢	𱃣	𱃤	𱃥	𱃦	𱃧	𱃨	𱃩	𱃪	𱃫	𱃬	𱃭	𱃮	𱃯
U+310Fx	𱃰	𱃱	𱃲	𱃳	𱃴	𱃵	𱃶	𱃷	𱃸	𱃹	𱃺	𱃻	𱃼	𱃽	𱃾	𱃿
U+3110x	𱄀	𱄁	𱄂	𱄃	𱄄	𱄅	𱄆	𱄇	𱄈	𱄉	𱄊	𱄋	𱄌	𱄍	𱄎	𱄏
U+3111x	𱄐	𱄑	𱄒	𱄓	𱄔	𱄕	𱄖	𱄗	𱄘	𱄙	𱄚	𱄛	𱄜	𱄝	𱄞	𱄟
U+3112x	𱄠	𱄡	𱄢	𱄣	𱄤	𱄥	𱄦	𱄧	𱄨	𱄩	𱄪	𱄫	𱄬	𱄭	𱄮	𱄯
U+3113x	𱄰	𱄱	𱄲	𱄳	𱄴	𱄵	𱄶	𱄷	𱄸	𱄹	𱄺	𱄻	𱄼	𱄽	𱄾	𱄿
U+3114x	𱅀	𱅁	𱅂	𱅃	𱅄	𱅅	𱅆	𱅇	𱅈	𱅉	𱅊	𱅋	𱅌	𱅍	𱅎	𱅏
U+3115x	𱅐	𱅑	𱅒	𱅓	𱅔	𱅕	𱅖	𱅗	𱅘	𱅙	𱅚	𱅛	𱅜	𱅝	𱅞	𱅟
U+3116x	𱅠	𱅡	𱅢	𱅣	𱅤	𱅥	𱅦	𱅧	𱅨	𱅩	𱅪	𱅫	𱅬	𱅭	𱅮	𱅯
U+3117x	𱅰	𱅱	𱅲	𱅳	𱅴	𱅵	𱅶	𱅷	𱅸	𱅹	𱅺	𱅻	𱅼	𱅽	𱅾	𱅿
U+3118x	𱆀	𱆁	𱆂	𱆃	𱆄	𱆅	𱆆	𱆇	𱆈	𱆉	𱆊	𱆋	𱆌	𱆍	𱆎	𱆏
U+3119x	𱆐	𱆑	𱆒	𱆓	𱆔	𱆕	𱆖	𱆗	𱆘	𱆙	𱆚	𱆛	𱆜	𱆝	𱆞	𱆟
U+311Ax	𱆠	𱆡	𱆢	𱆣	𱆤	𱆥	𱆦	𱆧	𱆨	𱆩	𱆪	𱆫	𱆬	𱆭	𱆮	𱆯
U+311Bx	𱆰	𱆱	𱆲	𱆳	𱆴	𱆵	𱆶	𱆷	𱆸	𱆹	𱆺	𱆻	𱆼	𱆽	𱆾	𱆿
U+311Cx	𱇀	𱇁	𱇂	𱇃	𱇄	𱇅	𱇆	𱇇	𱇈	𱇉	𱇊	𱇋	𱇌	𱇍	𱇎	𱇏
U+311Dx	𱇐	𱇑	𱇒	𱇓	𱇔	𱇕	𱇖	𱇗	𱇘	𱇙	𱇚	𱇛	𱇜	𱇝	𱇞	𱇟
U+311Ex	𱇠	𱇡	𱇢	𱇣	𱇤	𱇥	𱇦	𱇧	𱇨	𱇩	𱇪	𱇫	𱇬	𱇭	𱇮	𱇯
U+311Fx	𱇰	𱇱	𱇲	𱇳	𱇴	𱇵	𱇶	𱇷	𱇸	𱇹	𱇺	𱇻	𱇼	𱇽	𱇾	𱇿
U+3120x	𱈀	𱈁	𱈂	𱈃	𱈄	𱈅	𱈆	𱈇	𱈈	𱈉	𱈊	𱈋	𱈌	𱈍	𱈎	𱈏
U+3121x	𱈐	𱈑	𱈒	𱈓	𱈔	𱈕	𱈖	𱈗	𱈘	𱈙	𱈚	𱈛	𱈜	𱈝	𱈞	𱈟
U+3122x	𱈠	𱈡	𱈢	𱈣	𱈤	𱈥	𱈦	𱈧	𱈨	𱈩	𱈪	𱈫	𱈬	𱈭	𱈮	𱈯
U+3123x	𱈰	𱈱	𱈲	𱈳	𱈴	𱈵	𱈶	𱈷	𱈸	𱈹	𱈺	𱈻	𱈼	𱈽	𱈾	𱈿
U+3124x	𱉀	𱉁	𱉂	𱉃	𱉄	𱉅	𱉆	𱉇	𱉈	𱉉	𱉊	𱉋	𱉌	𱉍	𱉎	𱉏
U+3125x	𱉐	𱉑	𱉒	𱉓	𱉔	𱉕	𱉖	𱉗	𱉘	𱉙	𱉚	𱉛	𱉜	𱉝	𱉞	𱉟
U+3126x	𱉠	𱉡	𱉢	𱉣	𱉤	𱉥	𱉦	𱉧	𱉨	𱉩	𱉪	𱉫	𱉬	𱉭	𱉮	𱉯
U+3127x	𱉰	𱉱	𱉲	𱉳	𱉴	𱉵	𱉶	𱉷	𱉸	𱉹	𱉺	𱉻	𱉼	𱉽	𱉾	𱉿
U+3128x	𱊀	𱊁	𱊂	𱊃	𱊄	𱊅	𱊆	𱊇	𱊈	𱊉	𱊊	𱊋	𱊌	𱊍	𱊎	𱊏
U+3129x	𱊐	𱊑	𱊒	𱊓	𱊔	𱊕	𱊖	𱊗	𱊘	𱊙	𱊚	𱊛	𱊜	𱊝	𱊞	𱊟
U+312Ax	𱊠	𱊡	𱊢	𱊣	𱊤	𱊥	𱊦	𱊧	𱊨	𱊩	𱊪	𱊫	𱊬	𱊭	𱊮	𱊯
U+312Bx	𱊰	𱊱	𱊲	𱊳	𱊴	𱊵	𱊶	𱊷	𱊸	𱊹	𱊺	𱊻	𱊼	𱊽	𱊾	𱊿
U+312Cx	𱋀	𱋁	𱋂	𱋃	𱋄	𱋅	𱋆	𱋇	𱋈	𱋉	𱋊	𱋋	𱋌	𱋍	𱋎	𱋏
U+312Dx	𱋐	𱋑	𱋒	𱋓	𱋔	𱋕	𱋖	𱋗	𱋘	𱋙	𱋚	𱋛	𱋜	𱋝	𱋞	𱋟
U+312Ex	𱋠	𱋡	𱋢	𱋣	𱋤	𱋥	𱋦	𱋧	𱋨	𱋩	𱋪	𱋫	𱋬	𱋭	𱋮	𱋯
U+312Fx	𱋰	𱋱	𱋲	𱋳	𱋴	𱋵	𱋶	𱋷	𱋸	𱋹	𱋺	𱋻	𱋼	𱋽	𱋾	𱋿
U+3130x	𱌀	𱌁	𱌂	𱌃	𱌄	𱌅	𱌆	𱌇	𱌈	𱌉	𱌊	𱌋	𱌌	𱌍	𱌎	𱌏
U+3131x	𱌐	𱌑	𱌒	𱌓	𱌔	𱌕	𱌖	𱌗	𱌘	𱌙	𱌚	𱌛	𱌜	𱌝	𱌞	𱌟
U+3132x	𱌠	𱌡	𱌢	𱌣	𱌤	𱌥	𱌦	𱌧	𱌨	𱌩	𱌪	𱌫	𱌬	𱌭	𱌮	𱌯
U+3133x	𱌰	𱌱	𱌲	𱌳	𱌴	𱌵	𱌶	𱌷	𱌸	𱌹	𱌺	𱌻	𱌼	𱌽	𱌾	𱌿
U+3134x	𱍀	𱍁	𱍂	𱍃	𱍄	𱍅	𱍆	𱍇	𱍈	𱍉	𱍊					
Notes 1.As of Unicode version 17.0 2.Grey areas indicate non-assigned code points

== History ==
The following Unicode-related documents record the purpose and process of defining specific characters in the CJK Unified Ideographs Extension G block:

Version	Final code points (Note: Proposed code points and characters names may differ from final code points and names)	Count	L2 ID	WG2 ID	IRG ID	Document
13.0	U+30000..3134A	4,939	L2/12-333			West, Andrew (2012-10-19), Request to UTC to Propose 226 Characters for Inclusion in CJK Extension F
13.0	U+30000..3134A	4,939	L2/16-055			UTC Review Comments on CJK Working Set 2015 v1.1 (IRG N2133), 2016-02-12
13.0	U+30000..3134A	4,939			N2133_CC	UTC Responses to Consolidated Comments on IRGN2133 CJK2015v1.1, 2016-05-21
13.0	U+30000..3134A	4,939			N2133	Consolidated Comments on IRGN2133 CJK2015v1.1, May 2016
13.0	U+30000..3134A	4,939		N4953 (pdf, doc)		"M66.19m", Unconfirmed minutes of WG 2 meeting 66, 2018-03-23
13.0	U+30000..3134A	4,939		N4935		Concern about the quality of CJK unified ideographs extension G (CJK G) in PDAM2.2, 2018-02-21
13.0	U+30000..3134A	4,939		N5007.xls		CJK Extension G - IRGN2308IRG_Working_Set2015v6.0, 2018-06-11
13.0	U+30000..3134A	4,939	L2/18-268R		N2308R2	IRG Working Set 2015 Version 6.0 (IRG N2308) & Draft Extension G (WG2 N5006R) [31MB], 2018-09-18
13.0	U+30000..3134A	4,939	L2/18-272			Moore, Lisa (2018-10-29), "B.3.3 IRG Working Set 2015 Version 6.0 (IRG N2308) & Draft Extension G (WG2 N5006)", UTC #157 Minutes
13.0	U+30000..3134A	4,939		N5020 (pdf, doc)		Umamaheswaran, V. S. (2019-01-11), "9.2.1", Unconfirmed minutes of WG 2 meeting 67
13.0	U+30000..3134A	4,939			N2363	Editorial Report on IRG Working Set 2015 Version 7.0 (aka DRAFT Extension G), 2019-05-17
13.0	U+30000..3134A	4,939	L2/19-236	N5065	N2384	Chen, Zhuang (2019-05-24), Corrections to UCS6CD2 (ISO/IEC CD.2 10646 6th edition, CJK Ext G)
13.0	U+30000..3134A	4,939		N5096		Kim, Kyongsok; Pyo, Seungju; Shin, Sanghyun; Cho, Sungduk (2019-06-12), Change of 4 KR (K) glyphs in Ext. G (WS 2015)
13.0	U+30000..3134A	4,939		N5122		"M68.01 and M68.06", Unconfirmed minutes of WG 2 meeting 68, 2019-12-31
13.0	U+30000..3134A	4,939	L2/19-243	N5106		Suignard, Michel (2019-06-20), "T5", Disposition of comments on ISO/IEC CD.2 10646 6th edition
13.0	U+30000..3134A	4,939	L2/19-270			Moore, Lisa (2019-10-07), "Consensus 160-C18", UTC #160 Minutes
13.0	U+30000..3134A	4,939		N5124R		Suignard, Michel (2019-12-12), Disposition of comments on ISO/IEC CD.3 10646 6th edition
13.0	U+30000..3134A	4,939	L2/22-077		N2512R	Shin, SangHyun; Cho, Sungduk; Kim, Kyongsok (2021-11-02), A revised proposal requesting a Horizontal Extension of 51 Hanja chars (previously submitted for ExtF/G/H) [Affects U+302FC, 30723, 30A6D, 30CF7, 30DBF, 31006, and 3105D]
13.0	U+30000..3134A	4,939	L2/22-067			Lunde, Ken (2022-04-16), "19 [Affects U+302FC, 30723, 30A6D, 30CF7, 30DBF, 31006, and 3105D]", CJK & Unihan Group Recommendations for UTC #171 Meeting
13.0	U+30000..3134A	4,939	L2/22-061			Constable, Peter (2022-07-27), "E.1 Section 19 [Affects U+302FC, 30723, 30A6D, 30CF7, 30DBF, 31006, and 3105D]", Approved Minutes of UTC Meeting 171
13.0	U+30000..3134A	4,939	L2/22-258			Shin, SangHyun; Kim, Kyongsok (2022-10-14), Changing glyphs and IDSs of 97 KR Hanja chars containing '叱 (U+53F1)' [Affects U+301D4, 301D9, 301E4, 301E8, 301FF, 30200, 30205, 3020C, 30211, 30215, 30216, 30217, 30220, 30234, 30235, and 30237]
13.0	U+30000..3134A	4,939	L2/22-257			Suzuki, Toshiya (2022-10-24), An item WG2 N5194 requests a feedback from IRG [Affects 31F68]
13.0	U+30000..3134A	4,939	L2/22-247			Lunde, Ken (2022-11-01), "23) L2/22-257 and 25) L2/22-258", CJK & Unihan Group Recommendations for UTC #173 Meeting
13.0	U+30000..3134A	4,939	L2/22-241			Constable, Peter (2022-11-09), "E.1 23) L2/22-257 and E.1 25) L2/22-258", Approved Minutes of UTC Meeting 173
