= Paomo =

Chinese traditional dish from Xi'an

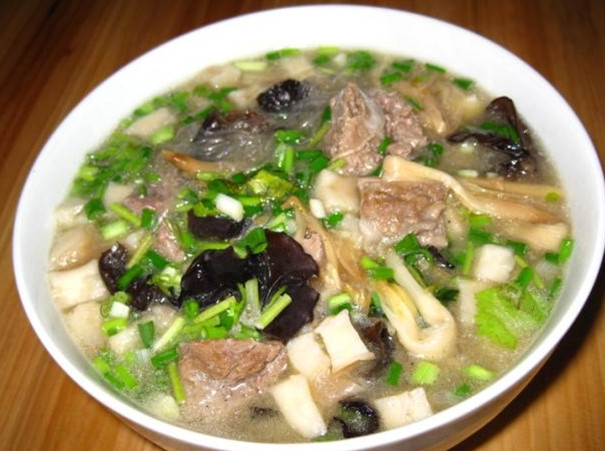
- Lamb paomo
- Traditional Chinese: 泡饃
- Simplified Chinese: 泡馍
- Literal meaning: soaked flatbread
Transcriptions
Standard Mandarin
- Hanyu Pinyin: pàomó

Paomo
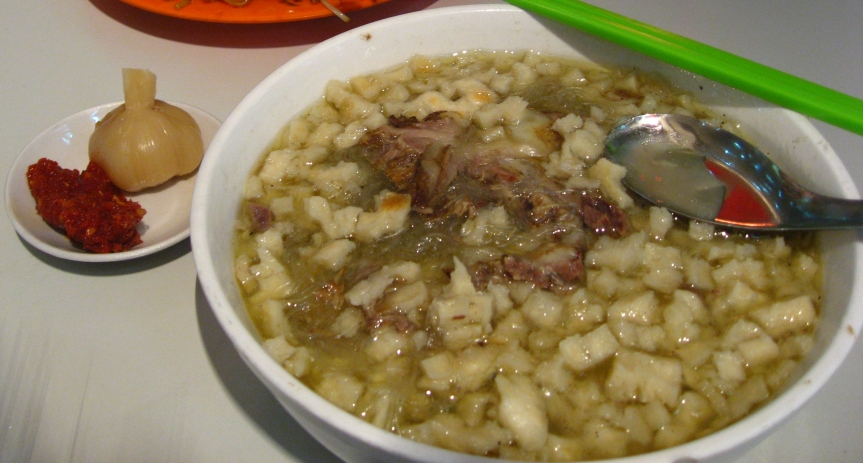
- A bowl of paomo served in the cafeteria of Xi'an Jiaotong University
- Type: Stew
- Place of origin: China
- Region or state: Shaanxi
- Main ingredients: Bread, lamb broth, lamb meat

Paomo is a popular specialty of Shaanxi cuisine common throughout Xi'an and other cities of Guanzhong. It is a hot stew made with pieces of baked wheat flatbread, known regionally as mo (饃; 馍; mó), cooked and served with lamb or beef.

Lamb paomo (羊肉泡饃; 羊肉泡馍; yángròu pàomó) is made with lamb soup and pieces of baked wheat flatbread. When making this dish, the cook breaks the bread into small pieces and adds them to the lamb soup. The beef version is beef paomo (牛肉泡饃; 牛肉泡馍; niúròu pàomó). Paomo is often eaten with pickled garlic and chili sauce.

== Production ==
The mo used in paomo is a round wheat flatbread made with a small amount of leavened dough and cooked on an iron griddle. Lamb or beef is boiled with bones, Sichuan pepper, star anise, tsaoko, cinnamon, and other spices until the meat is tender and the broth is done. In traditional restaurants, customers must break up the bread themselves first into thumb-sized chunks before handing it back to the chef. The restaurant then boils the broth, thins it with hot water, and adds in the prepared meat along with cellophane noodles. After the soup is heated up, the broken-up bread is added in before being topped off with spices and a drizzle of lamb oil. Customers may then add chili oil, cilantro, or garlic to their liking. The garlic is sometimes pickled in a sour-sweet vinegar and sugar concoction.

== Gallery ==
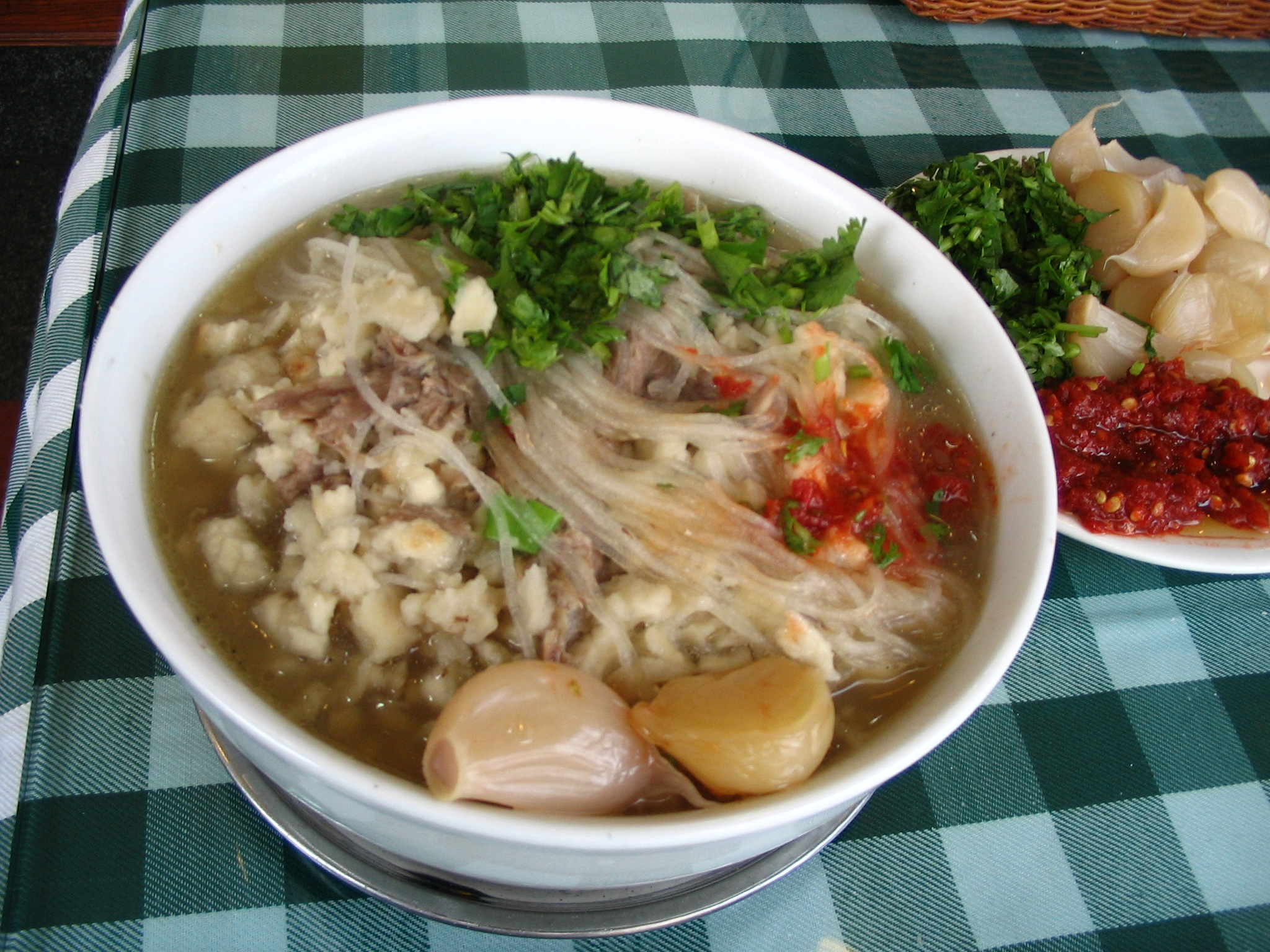
Prepared lamb paomo

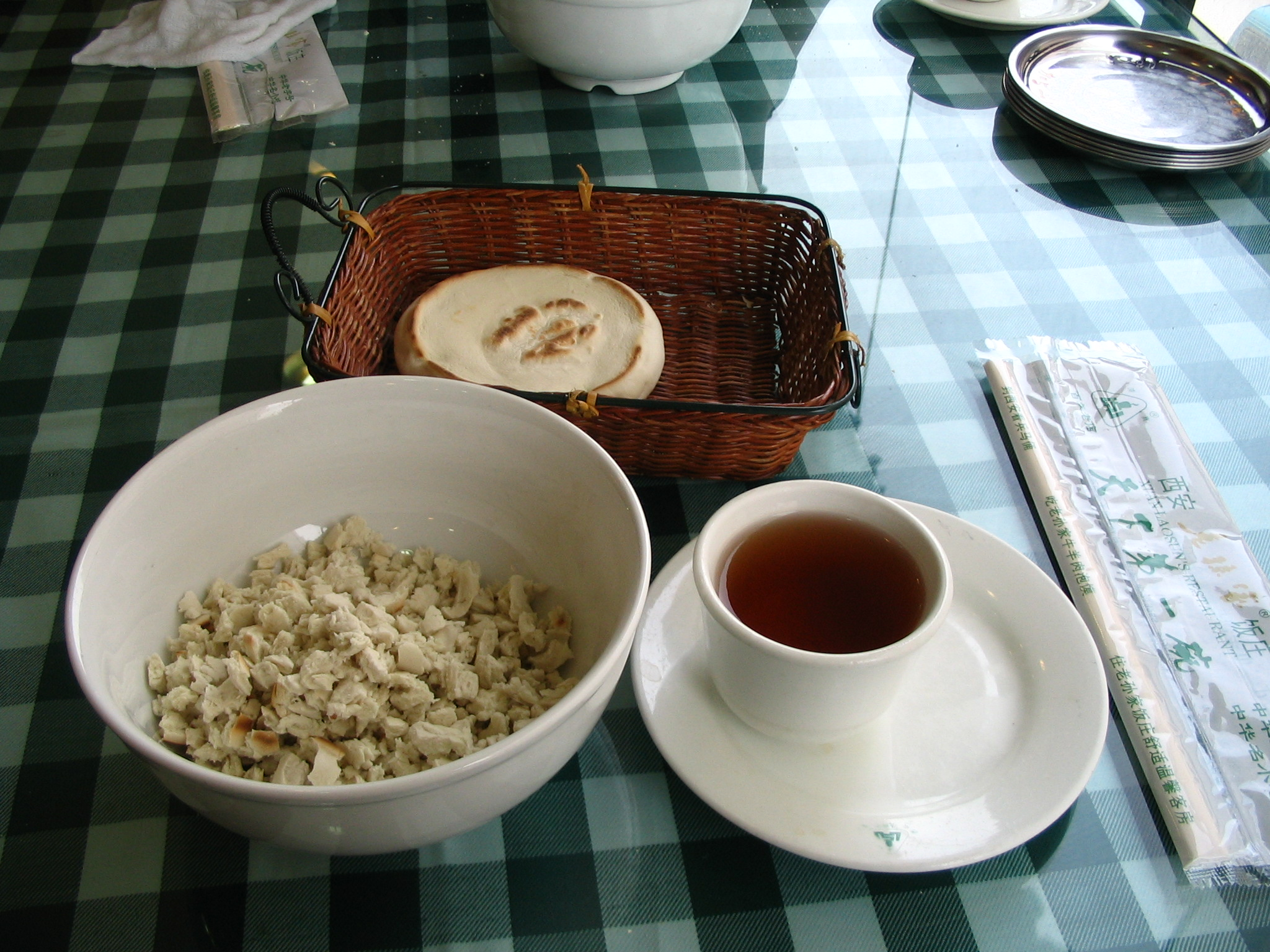
The mo before and after it is broken up

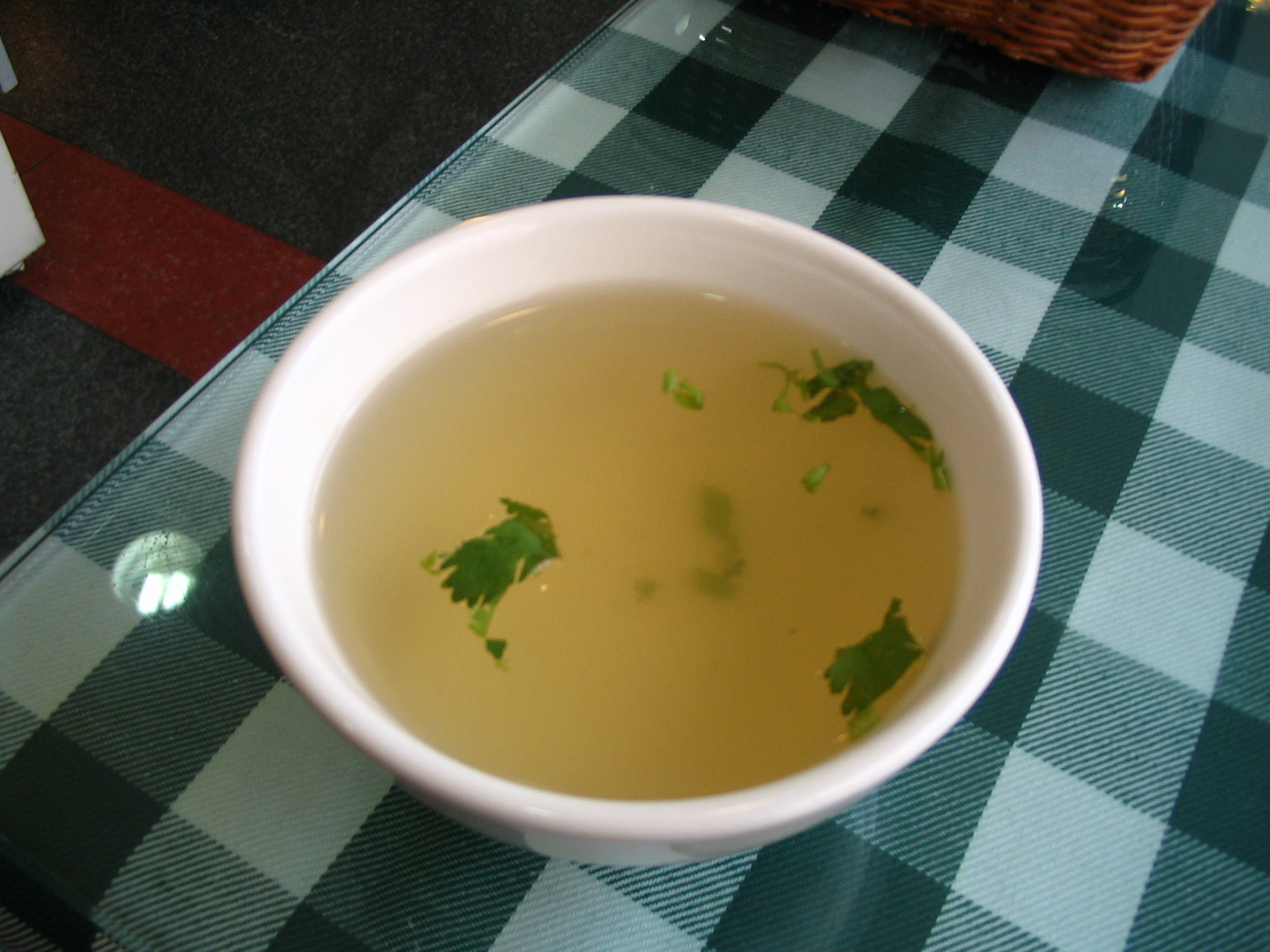
The broth used in paomo

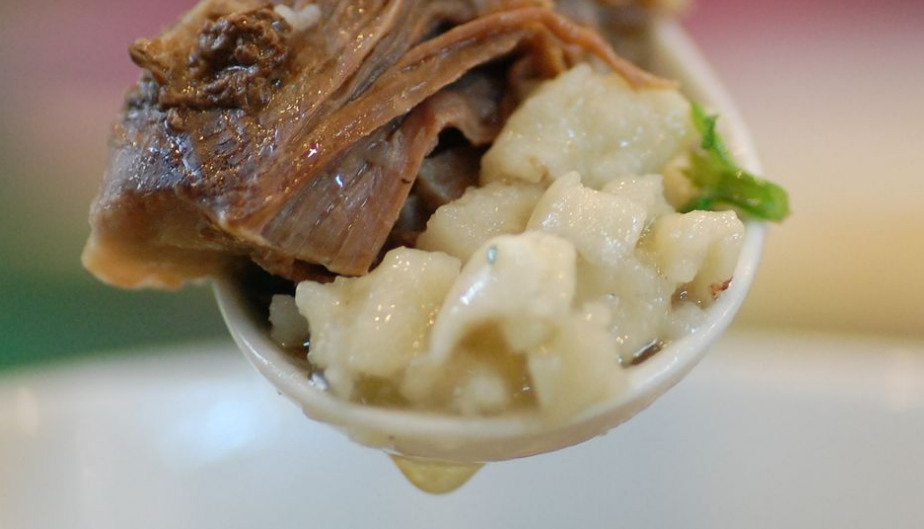
A spoonful of meat and paomo

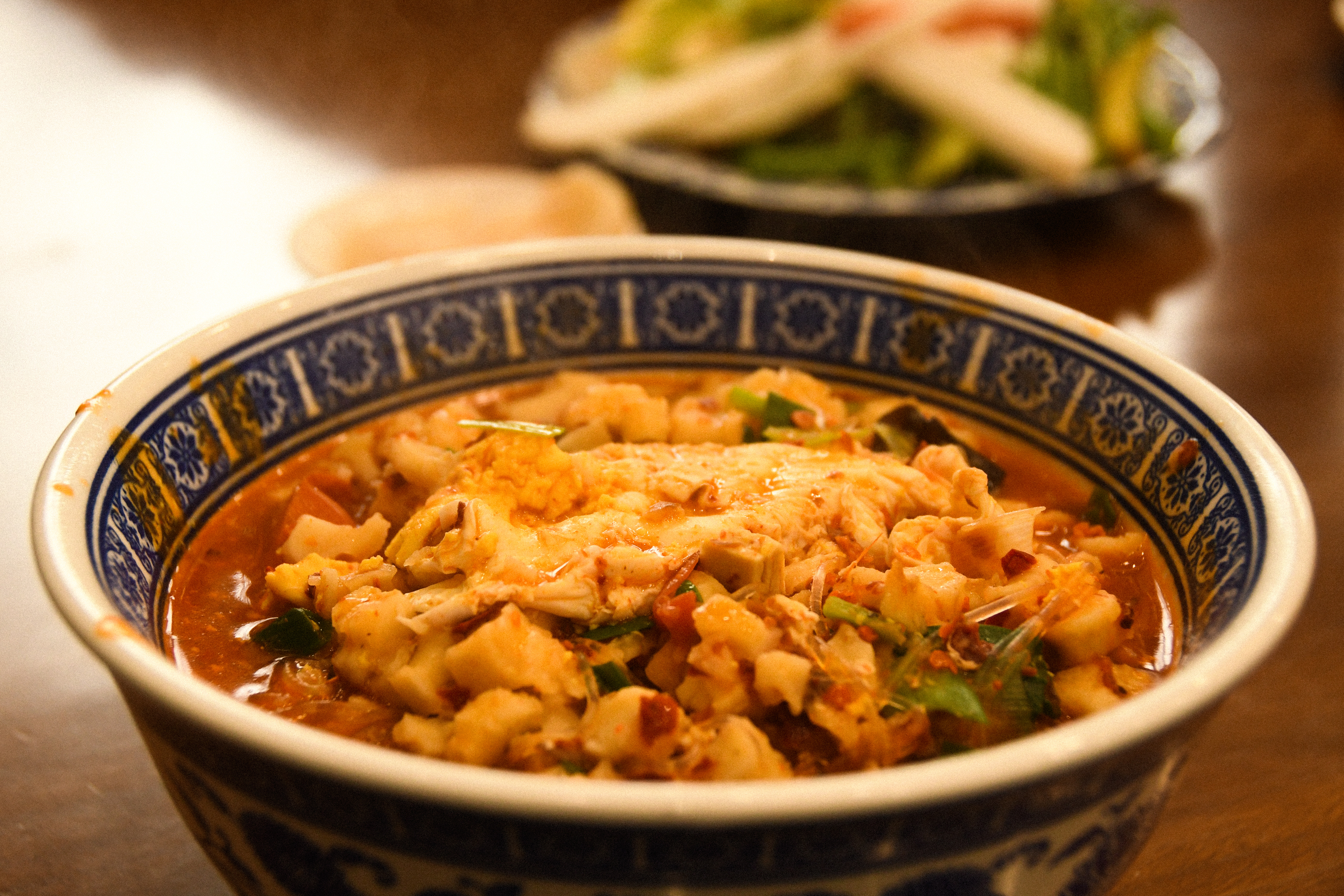
Beef paomo

== Legends ==
One folktale about its origin is that in the late Five Dynasties and Ten Kingdoms period, Zhao Kuangyin, the Song dynasty's first emperor, returned to his hometown after seeing his betrothed. He had finished up most of his supply on the way back. He had only two pieces of dried plain pancake. He went through a merchant selling lamb soup; Zhao tore the bread into little pieces and mixed it into the soup.

After Zhao Kuangyin became the emperor, he returned to the small merchant place and asked the chief to make the soup again. After eating this old flavor, the freshness and the old memory intertwined in his heart. He named it "lamb paomo."

== See also ==
- List of lamb dishes
- List of stews
- List of soups
