= Shaanxi cuisine =

Culinary traditions of Shaanxi province, China

- Traditional Chinese: 陝西菜
- Simplified Chinese: 陕西菜
Transcriptions
Standard Mandarin
- Hanyu Pinyin: Shǎnxī cài

Qin cuisine
- Chinese: 秦菜
Transcriptions
Standard Mandarin
- Hanyu Pinyin: Qín cài

Shaanxi cuisine, or Qin cuisine, is derived from the native cooking styles of Shaanxi Province and parts of northwestern China.

== Description ==
Shaanxi cuisine makes elaborate use of ordinary ingredients and is characterized by its noodles, lamb/mutton dishes, and heavy use of strong and complex savory flavors such as salt, garlic, onion and vinegar. Sugar is rarely used. The main cooking methods are steaming, frying and stir-frying.

Due to its geographical location between the provinces of Shanxi and Sichuan, the flavors of Shaanxi cuisine include both sour and spicy of Szechuan flavors and the salty flavors of Shanxi. Shaanxi cuisine's primary flavor profile is "fragrant spicy" (香辣).

Shaanxi cuisine uses more noodles than other Chinese cuisines, but Shaanxi noodles are almost always thicker and longer than those of Beijing cuisine, and to a lesser degree, Shanxi cuisine, especially the Biangbiang ones.

The taste of Shaanxi cuisine can be quite spicy. However, this can be diluted by adding soy sauce. Many different types of meat are used in Shaanxi cuisine such as duck, lamb, chicken, and beef. Additionally, there are spiced, vegetarian dishes where no meat is included, resulting in these dishes being considerably spicier.

== Regional styles ==
Shaanxi cuisine includes three regional styles:

- Northern Shaanxi style is characterized by the wide use of steaming as the method of cooking. The most common meat is pork, although lamb and mutton are also popular. Beans and soups are also enjoyed by many.
- Guanzhong style, which uses pork and lamb / mutton equally with heavy meaty flavors and tastes.
- Hanzhong style, similar to Szechuan, is marked by spiciness.

== Dishes ==
The following is a selected list of dishes in Shaanxi cuisine.

English	Chinese (Simplified; Traditional)	Pinyin	Image	Notes
Biangbiang noodles	𰻞𰻞面; 𰻞𰻞麵	biángbiáng miàn		Notable for its name being written with one of the most complex characters used in modern Chinese.
Crispy fried noodles	金线油塔; 金線油塔	jīn xiàn yóu tǎ		
Cured beef and lamb	腊牛羊肉; 臘牛羊肉	là niú yáng ròu		
Gourd head	葫芦头; 葫蘆頭	húlu tóu		A dish made from pig's large intestine. It is called "gourd head" because the pig's large intestine looks like the top of a gourd. It originated as street food during the Northern Song dynasty. Since then, the dish has evolved to include variations with meat fillings inside the pig's large intestine, as well as the inclusion of other ingredients. Pictured with bottle of Ice Peak soda.
Guokui	锅盔; 鍋盔	guōkuī		A kind of pancake made from flour. It is round in shape, about a foot long in diameter, an inch in thickness, and weighs roughly 2.5 kg. It is traditionally presented as a gift by a grandmother to her grandson when he turns one month old.
Hanzhong hot rice noodles	汉中热米皮; 漢中熱米皮	Hànzhōng rè mǐ pí		
Lamb paomo	羊肉泡馍; 羊肉泡饃	yáng ròu pào mó		Bread is shredded into pieces and placed in a boiling beef or mutton broth before serving.
Lamb soup	水盆羊肉	shuǐ pén yáng ròu		
Mingsixi	明四喜	míng sì xǐ		As Shaanxi is located far away from the coast, seafood is hardly featured in Shaanxi cuisine. This dish, composed of ingredients such as abalone, sea cucumber, squid, Shaohsing wine and clear chicken broth, is served only at major banquets and festivals in Shaanxi.
Qishan saozi noodles	岐山臊子面; 岐山臊子麵	Qíshān sàozǐ miàn		
Zenggao	甑糕	zèng gāo (Note: Locally, it is pronounced jìng gāo.)		A type of cake (糕; gāo) made from fully-soaked glutinous rice, peeled dates and kidney beans. It is historically made with an ancient Chinese steam cooker known as Zèng (甑), hence the name.
Roujiamo	肉夹馍; 肉夾饃	ròujiāmó; ròugāmó		Often called "Chinese hamburgers", this famous Shaanxi dish can now be found everywhere in China.
Shaanxi-style liangpi	陕西凉皮; 陝西涼皮	Shǎnxī liángpí		Cold wheat noodles with a chili and vinegar sauce.
Hulatang	胡辣汤; 胡辣湯	hú là tāng		Originating from Henan, Hulatang is a rich, peppery soup, widely popular in Xi'an. The Xi'anese variant of this soup additionally includes meatballs, potatoes and carrots among other ingredients.
Vermicelli in lamb's blood soup	粉汤羊血; 粉湯羊血	fěn tāng yáng xiě		A soup composed of ingredients such as congealed lamb's blood, paomo and other condiments. It is eaten with vermicelli and cilantro.
