= Biangbiang noodles =

Type of Chinese noodles from Shaanxi

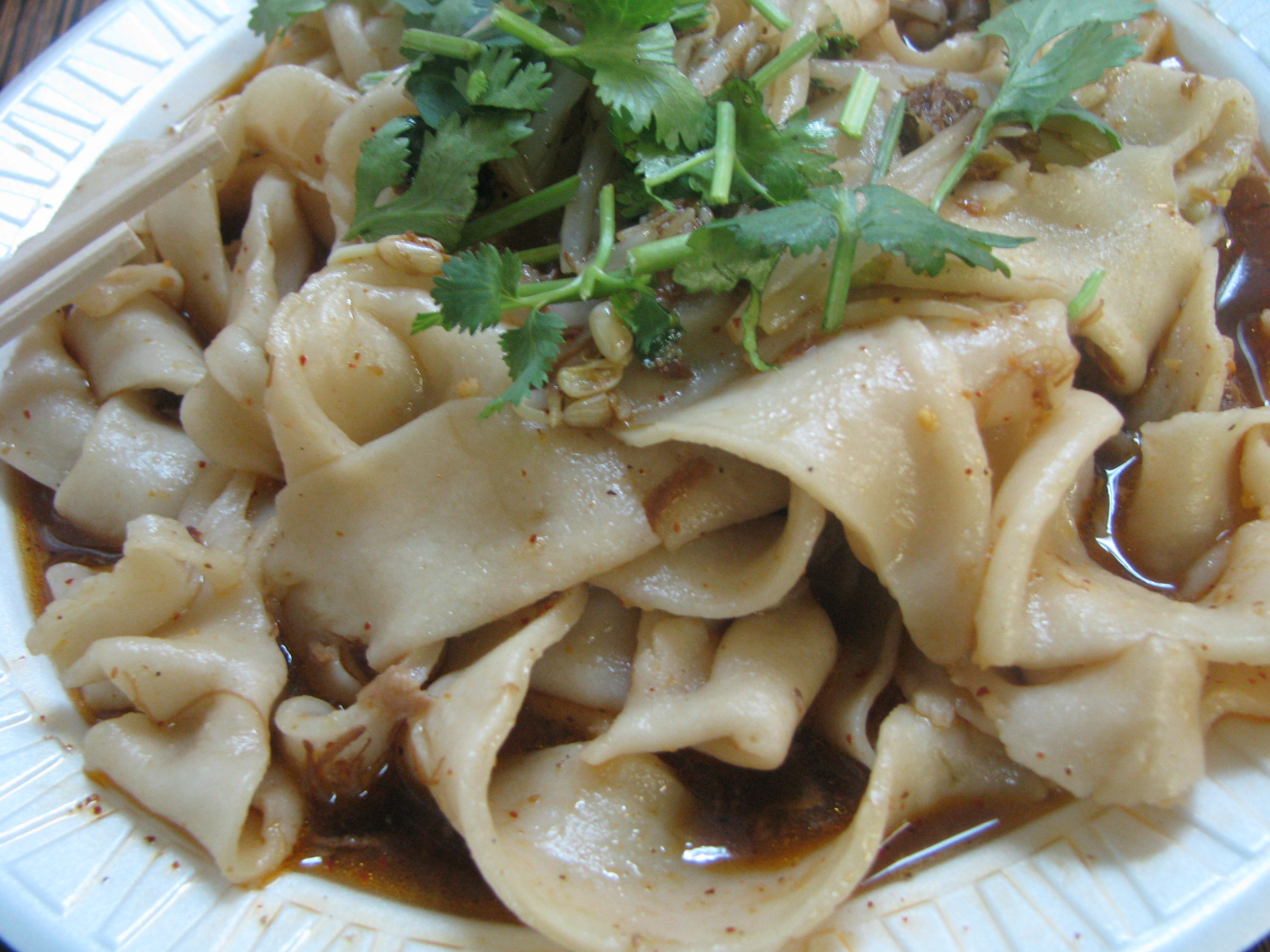
- Type: Chinese noodles
- Place of origin: China
- Region or state: Shaanxi

Biangbiang noodles
- Traditional Chinese: 𰻞𰻞麵 / 麵
- Simplified Chinese: 𰻝𰻝面 / 面
- Hanyu Pinyin: biángbiáng miàn
Transcriptions
Standard Mandarin
- Hanyu Pinyin: biángbiáng miàn
- Bopomofo: ㄅㄧㄤˊ ㄅㄧㄤˊ ㄇㄧㄢˋ
- Gwoyeu Romatzyh: byangbyang miann
- Wade–Giles: piang^{2}-piang^{2}-mien^{4}
- Yale Romanization: byángbyáng myàn
- IPA: [pjǎŋ.pjǎŋ.mjɛ̂n]

Alternative Chinese name
- Traditional Chinese: 油潑扯麵
- Simplified Chinese: 油泼扯面
- Hanyu Pinyin: yóupō chěmiàn
- Literal meaning: oil-splashed hand-pulled noodles
Transcriptions
Standard Mandarin
- Hanyu Pinyin: yóupō chěmiàn
- Bopomofo: ㄧㄡˊ ㄆㄛ ㄔㄜˇ ㄇㄧㄢˋ
- Gwoyeu Romatzyh: youpo cheemiann
- Wade–Giles: yu^{2}-pʻo^{1} chʻê^{3}-mien^{4}
- Yale Romanization: yóupwō chěmyàn
- IPA: [jǒʊ.pʰwó ʈʂʰɤ̀.mjɛ̂n]

Biangbiang noodles (simplified Chinese: 𰻝𰻝面; traditional Chinese: 𰻞𰻞麵; pinyin: Biángbiángmiàn), alternatively known as yóupō chěmiàn (油泼扯面; 油潑扯麵) in Chinese, are a type of Chinese noodle originating from Shaanxi cuisine. The noodles, touted as one of the "Eight Curiosities of Shaanxi" (陕西八大怪; 陝西八大怪; Shǎnxī bā dà guài), are described as being like a belt, owing to their thickness and length.

Biangbiang noodles are renowned for being written using a unique character. The character is unusually complex, with the standard variant of its traditional form containing 58 strokes.

== Noodles ==
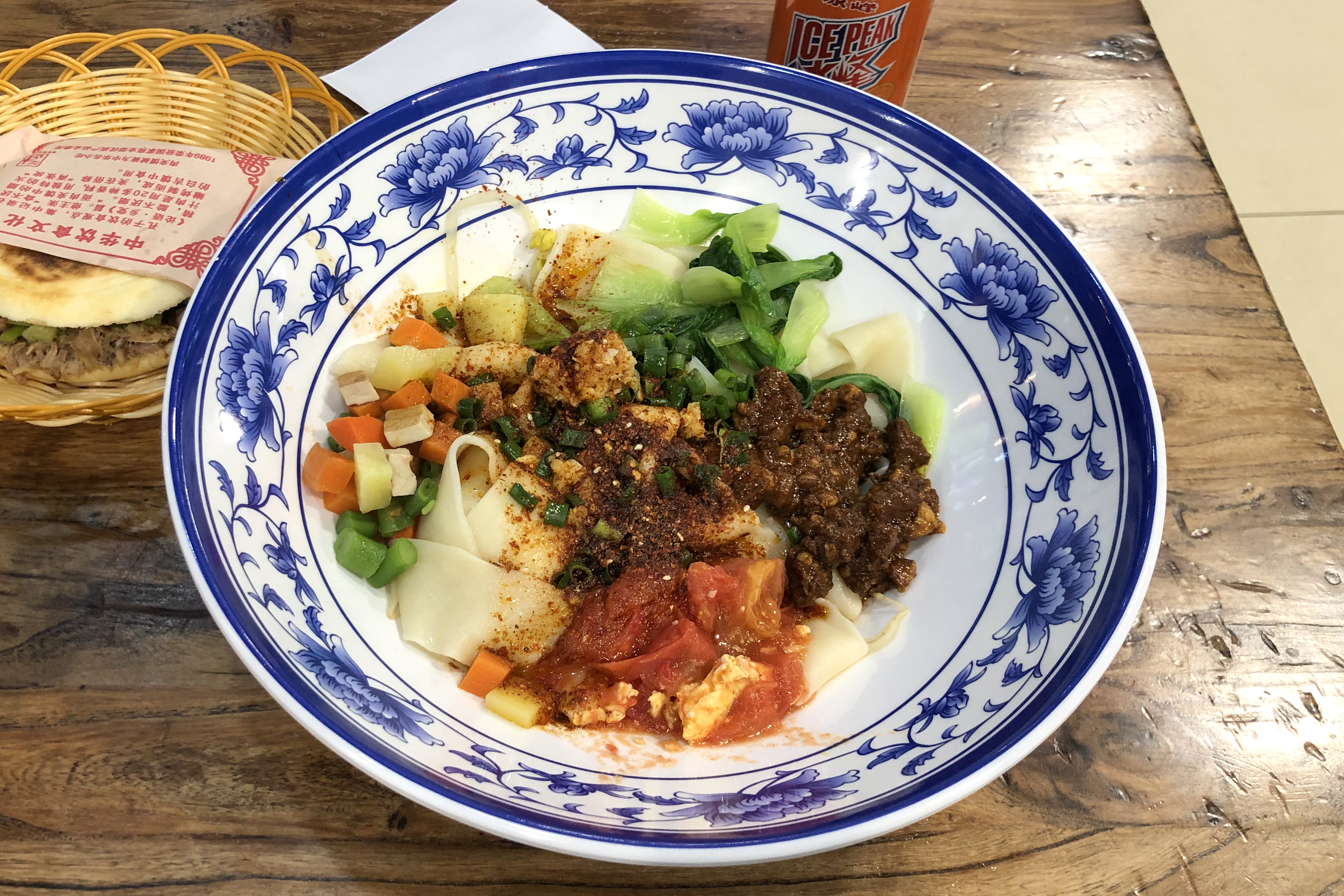
Biangbiang noodles served in Beijing

The noodles are thick and belt-like, and are usually hand-made. For most of their existence, they have been an obscure dish local to Xi'an, eaten by workers lacking the time to make thinner noodles. More recently, the noodles have become more widely known across China, in a rise driven to some extent by social media interest in the esoteric character used to write biáng.

The word biáng is an onomatopoeia being said to resemble the sound of the thick noodle dough hitting a work surface.

== Chinese character for biáng ==
The Traditional character for biáng in calligraphic regular script

The Traditional character for biáng in a Song font

The Simplified character for biáng in a Song font

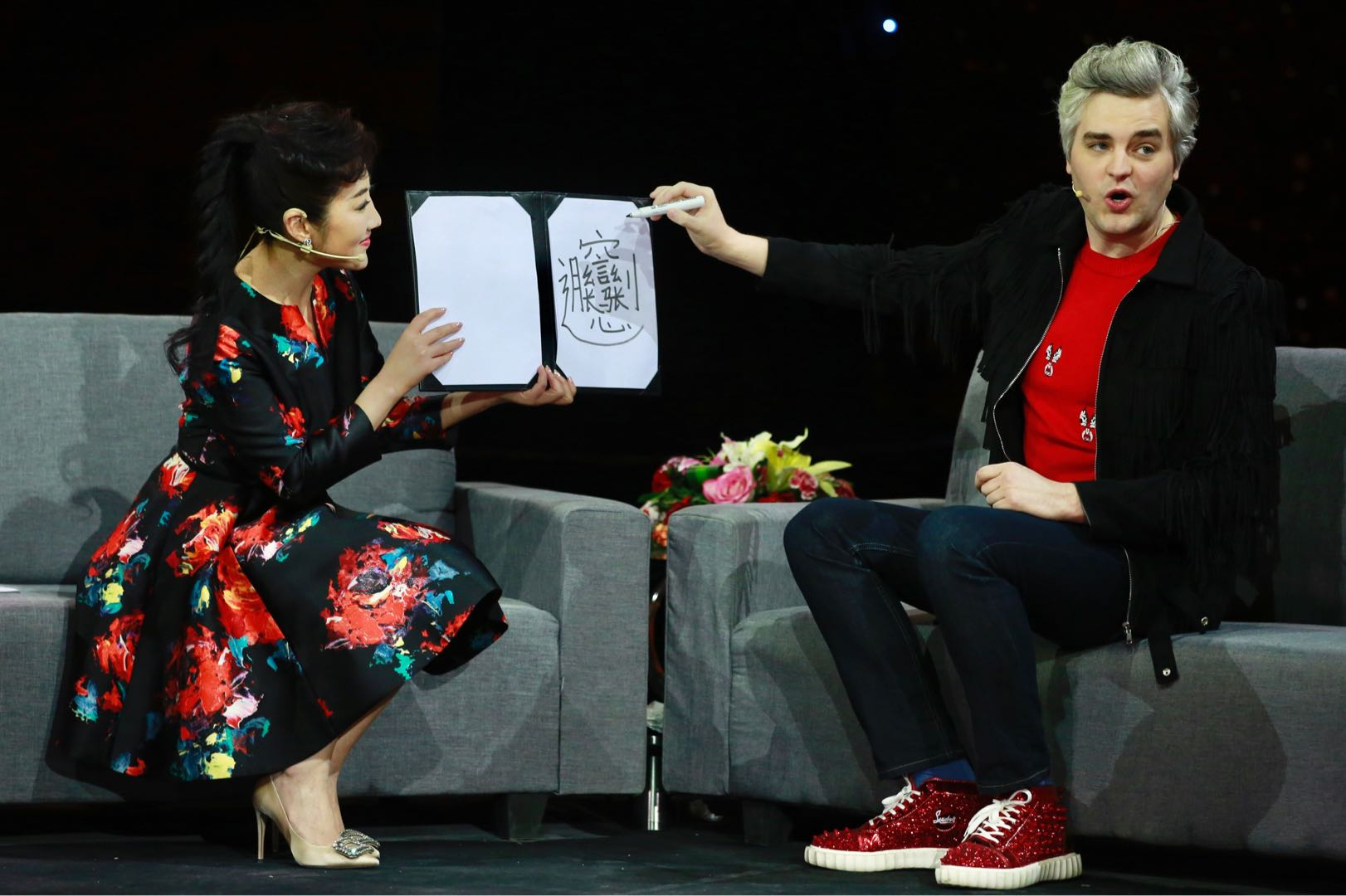
American singer and TV personality in China Slater Rhea (帅德) writes and explains a biáng character on Xi'an TV.

There are many variations of the character for biáng, but the most widely accepted version is made up of 58 strokes in its traditional form (Note: The radical 辶 has only three strokes instead of four according to Mainland Chinese stroke order, so the traditional character is written with only 57 strokes there. This is reflected in the graphics of the Song style character and the stroke order animation to the right.) (42 in simplified Chinese). It is one of the most complex Chinese characters in modern usage, although it is not found in modern dictionaries or even in the Kangxi dictionary.

The character is composed of 言 (speak; 7 strokes) in the middle flanked by 幺 (tiny; 2 × 3 strokes) on both sides. Below it, 馬 (horse; 10 strokes) is similarly flanked by 長 (grow; 2 × 8 strokes). This central block itself is surrounded by 月 (moon; 4 strokes) to the left, 心 (heart; 4 strokes) below, and刂 (knife; 2 strokes) to the right. These in turn are surrounded by a second layer of characters, namely 穴 (cave; 5 strokes) on the top and 辶 (walk; 4 strokes) curving around the left and bottom.

=== Computer entry and phonetic substitution ===
Both the traditional and simplified Chinese characters for biáng were encoded in Unicode, on 20 March 2020, for Unicode 13.0.0. The code point is U+30EDE for the traditional form (𰻞) and U+30EDD for the simplified form (𰻝).

Until that point, there were no standardized ways of entering or representing them on computers. Both traditional and simplified forms had been submitted to the Ideographic Rapporteur Group for inclusion in CJK Unified Ideographs Extension G. As the characters are not widely available on computers (and not supported by many fonts), images of the characters, phonetic substitutes like 彪彪面 (biāobiāomiàn) or 冰冰面 (bīngbīng miàn), as well as the pinyin, are often used instead.

The character is described by the following ideographic description sequences (IDSs):

⿺‌辶⿱穴⿱⿲月⿱⿲幺言幺⿲長馬長刂心 (traditional)
⿺‌辶⿱穴⿱⿲月⿱⿲幺言幺⿲長马長刂心 (cantonese)
⿺‌辶⿱穴⿱⿲月⿱⿲幺言幺⿲长马长刂心 (simplified)

In Adobe's Source Han Sans (prior to 2.002) and Source Han Serif font these IDS sequences do not display as IDS sequences, but display the actual glyphs for the character.

==== Unicode ====
After an email discussion with Lee Collins, John Jenkins submitted an application of "" in 2006. However, its IDS was longer than the length permissible under Unicode's IDS specifications and "radical 心 (heart)" was missing from the character shape.

Ming Fan (范銘) submitted an application to the Unicode Consortium. In WS2015, the traditional character had a code of UTC-00791 and the simplified character had a code of UTC-01312.

However, the evidence for this character does not fully match the character shape. For UTC-00791, "radical 刂 (knife)" has disappeared from the dictionary (which is used as evidence). For UTC-01312, "radical 刂 (knife)" has become "radical 戈 (dagger-axe)" in the academic paper used as evidence. Members of the Unicode Consortium supported the character shape. In a proposal submitted on April 1st, Toshiya Suzuki suggested creating a new block ("CJK Complex Ideographic Symbols") and encoding "" as a generic character covering all possible variations, including the theoretical "".

The character's traditional and simplified forms were added to Unicode version 13.0 in March 2020 in the CJK Unified Ideographs Extension G block of the newly allocated Tertiary Ideographic Plane, the finalized form of WS2015. The corresponding Unicode characters are:

- Traditional: U+30EDE 𰻞
- Simplified: U+30EDD 𰻝

=== Mnemonics ===
Animated GIF showing the stroke order of the Traditional character for biáng according to the mnemonic

There are a number of mnemonics used by Shaanxi residents to aid recall of how the character is written.

One version runs as follows:

Traditional Chinese	Simplified Chinese	Pinyin	English translation
一點上了天	一点上了天	yī diǎn shàng le tiān	A dot (丶) rises to the sky,
黃河兩道彎	黄河两道弯	huáng hé liǎng dào wān	Over two bends (冖) by Huanghe's side.
八字大張口	八字大张口	bā zì dà zhāng kǒu	An eight (八) opens wide,
言字往進走	言字往进走	yán zì wǎng jìn zǒu	Speech (言) enters inside.
你一扭 我一扭	你一扭 我一扭	nǐ yī niǔ, wǒ yī niǔ	You twist, I twist too, (幺 'tiny')
你一長 我一長	你一长 我一长	nǐ yī zhǎng, wǒ yī zhǎng	you grow, I grow (長) with you.
當中加個馬大王	当中加个马大王	dāng zhōng jiā gè mǎ dà wáng	Inside, a horse (馬) king will rule.
心字底	心字底	xīn zì dǐ	A heart (心) below,
月字旁	月字旁	yuè zì páng	A moon (月) by the side,
留個鈎搭掛麻糖	留个钩搭挂麻糖	liú ge gōu dā guà má tang	A hook (刂 'knife') for matang to hang low,
坐着車車逛咸陽	坐着车车逛咸阳	zuò zhe chē chē guàng xián yáng	On our carriage, to Xianyang we'll ride. (radical: 辶 'walk')

=== Origin of the character ===
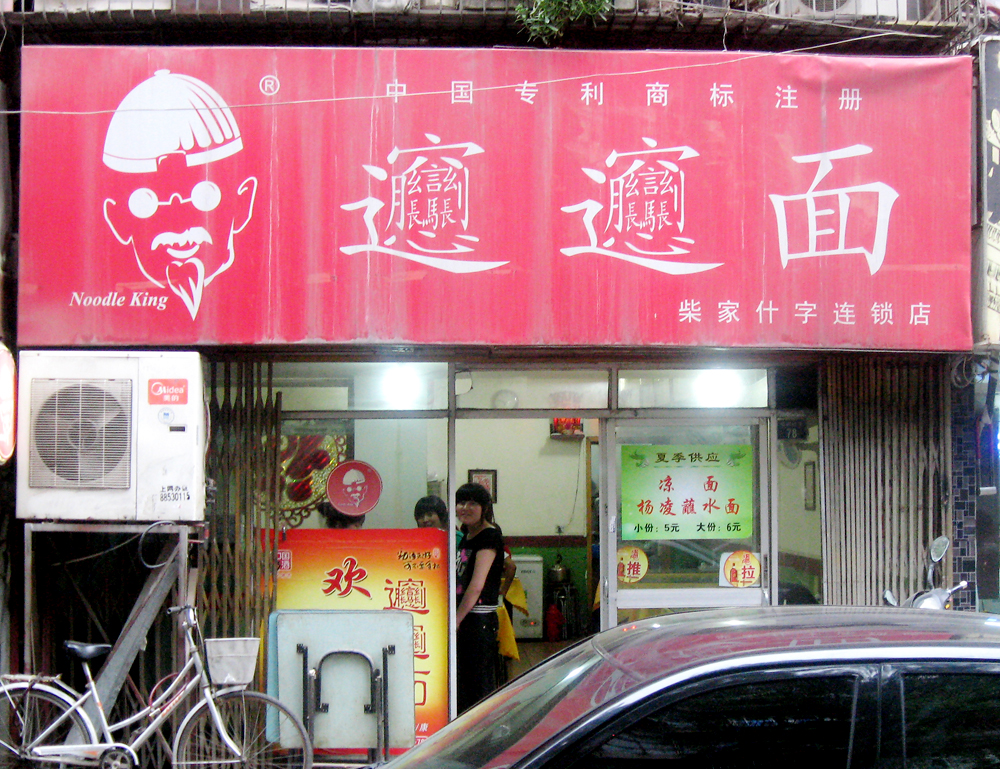
A Xi'an biangbiang noodle restaurant. The Traditional character for biáng is combined with the Simplified character for miàn.

The origins of the biangbiang noodles and the character biáng are unclear. In one version of the story, the character biáng was invented by the Qin dynasty Premier Li Si. However, since the character is not found in the Kangxi Dictionary, it may have been created much later than the time of Li Si. Similar characters were found used by Tiandihui.

In the 2007 season of the TVB show The Web (一網打盡), the show's producers tried to find the origin of the character by contacting university professors, but they could not verify the Li Si story or the origin of the character. It was concluded that the character was invented by a noodle shop.

A legend about a student fabricating a character for the noodle to get out of a biangbiang noodle bill also is a commonly believed hypothesis about the origin of the character.

According to a China Daily article, the word "biang" is an onomatopoeia that actually refers to the sound made by the chef when he creates the noodles by pulling the dough and slapping it on the table.

=== Variants ===
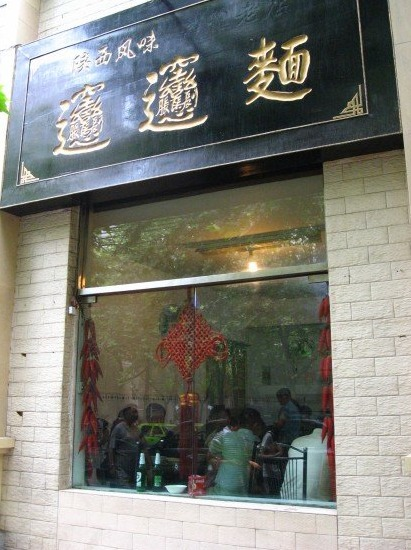
Biángbiáng miàn in Traditional characters. With exception of the fourth and fifth strokes, the variant of biáng used is the same as the third variant on the list.

More than twenty variants of the Traditional character for biáng, having between 56 and 71 (Note: The radical 辶 has only three strokes instead of four according to Mainland Chinese stroke order, so the variant with 70 strokes is written with only 69 strokes there. This is reflected in the graphics of the characters below.) strokes: (Apart from the original character and its simplified form, these variants are not yet registered in Unicode.)

== See also ==
- Taito (kanji)
