= 煎餅 =

Chinese name
- Traditional Chinese: 煎餅
- Simplified Chinese: 煎饼
Transcriptions
Standard Mandarin
- Hanyu Pinyin: jiānbǐng

Japanese name
- Kanji: 煎餅
Transcriptions
- Romanization: senbei

煎餅 (traditional Chinese and Japanese: 煎餅; simplified Chinese: 煎饼; pinyin: jiānbǐng; rōmaji: senbei) may refer to:

- Jianbing, a type of Chinese egg flat bread
- Senbei, a type of Japanese rice cracker

== See also ==
- 煎
  - The dictionary definition of 煎 at Wiktionary
- 餅 (disambiguation)
  - The dictionary definition of 餅 at Wiktionary
- 饼
  - The dictionary definition of 饼 at Wiktionary
- The dictionary definition of 煎饼 at Wiktionary
