= Bing Boy =

Australian restaurant chain

- Type: Company-owned and franchise stores
- Industry: Restaurant
- Founded: 25 June 2011 in Adelaide, Australia
- Founder: Ming Ma
- Products: Urban Asian street food

Bing Boy is an Australian chain of urban Asian street food restaurants, founded in Adelaide, Australia in 2011. The chain specialises in jianbing (also called Chinese crepes).

The first Bing Boy store was opened in Southern Cross Arcade at Rundle Mall, Adelaide, in June 2011. Founder Ming Ma modeled Bing Boy on the concept of fresh, fast delivery of jianbing that he says is common in China. At Bing Boy stores, bings made of traditional thin wheat omelette with various fillings, are made in full view of patrons.

The first Melbourne Bing Boy opened in November 2012. By December 2014, the chain had 12 stores in South Australia, 18 in Victoria and three in Queensland. The first Perth store opened in December 2014. However, as of February 2026, the majority of stores have closed.

== See also ==
- South Australian food and drink
