= 餅 =

餅 may refer to:

- Bing (Chinese flatbread), dough-based Chinese flatbreads, pancakes, and other unleavened baked goods
- Mochi, a Japanese rice cake made of glutinous rice pounded into paste and molded into shape
- Bánh, a Vietnamese word often loosely translated as either "cake" or "bread"
