= Donkey meat =

Meat from a donkey

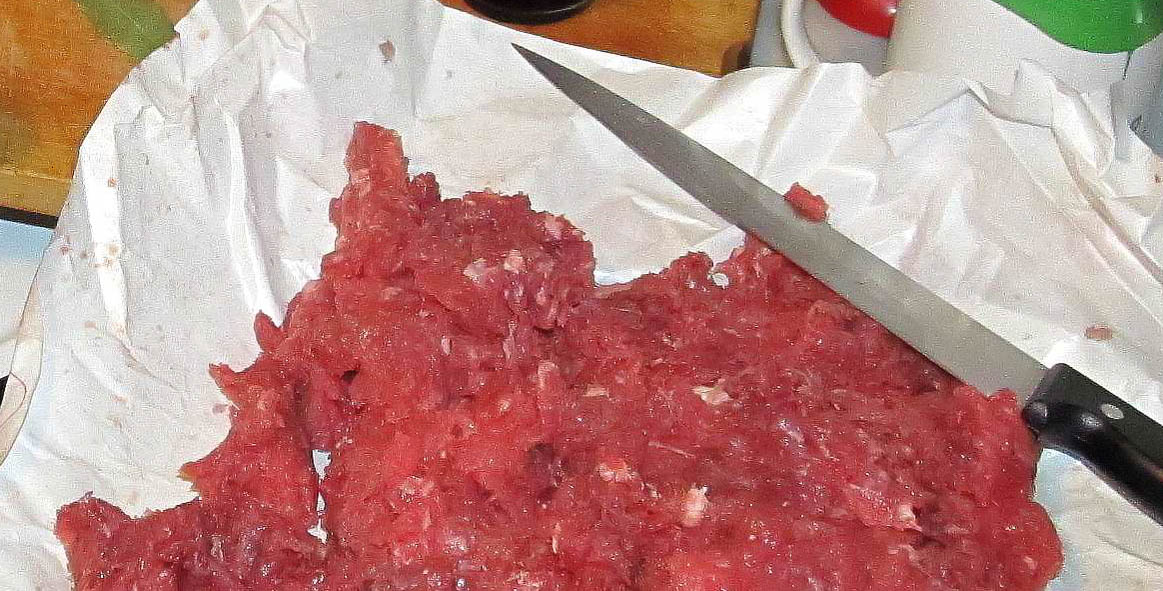
Donkey meat

Donkey meat is produced from the butchering of donkeys. It is traditionally consumed in China, Italy, and Latin America, both South America and Mexico.

== Production and consumption ==
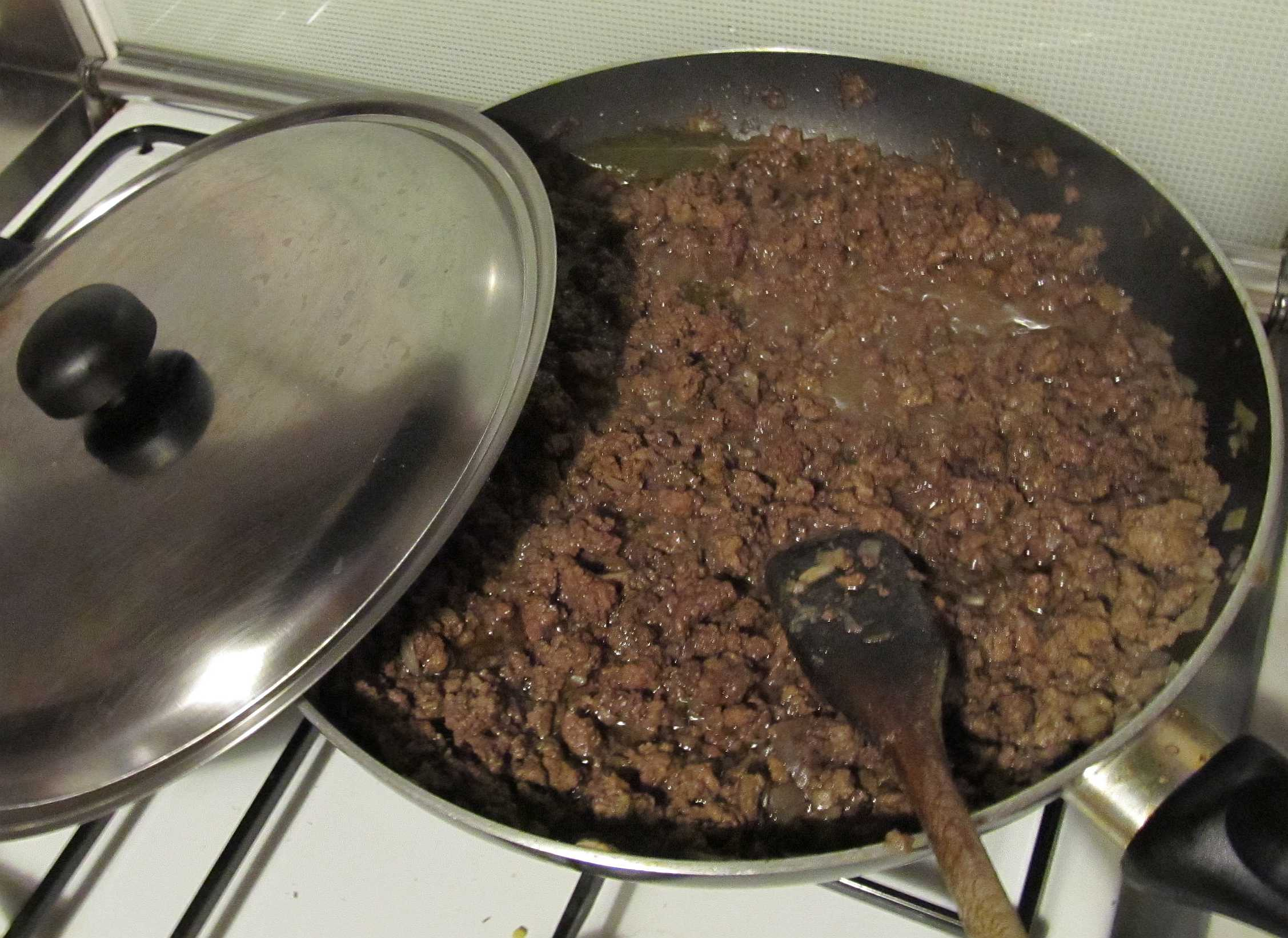
Tapulon is an Italian stew based on donkey meat

Donkey meat is considered to be of low quality, so donkeys are usually not raised specifically for meat production, except in arid regions where they represent an important food source. Since the donkeys are typically slaughtered at the end of their useful life as working animals, their meat is frequently tough.

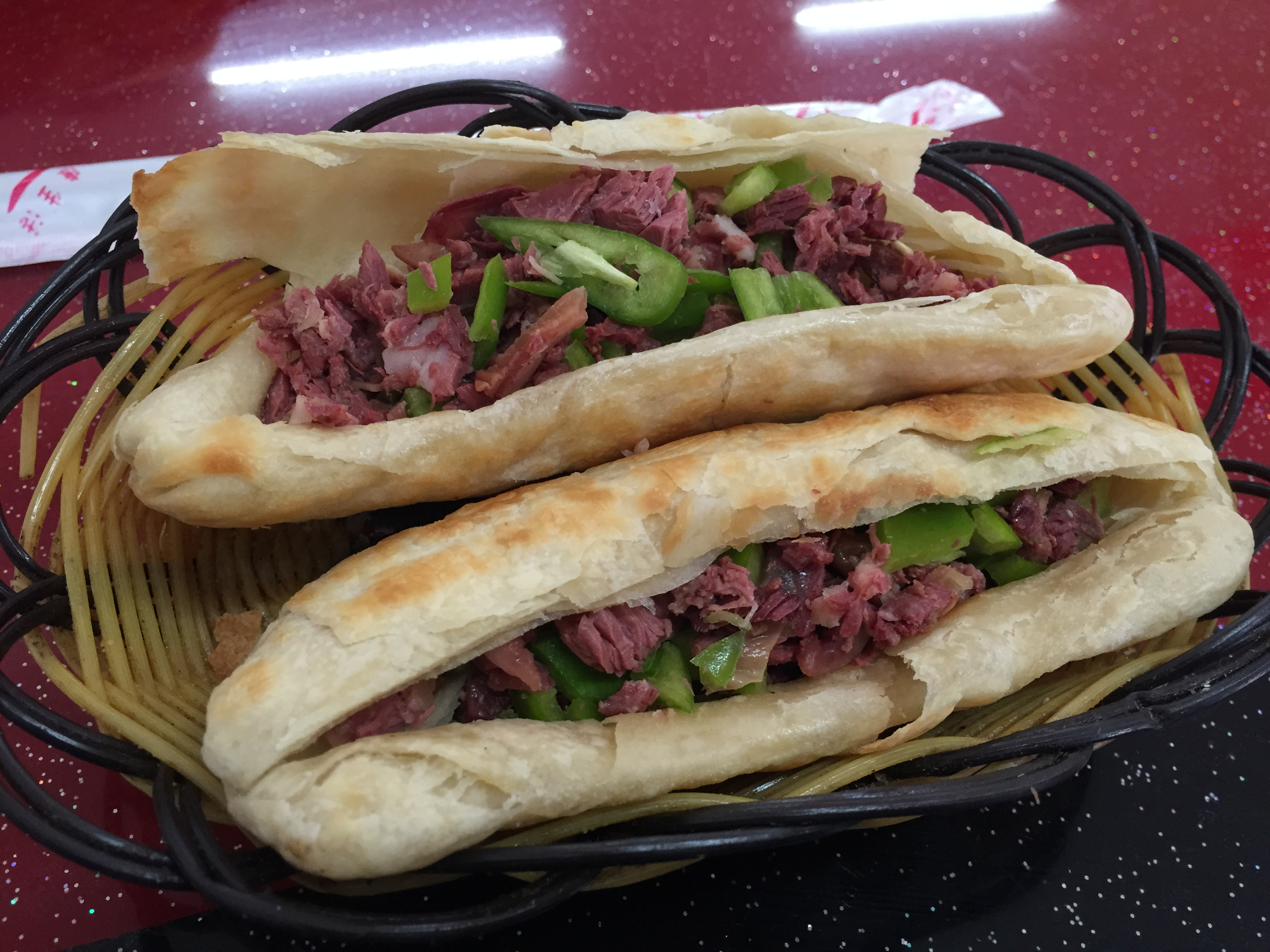
Donkey burgers from Hebei, China

The main global producers of donkey meat are China, Burkina Faso, Senegal, Nigeria, Mauritania, and Spain. Donkey meat has a smaller market compared to horse meat, and the main consumers are China (which is a significant importer), Italy, and Mexico. Approximately 3.5 million donkeys and mules are slaughtered each year for meat worldwide. In Italy, which has the highest consumption of equine meat in Europe and where donkey meat is the main ingredient of several regional dishes, about 1,000 donkeys were slaughtered in 2010, yielding approximately 100 tonnes (98 long tons; 110 short tons) of meat.

In West Africa, old donkeys are typically butchered at the end of their useful lifetime as pack animals, and their meat is traditionally dried and smoked. In France, donkey meat consumption has become rare after World War II, it is however still used as ingredient for traditional sausages in Provence. Hungary, Poland, and Russia have similar traditions. In the Anglosphere, donkey meat consumption, similarly to horse meat, is generally considered taboo.

Donkey meat can be consumed fresh, or used as ingredient for hams and sausages. Fresh donkey meat can be roasted or used as ingredient for stews. Donkey stew and tapulon are two examples of traditional stews in Italian cuisine. In China, the donkey burger is a traditional street food in Baoding and Hejian, Hebei Province. However, in recent years, the price of donkey meat has risen as China's donkey numbers have fallen sharply. Donkey sausage is traditionally prepared in Italy (salame d'asino), Provence (saucisson d'Arles), in Hungary (Eselwurst) and Poland (Salceson).

Despite the slaughter and consumption of donkeys being outlawed throughout India, donkey meat is still considered a delicacy in some regions of the state of Andhra Pradesh. Donkey meat’s popularity is fueled by superstitions that donkey meat will cure bodily pains and increase strength and virility while donkey blood will increase speed and pain tolerance.

Production of donkey meat

Production of donkey meat per animal

== Properties ==
Donkey meat is similar to horse meat and has a dark red colour, with yellowish fat.

A 100 g portion of donkey meat typically provides around 116 Kcal, with 3.1% fat and 20.7% protein.

== Religion ==
Judaism forbids donkey meat consumption, as they neither have cloven hooves nor do they chew their cud. Islam prohibits the consumption of domestic donkeys, but permits the meat of wild donkeys, such as onagers.

== Sources ==
- Polidori, Paolo; Di Girolami, Paola; Vincenzetti, Silvia (2021-07-28). "Vitamins and Minerals in Raw and Cooked Donkey Meat". Meat and Nutrition. IntechOpen. pp. 63−76. doi:10.5772/intechopen.96666. ISBN 978-1-83968-702-0.
