= Bing (bread) =

Chinese flatbread

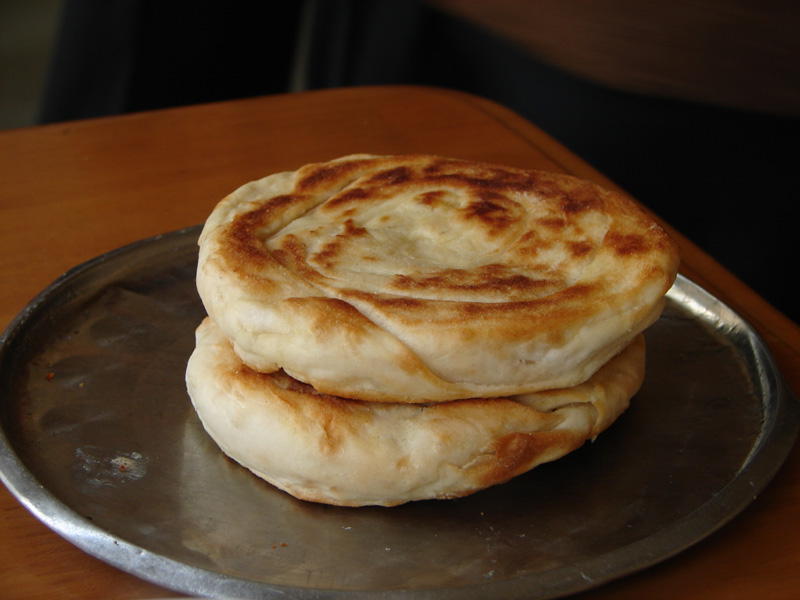
- Type: Flatbread or pancake
- Place of origin: China
- Main ingredients: Wheat flour

Chinese name
- Traditional Chinese: 餅
- Simplified Chinese: 饼
- Literal meaning: cake
Transcriptions
Standard Mandarin
- Hanyu Pinyin: bǐng
Yue: Cantonese
- Jyutping: beng2
Southern Min
- Hokkien POJ: piáⁿ

pancakes
- Traditional Chinese: 薄餅
- Simplified Chinese: 薄饼
- Literal meaning: thin cake
Transcriptions
Standard Mandarin
- Hanyu Pinyin: bó bǐng
Yue: Cantonese
- Jyutping: bok6 beng2

Bing (Chinese: 餠) is a wheat flour-based Chinese bread with a flattened or disk-like shape. These foods may resemble the flatbreads, pancakes, pies and unleavened dough foods of non-Chinese cuisines. Many are similar to a roti or crêpe; others are more similar to cakes and cookies.

The term is Chinese but may also refer to flatbreads or cakes of other cultures. The crêpe and the pizza, for instance, are referred to as keli bing (可麗餅) and pisa bing (披薩餅) respectively, based on the sound of their Latin names, and the flour tortilla is known as Mexican thin bing (墨西哥薄餅), based on its country of origin.

== Types ==
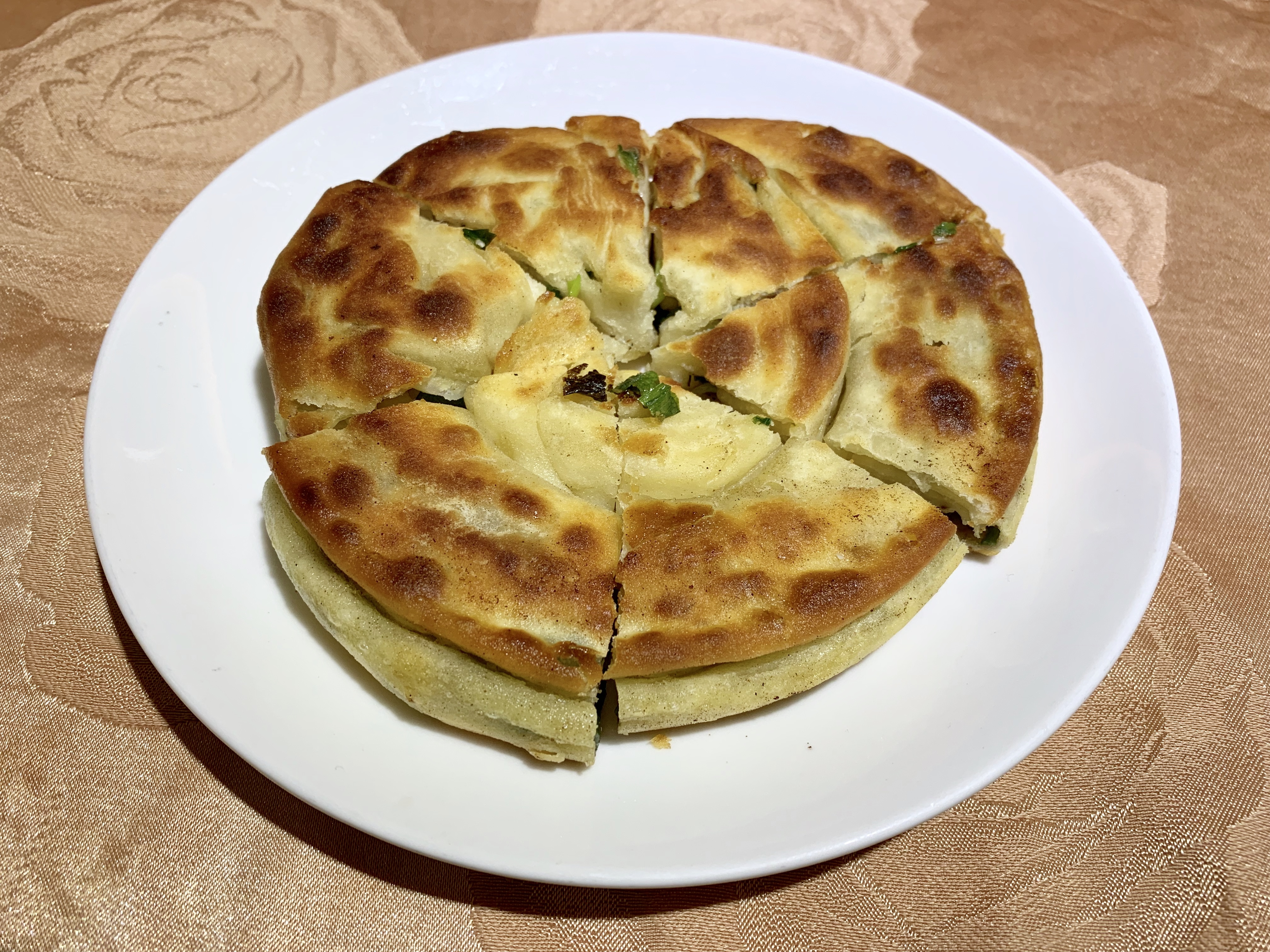
Cong you bing with scallions

Bing are usually a casual food and generally eaten for lunch, but they can also be incorporated into formal meals. Both Peking duck and moo shu pork are rolled up in thin wheat flour bo bing with scallions and sweet bean sauce or hoisin sauce. Bing may also have a filling such as ground meat. Bing are commonly cooked on a skillet or griddle although some are baked.

Some common types include:

- Cong you bing (蔥油餅; scallions and oil bing)
- Fa mian bing (發麵餅; yeast-risen bing)
- Laobing (烙餅; pan fried bing)
- Chun bing (春餅; spring pancake), a thin, Northern bing traditionally eaten to celebrate the beginning of spring. Usually eaten with a variety of fillings.
- Shaobing (燒餅; baked bing)
- Donkey burgers, a type of shaobing stuffed with meat
- Jianbing (煎餅; fried egg pancake, similar to crepes), a popular breakfast streetfood in China.
- Popiah (薄餅; literally "thin pancakes"), a thin circular crepe-like wrapper or "skin" (薄餅皮) wrapping various fillings. This is sometimes called "Mandarin pancake" or "moo shu pancake" (木須餅, mù xū bǐng) in American Chinese food contexts.

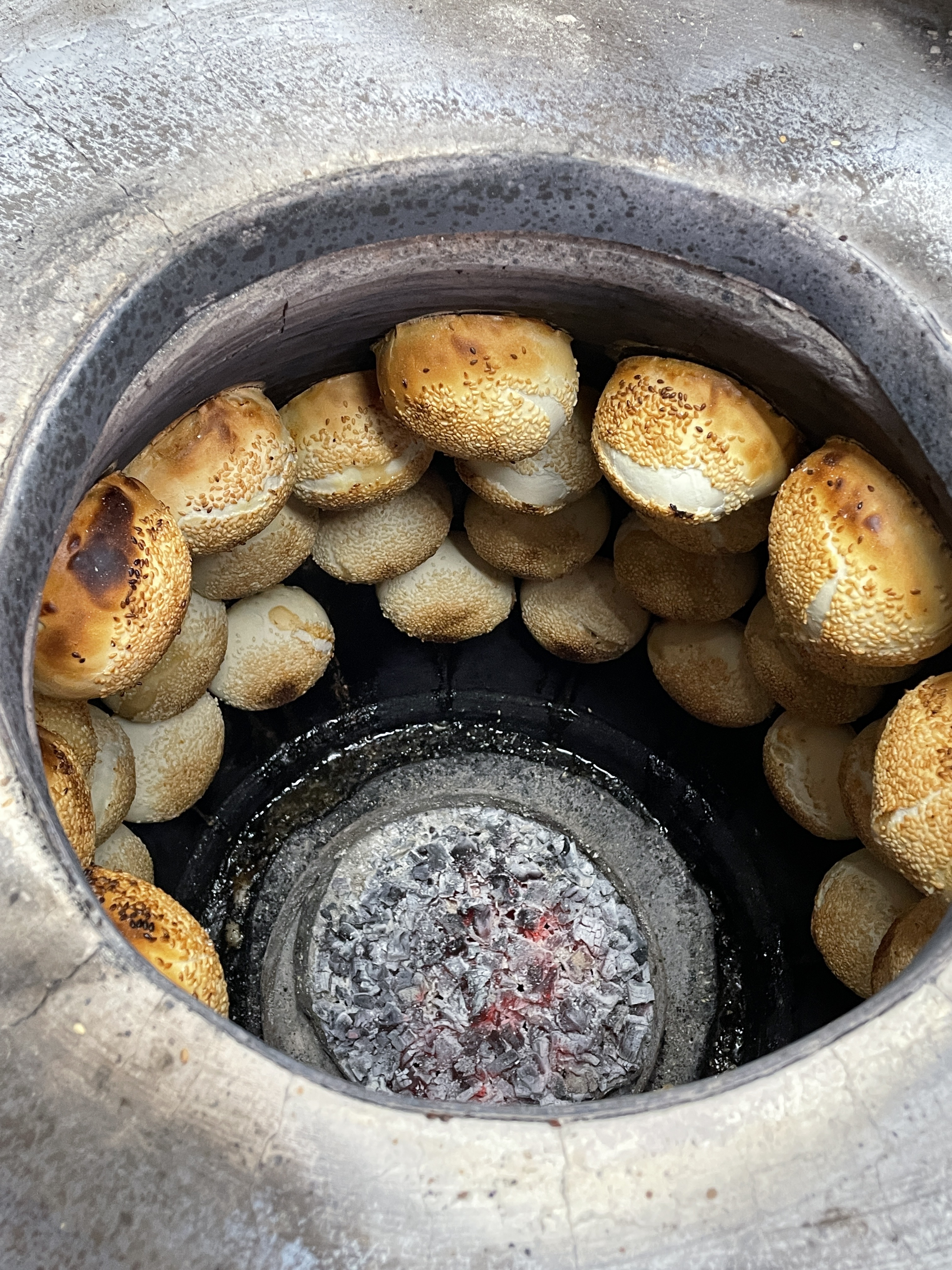
Hujiao bing being baked

- Luóbo si bing (蘿蔔絲餅, shredded radish bing), a type of panfried bing consisting of a wheat dough skin filled with shredded radish
- Rou jia bing (肉夾餅), also called rou jia mo refers to a bing that is sliced open and filled with meat, typically stewed pork or lamb meat. Some variants, such as niu rou jia bing (臘牛肉夾饃) use sesame bread and are filled with beef meat and pickled carrots and daikon, similar to a banh mi.
- Hé yè bǐng (荷葉餅; a foldable bing made to represent a lotus leaf), used to accompany many rich meat stuffings and popularized by the gua bao, a variation with red-cooked pork belly.
- Jin bing (筋餅) is a layered bing that is made with high-gluten flour (jin (筋) meaning gluten) popular in Northern China. It is also known as zhua bing (抓餅) since its layers can be grabbed (zhua (抓) meaning grab) at with hands.
- Guokui (鍋盔), from Shaanxi
- Hujiao bing (胡椒餅), made with black pepper

The Yuèbǐng (月餅; mooncakes) is really a baked sweet pastry usually produced and eaten at the mid-autumn festival. Some other dessert bings are "Wife" cake (老婆餅), which contains wintermelon, and the sweetened version of 1000 layer cake (千層餅) which contains tianmianjiang, sugar, and five spice or cinnamon.

Bings are also eaten in other East Asian cultures, the most common being the Korean Jeon (Korean: 전; Hanja: 煎) which often contain seafood.

In Japan, the character 餅 usually refers to mochi (glutinous rice cakes), but is also used for some other foods including senbei (煎餅) rice crackers, written with the same characters as but quite different from jianbing. Most Japanese bing-type cakes are instead called yaki (焼き), as in dorayaki, taiyaki, okonomiyaki, etc.

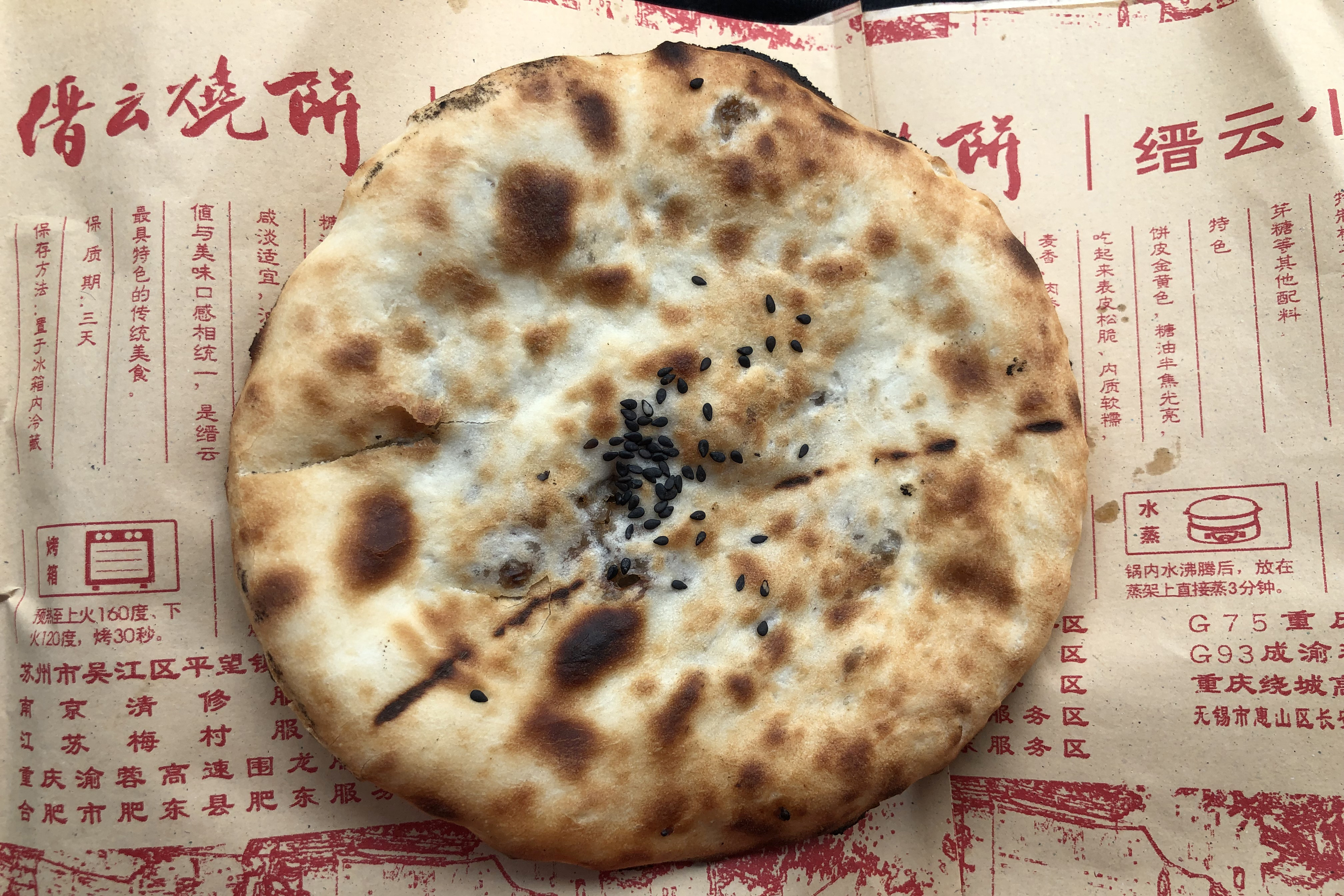
Jinyun-style shaobing (縉雲燒餅)

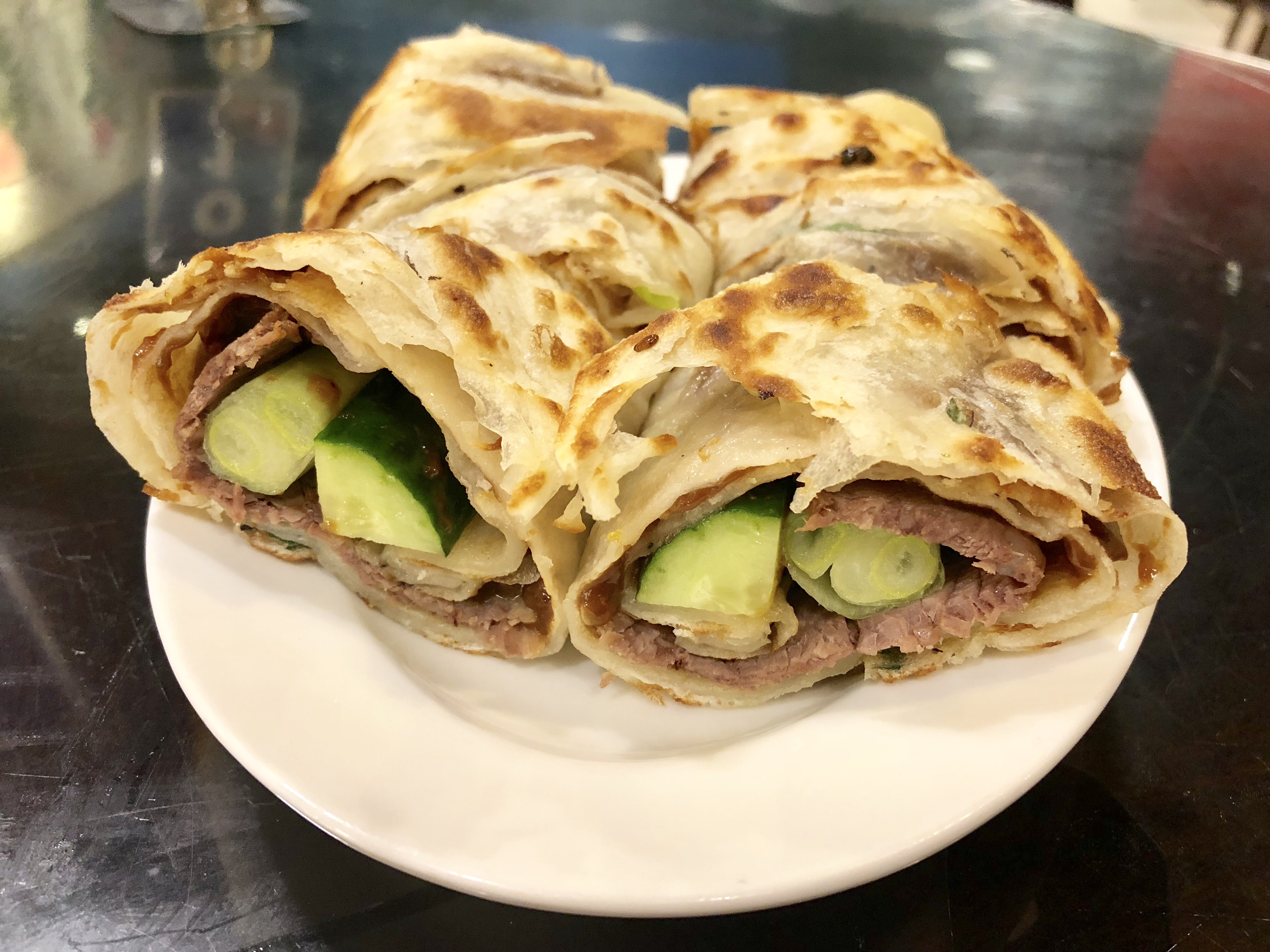
Wrapped bing

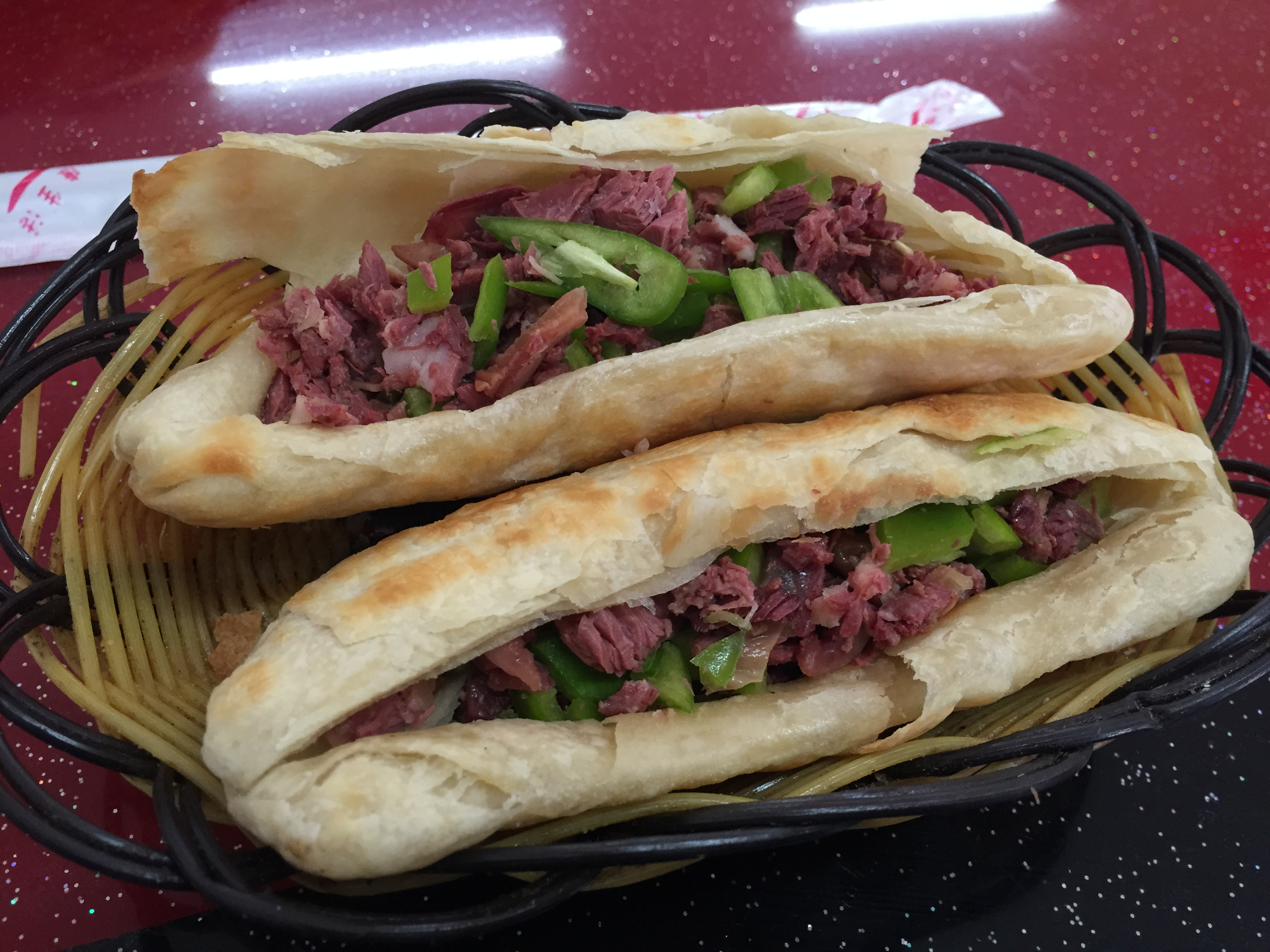
Donkey burgers

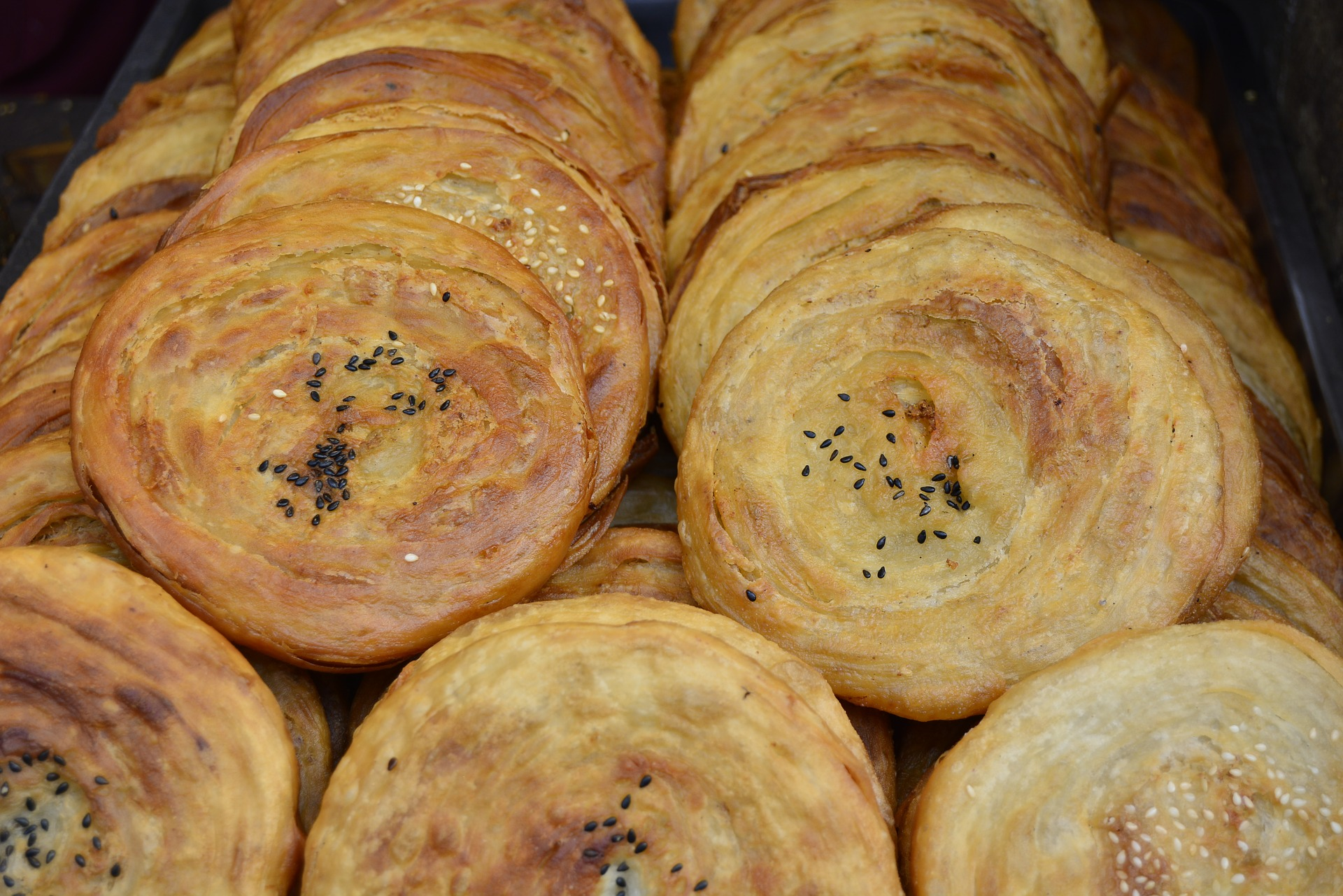
Guokui

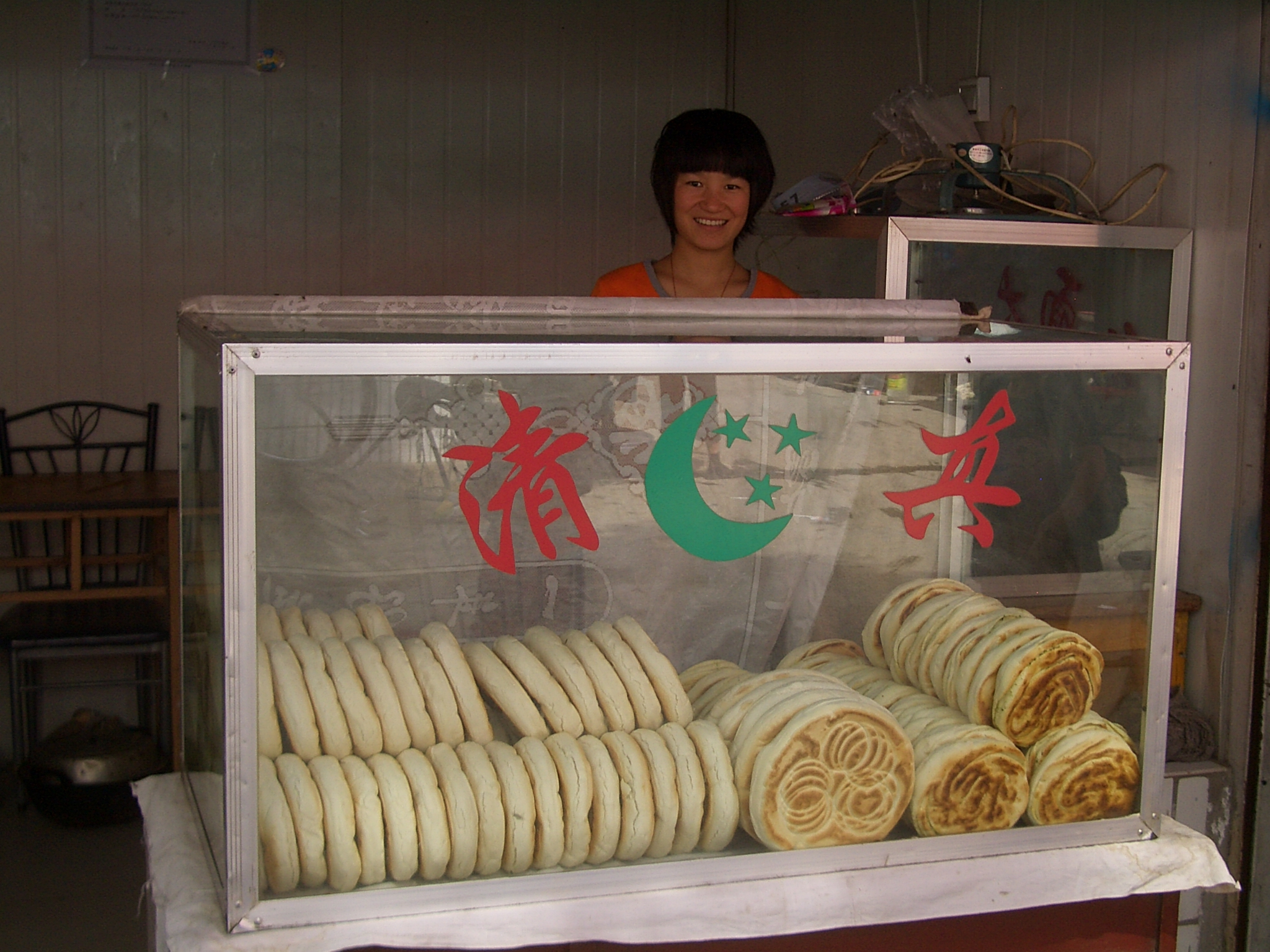
Dongxiang dabing in Lanzhou

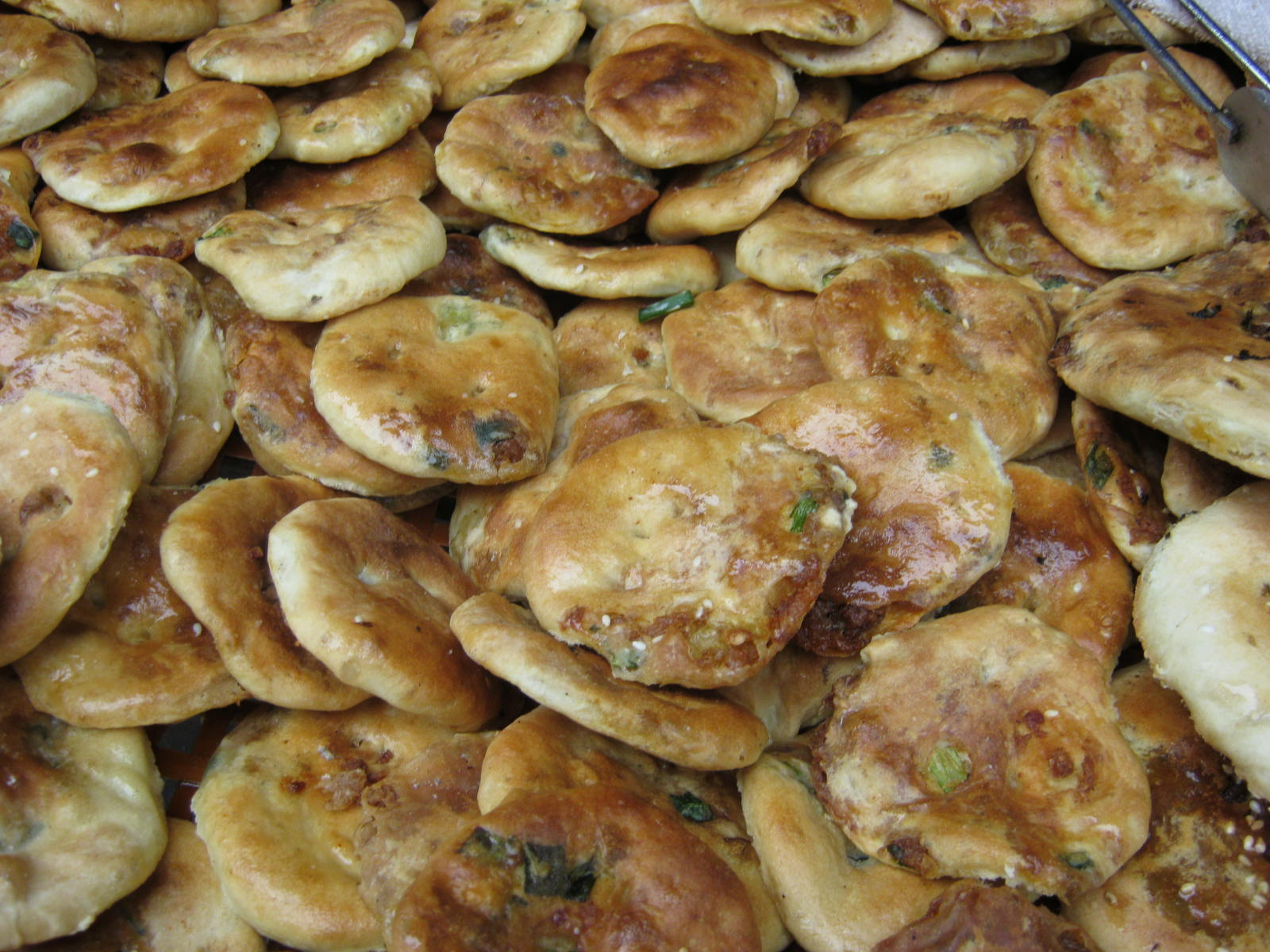
Guang bing in Fujian

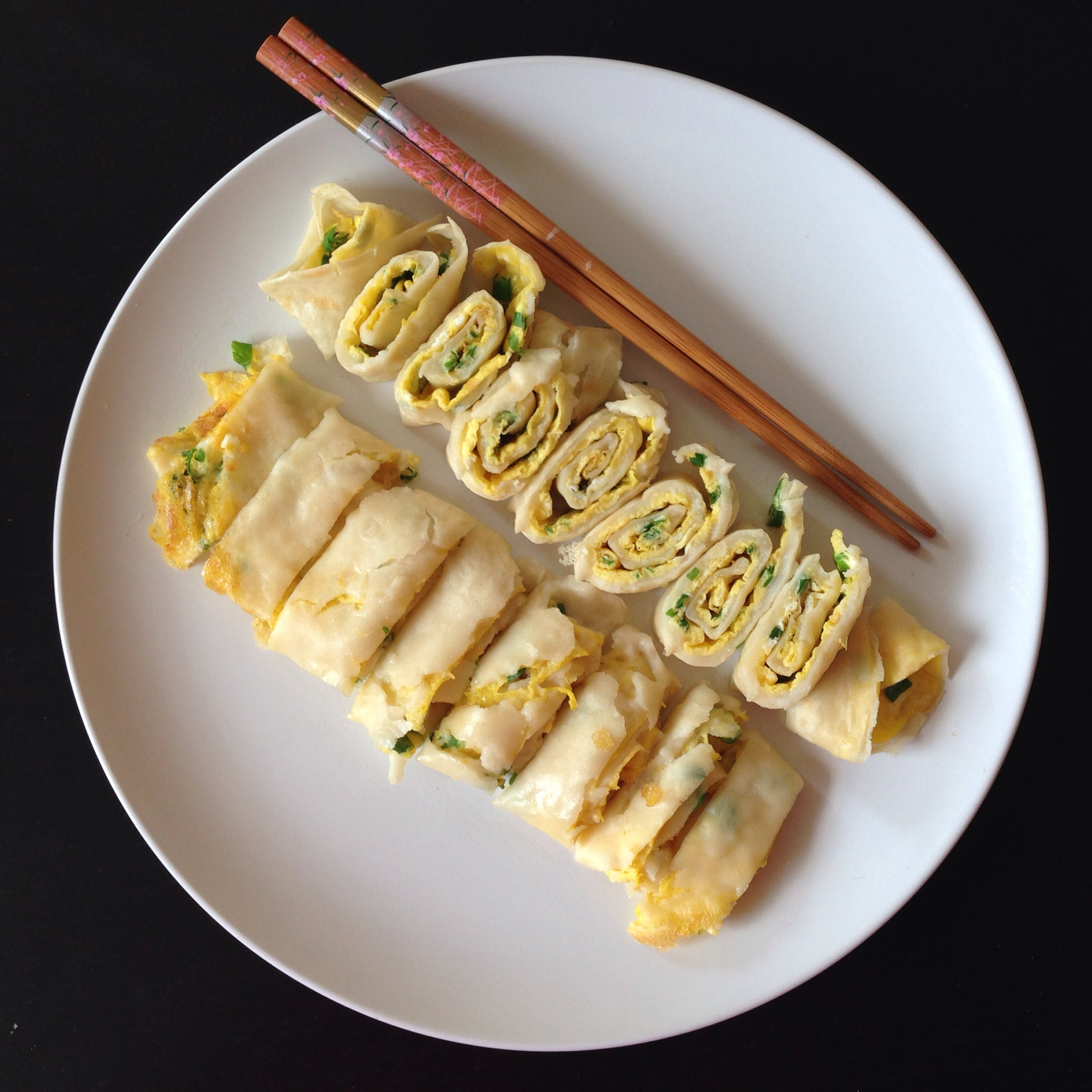
Taiwanese egg bing

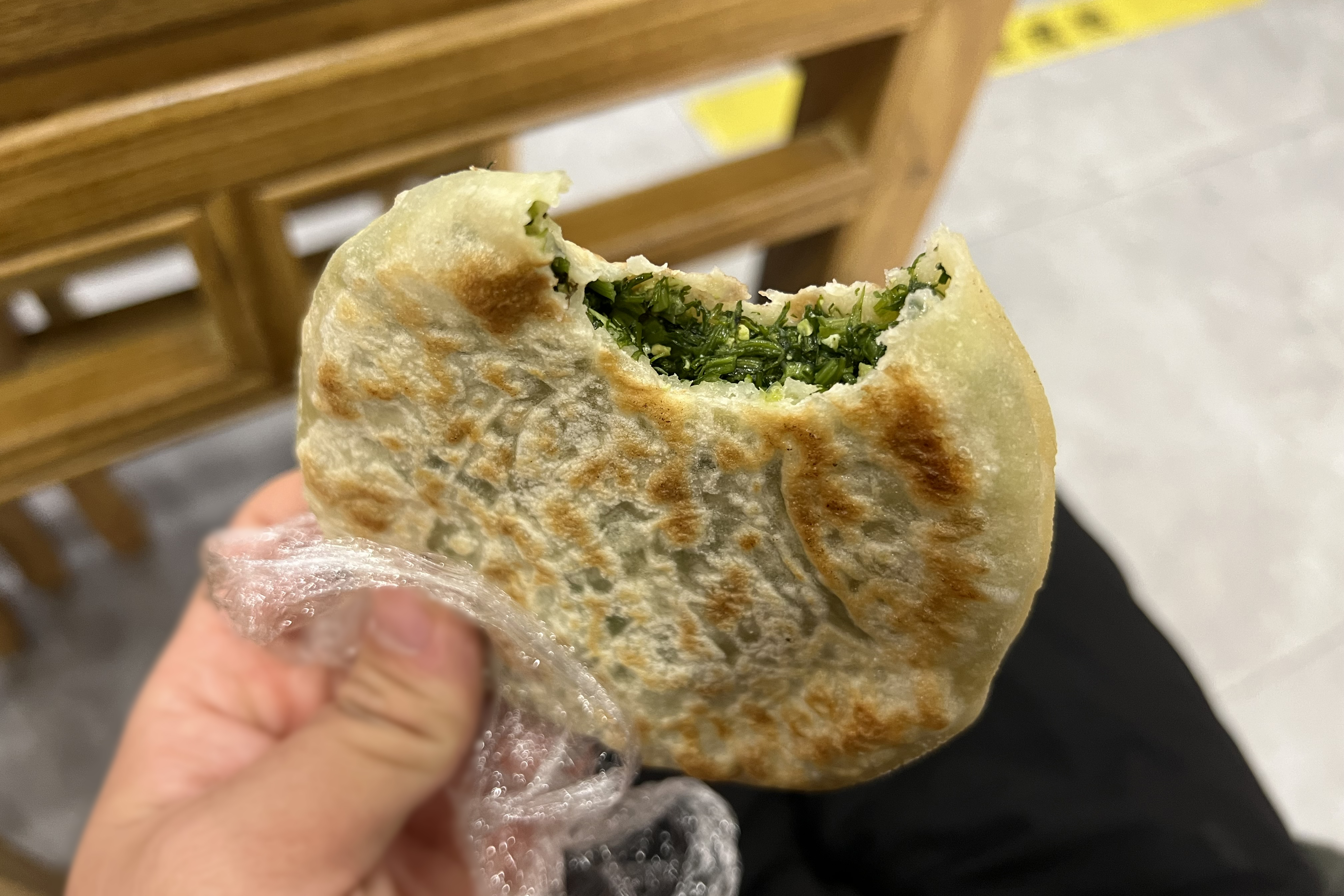
Fennel bing

== History ==
The earliest record of the word bing is in Mozi, written c. 400 BCE – c. 300 BCE, where it describes a food. In the Han dynasty, the dictionary Shuowen Jiezi (c. 100) defined bing as pastries made of wheat flour, while the dictionary Shiming (c. 200) defined bing as doughy foods including noodles, fried dough, and steamed or baked bread that food historians consider to be equivalent to pasta. During the Western Jin Dynasty (266–316), Shu Xi wrote about bing in more detail. He described various types of bing, some with origins in villages or foreign lands. He recommended stuffed buns for spring, what may be a flatbread for summer, what may be a leavened bread for autumn, and boiled noodles for winter. The first recipes for bing appeared in the sixth century agricultural text Qimin Yaoshu.

By the end of the Tang dynasty (618–907), when many more varieties of doughy foods were available, bing came to mainly refer to steamed or baked flatbreads while noodles became called mian. Wheaten foods including bing were a staple in northern China and also became popular in southern China.

== See also ==
- Bánh (bánh cuốn, bánh xèo, etc.)
- Jeon (food)
- Naan
- Okonomiyaki
- Paratha
- Qistibi
- Red tortoise cake
- Rice noodle roll
- Roti
- Roti canai
- Hotteok
- Kouign-amann
