= Donkey burger =

Sandwich eaten in Hebei, China

Lurou Huoshao
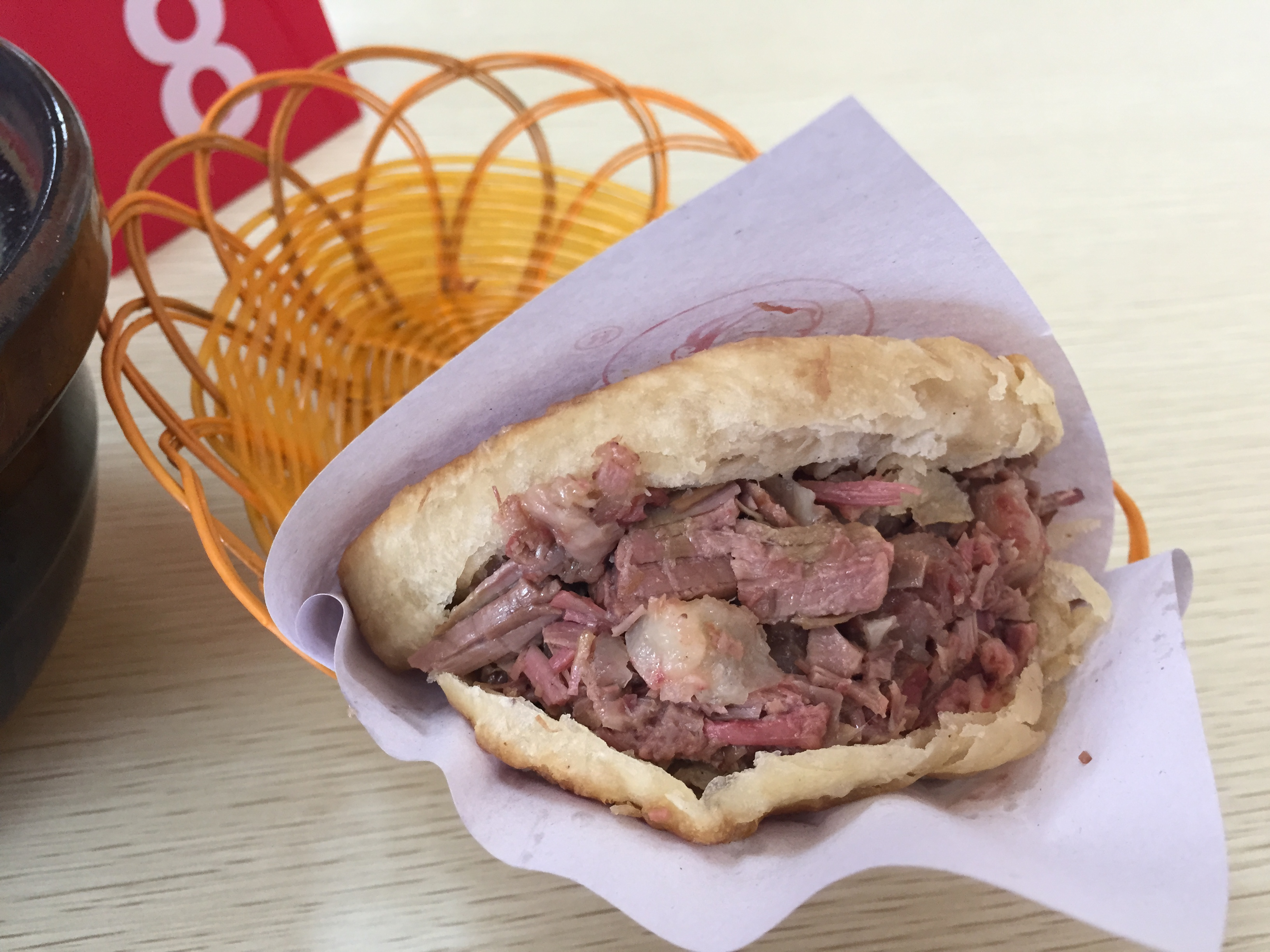
- Course: Snack, Side dish
- Place of origin: Baoding and Hejian, China
- Serving temperature: Hot
- Main ingredients: Donkey meat, bread

Donkey burger
- Traditional Chinese: 驢肉火燒
- Simplified Chinese: 驴肉火烧
- Hanyu Pinyin: lǘròu huǒshāo
Transcriptions
Standard Mandarin
- Hanyu Pinyin: lǘròu huǒshāo
- IPA: [ly̌.ɻòʊ.xwò.ʂáʊ]

Lürou Huoshao is a kind of sandwich commonly eaten in Baoding and Hejian, Hebei Province, China, where it is considered a local specialty, though it may also be found in other parts of China, particularly in Northeastern China. Chopped or shredded donkey meat or offal is placed within a huǒshāo or shao bing, a roasted, semi-flaky bread pocket, and eaten as a snack or as part of a meal. Hejian style typically serves the meat cold in a warm huoshao while Baoding style serves the meat hot; both often include green chili-pepper and coriander leaves. Lurou Huoshao is a popular street food and can also be found on the menus of high-end restaurants. In recent years, the price of donkey meat has risen as China's donkey numbers have fallen sharply.

A well-known saying, especially in Baoding (and elsewhere in Hebei province), is "In Heaven there is dragon meat, on Earth there is donkey meat" (天上龙肉，地上驴肉; 天上龍肉，地上驢肉; Tiānshàng lóngròu, dìshang lǘròu).

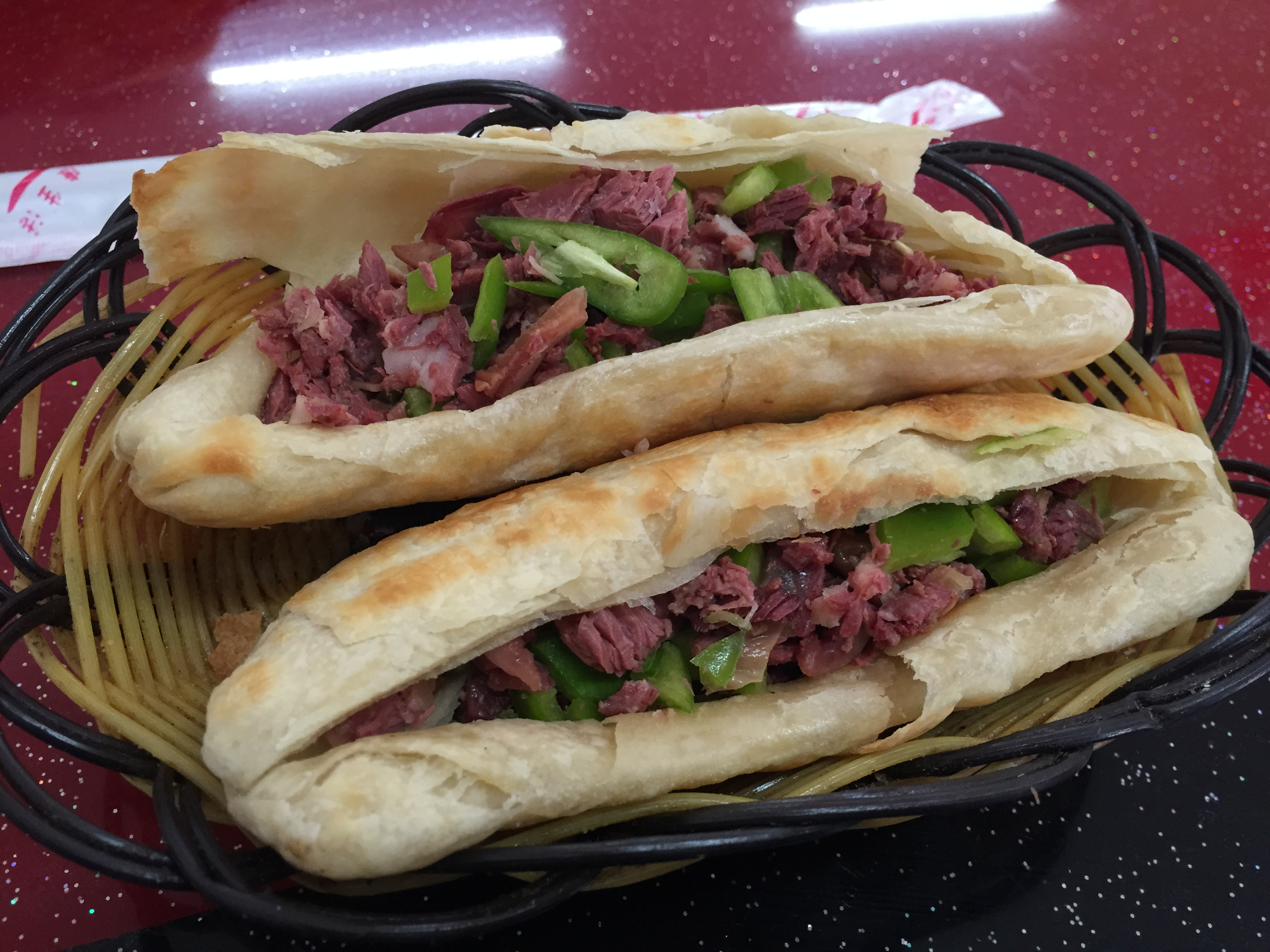
Hejian-style donkey burgers

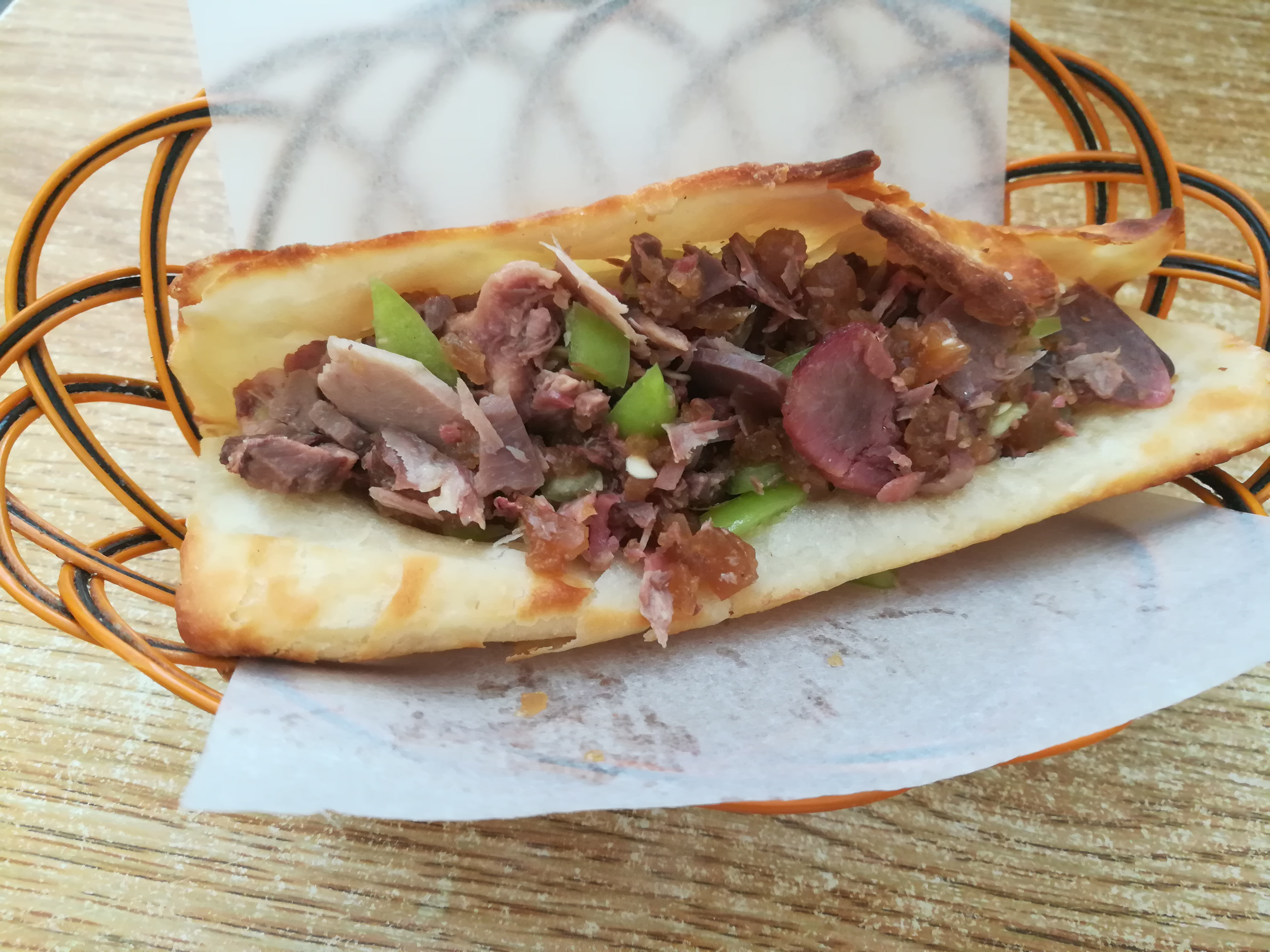

Lurou Huoshao has two styles: Baoding style and Hejian style. Baoding style uses round huoshao, while Hejian style uses rectangular huoshao. Also, Baoding style has hot meat, while Hejian style has cold meat.

Luorou Huoshao has been traced to the Ming Dynasty.

== See also ==
- List of sandwiches
- List of street foods
