= Shaobing =

Flatbread from Chinese cuisine

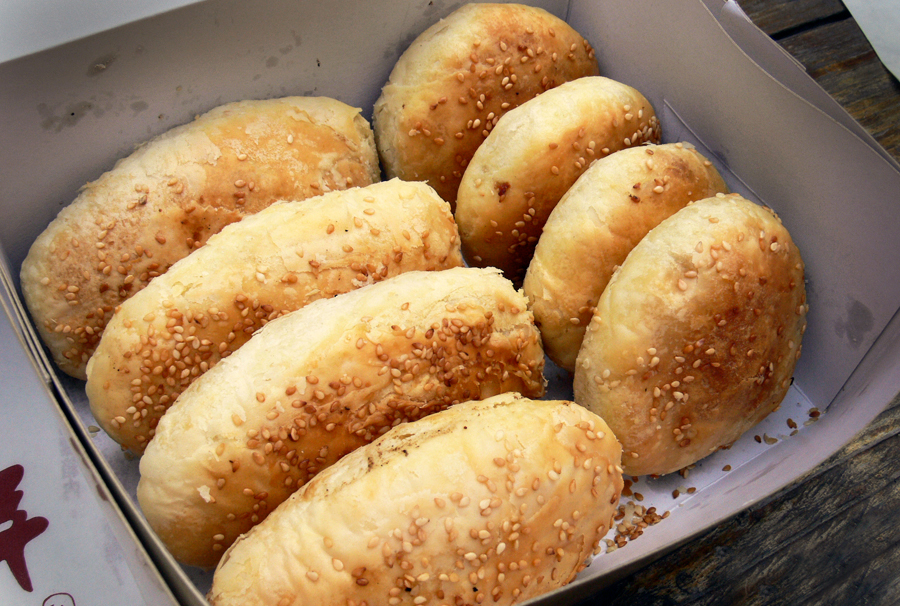
- Typical shaobing. The round shaobing on the right are sweet and filled with sugar and the long shaobing on the left are savory and salted.
- Alternative names: Huoshao
- Type: Flatbread
- Course: Breakfast
- Place of origin: China

Shaobing
- Traditional Chinese: 燒餅
- Simplified Chinese: 烧饼
- Literal meaning: roasted pastry
Transcriptions
Standard Mandarin
- Hanyu Pinyin: shāobǐng
- Wade–Giles: shao^{1}-ping^{3}
Yue: Cantonese
- Jyutping: siu1 beng2
Southern Min
- Hokkien POJ: sio-piáⁿ

Huoshao
- Traditional Chinese: 火燒
- Simplified Chinese: 火烧
- Literal meaning: fire roasted
Transcriptions
Standard Mandarin
- Hanyu Pinyin: huǒshāo
- Wade–Giles: huo^{3}-shao^{1}
Yue: Cantonese
- Jyutping: fo2 siu1
Southern Min
- Hokkien POJ: hóe-sio/hé-sio

Shaobing (pinyin: shāobǐng; Wade–Giles: shao-ping), also called huoshao, is a type of baked, unleavened, layered flatbread in northern Chinese cuisine. Shaobing can be made with or without stuffing, and with or without sesame on top. Shaobing contains a variety of stuffings that can be grouped into two main flavors: savory or sweet. Some common stuffings include red bean paste, black sesame paste, stir-fried mung beans with egg and tofu, braised beef, smoked meat, or beef or pork with spices.

Shaobing is not very well known in southern China, unlike other northern dishes like mantou, baozi, and youtiao. Most Shaobing are popular in the northern part of China. Different types of shaobing are often associated with certain cities and towns.

Shaobing is a common breakfast item. Filled shaobing are usually eaten with soy milk and tea, while unfilled ones are usually eaten with steamed eggs or a breakfast meat dish. In the Mandarin cuisine tradition, shaobing are served with hot pot (huǒguō) in winter or soy milk.

== History ==
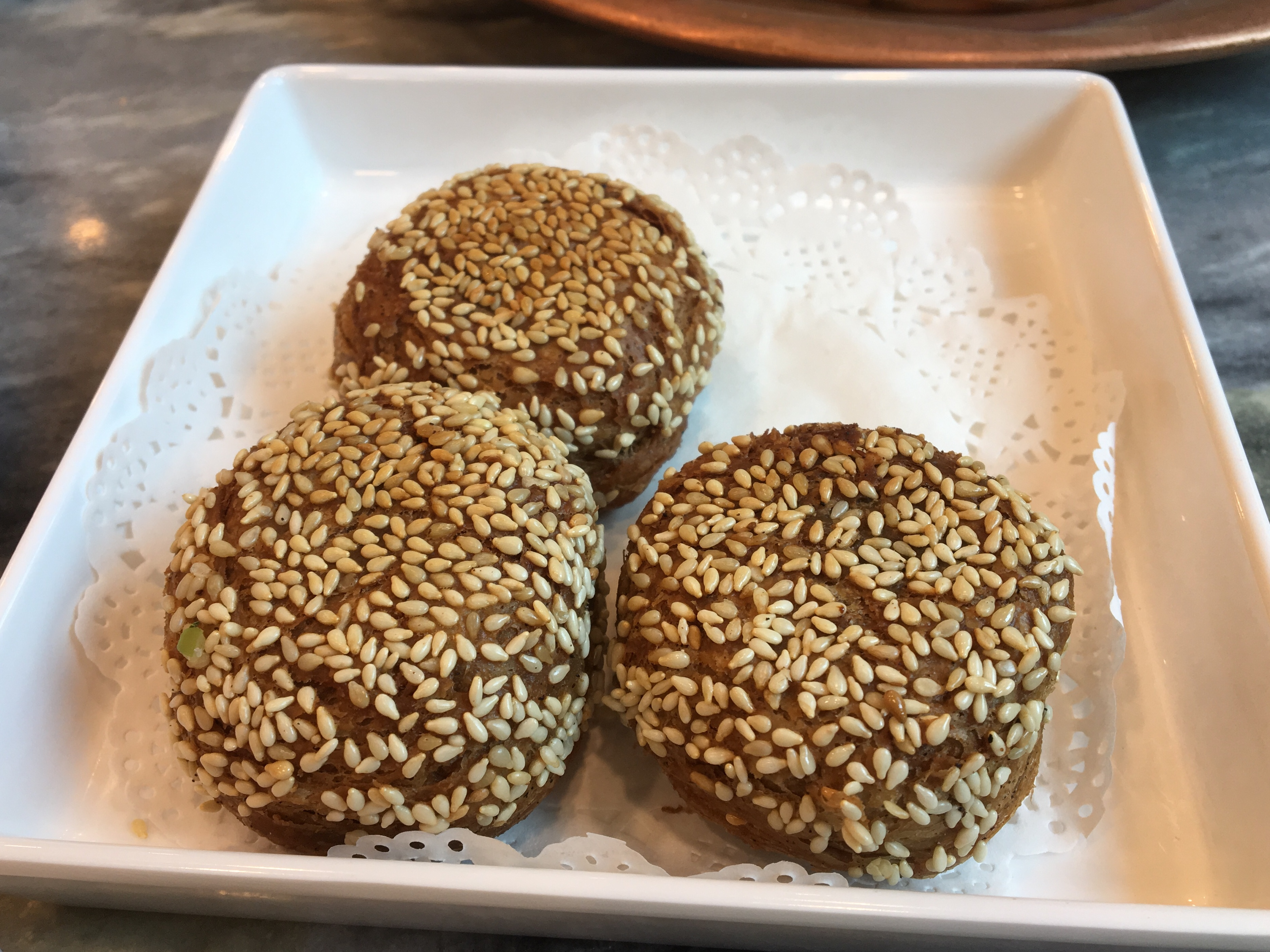
Sesame shaobing

Chinese legends claim that the roasted, flat shaobing was brought back from the Xiyu (the Western Regions, a name for far-western China and Central Asia) by the Han dynasty General Ban Chao, and that it was originally known as hubing (胡餅, lit. 'barbarian pastry'). The shaobing is believed to be descended from the hubing. Shaobing is believed to be related to the Persian and Central Asian naan and the Near Eastern pita. Foreign westerners made and sold sesame cakes in China during the Tang dynasty.

== Types ==
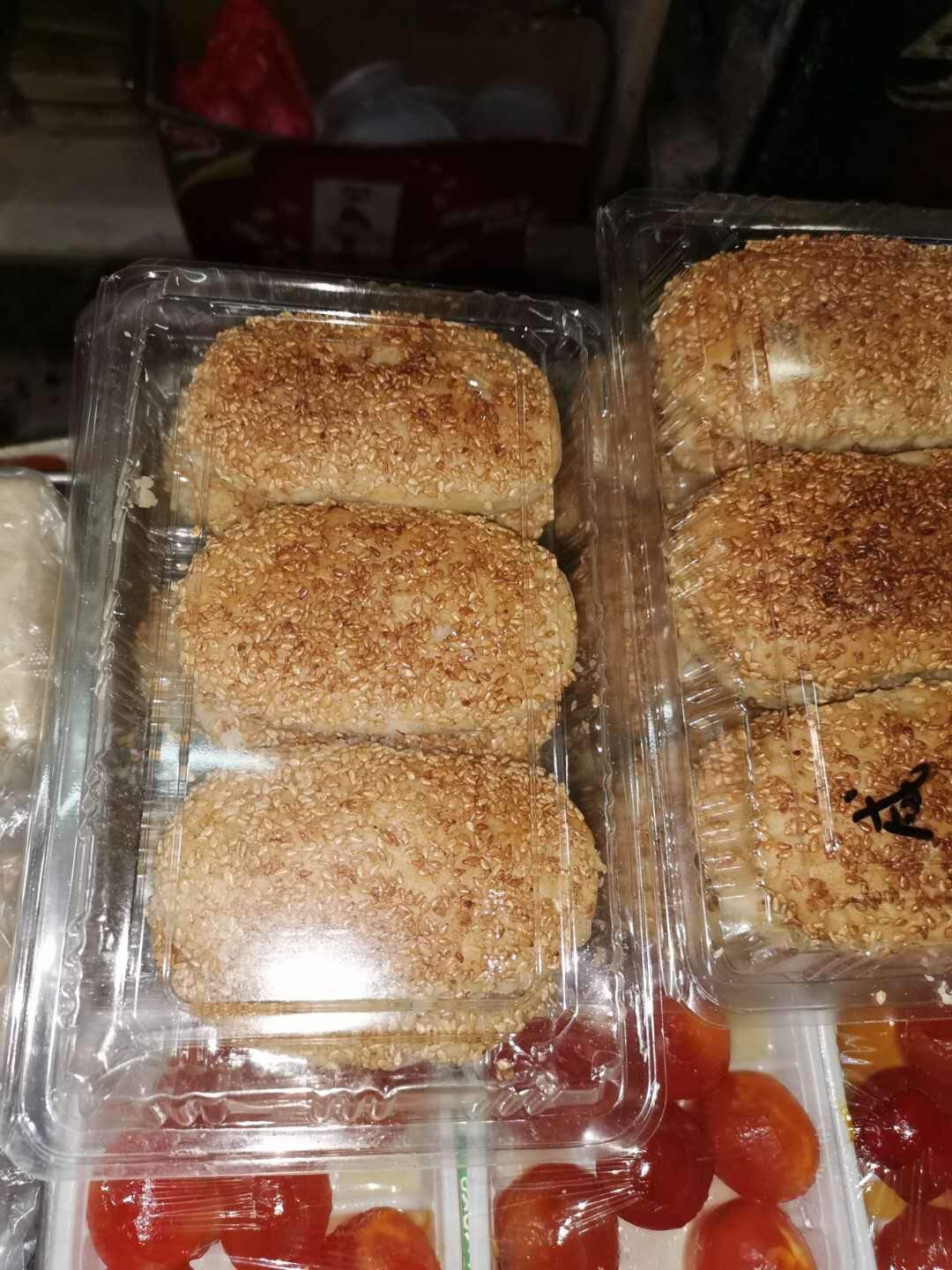
Magao, or Changzhou sesame cake

=== Huangqiao Shaobing ===
Huangqiao Shaobing (黄桥烧饼; Huángqiáo Shāobǐng) is one kind of Shaobing. It is made of flour, oil, sesame and other raw materials. It is golden in color and crispy on the outside. Traditionally, it is divided into sweet taste and salty taste. Generally, the sweet taste one is round and the salty taste one is long and oval.

=== Zhoucun Shaobing ===
Zhoucun Shaobing (周村烧饼), is a kind of Shaobing. It is a traditional snack in Zibo, Shandong province, China, created by Guo Yunlong based on a horseshoe-shaped thick pancake. Its shape is round and thin as paper. The front is covered with sesame seed, the back is full of crisp holes. It is famous because of its special crisp and ability to conserve for a long time.

=== Magao ===
Magao (常州大麻糕; Chángzhōu Dàmágāo), or sesame cake, is popular in the city of Changzhou in Jiangsu province. Changzhou sesame cakes are flat and oval-shaped. The traditional flavors are sweet, salty and spicy. It has golden thin crisp skin. To make Changzhou sesame cake, the chef needs to select the finest pigs suet, white flour, hulled sesame seeds, white sugar, refined salt, etc. other refined raw materials; then bake in a traditional barrel furnace.

=== Donkey burger ===
Donkey burgers, or donkey sandwiches, are a type of shaobing that is cut open and filled with meat, and are mostly eaten in Hebei province.

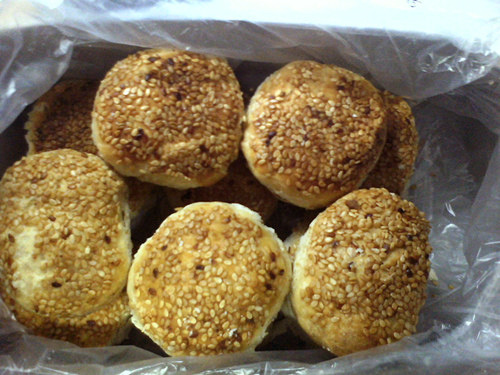
Huangqiao shaobing

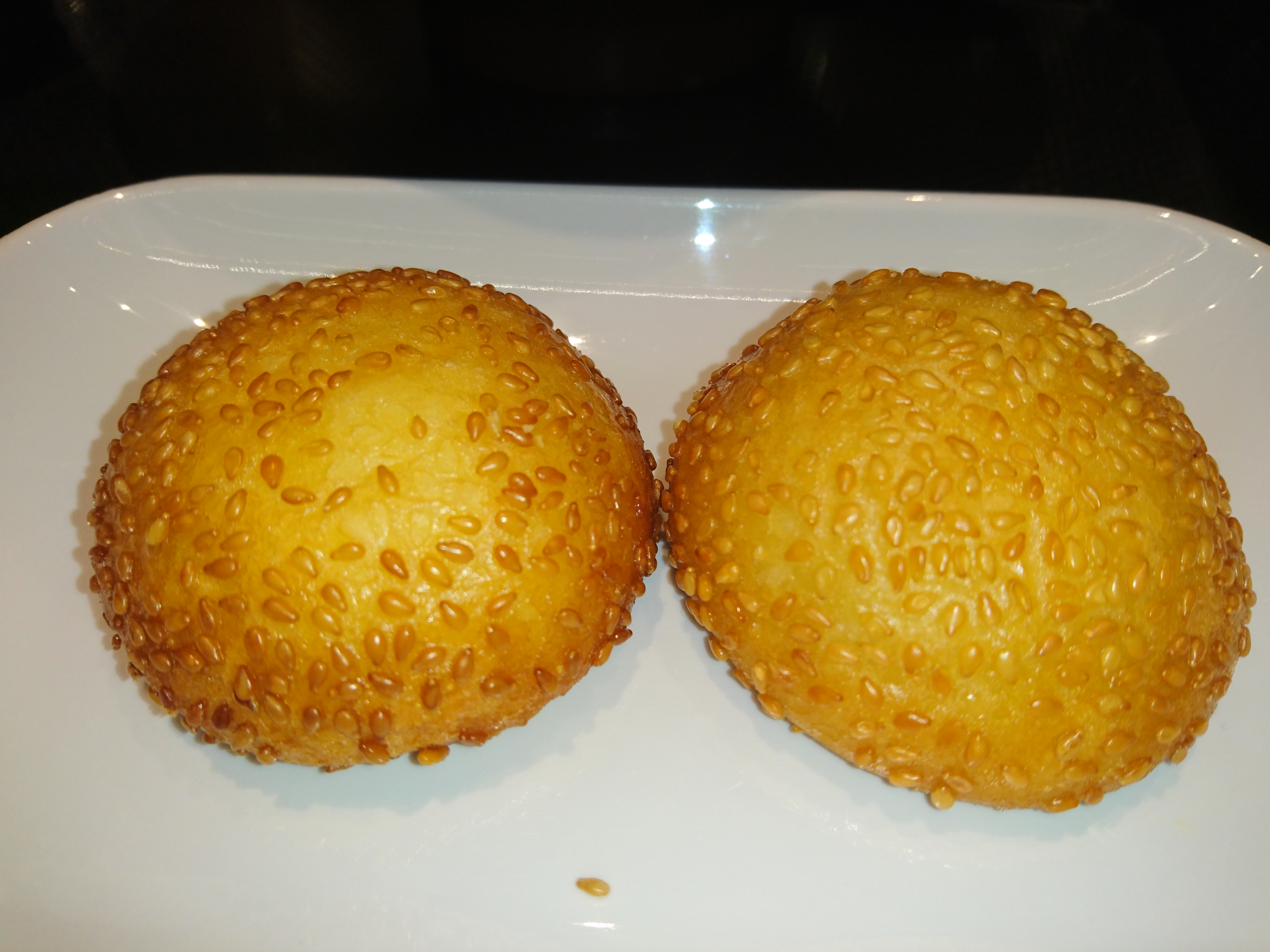
Shaobing with red bean paste

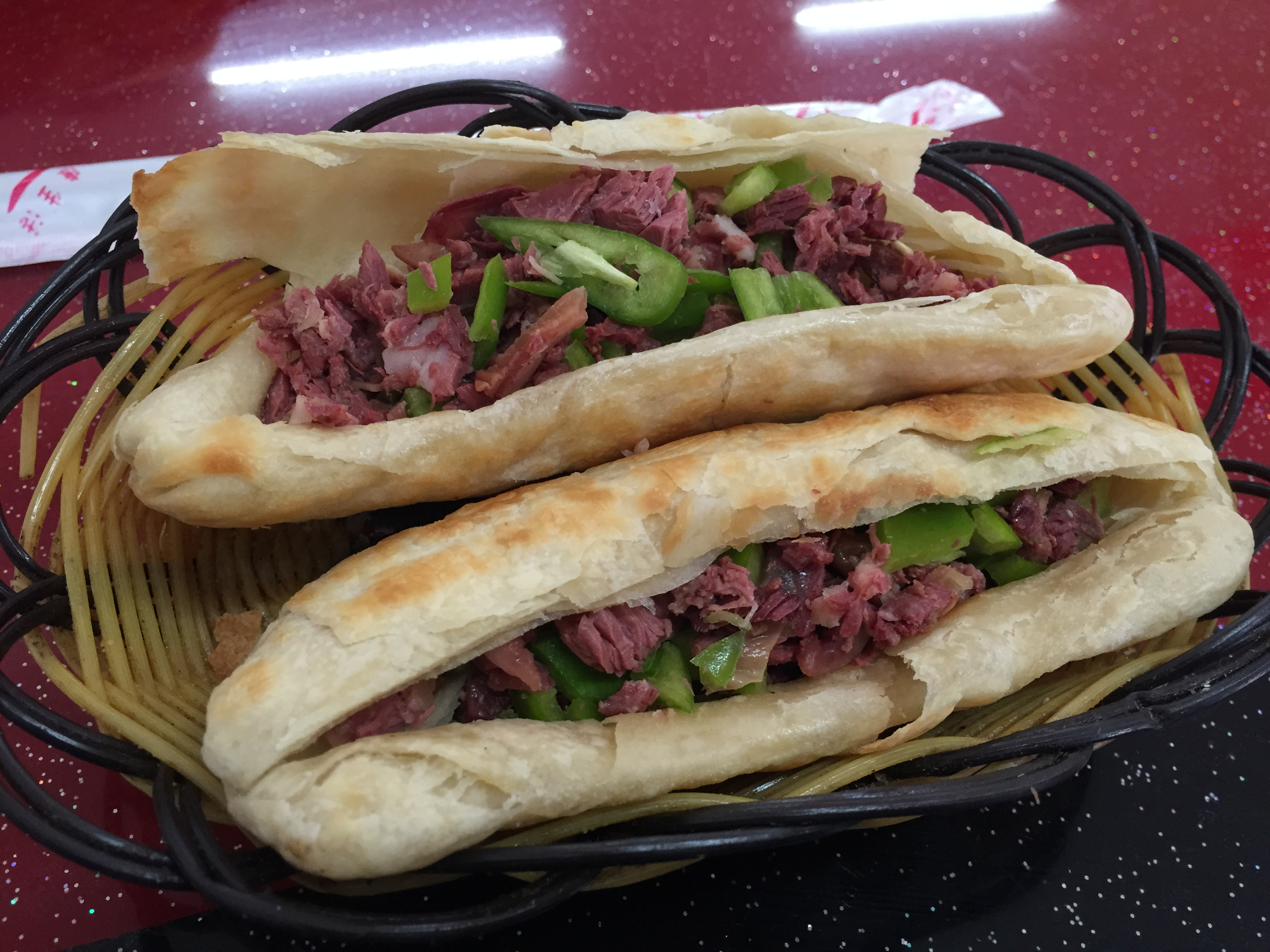
Donkey burger

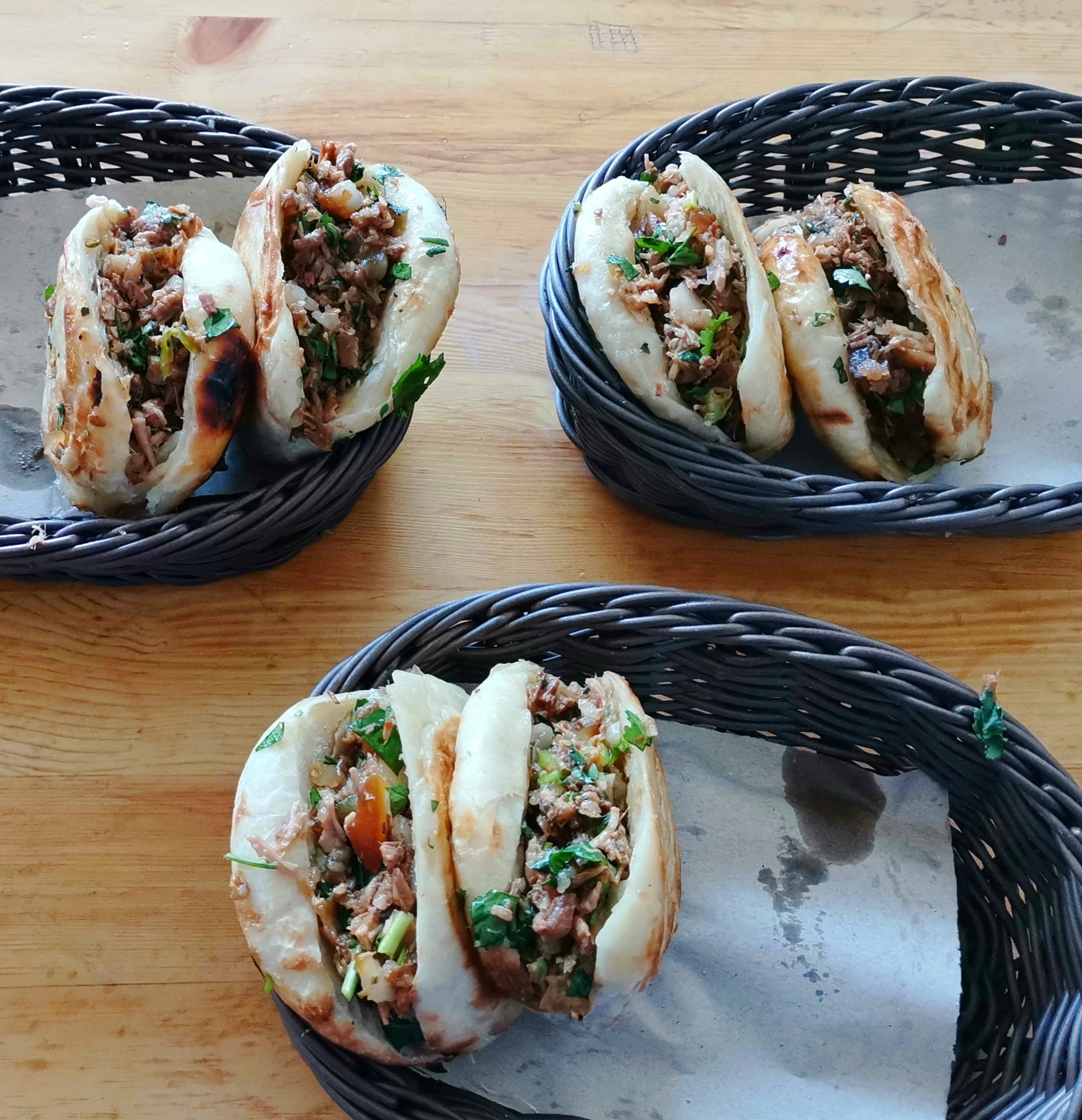
Shaobing with pork

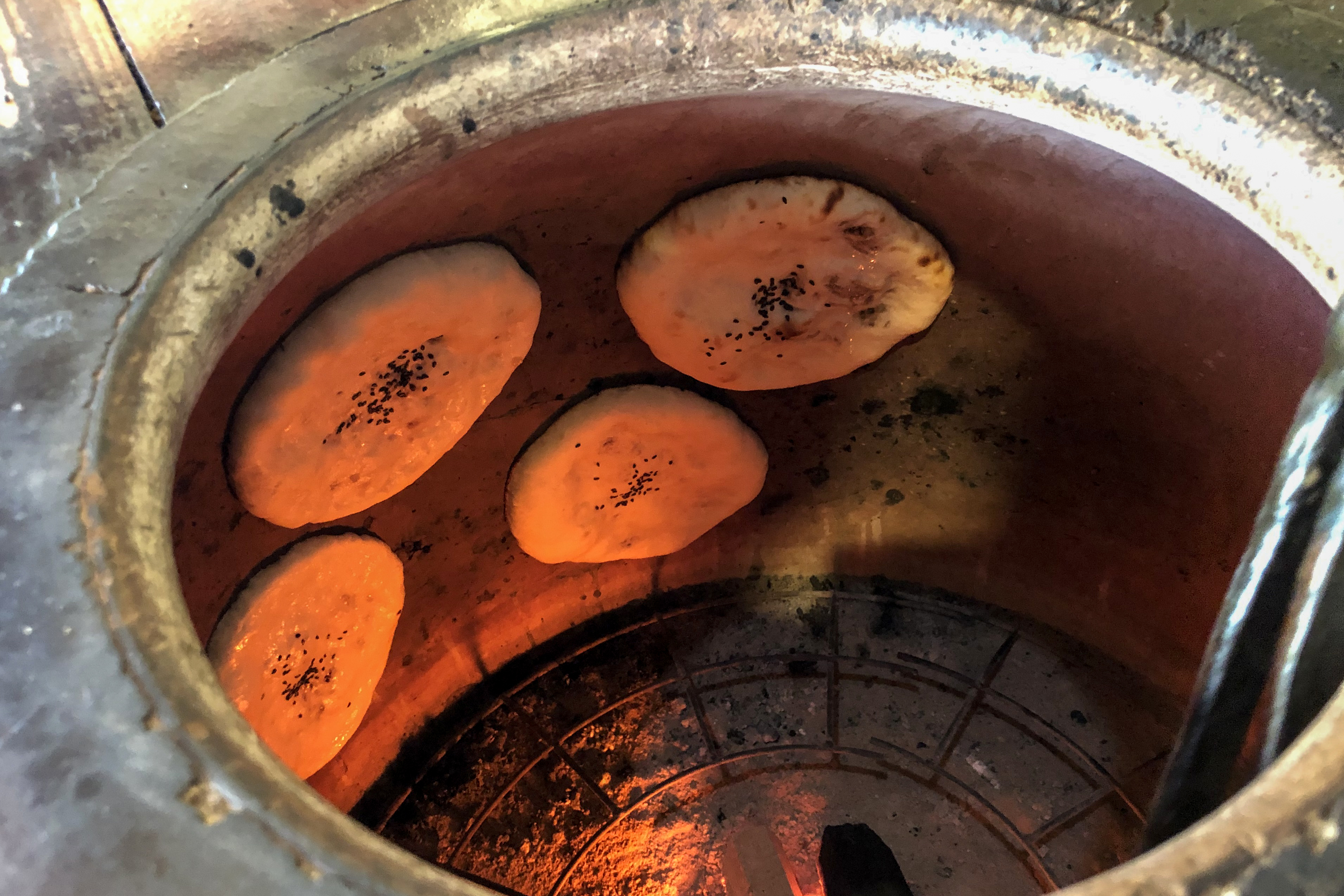
Baking in clay oven

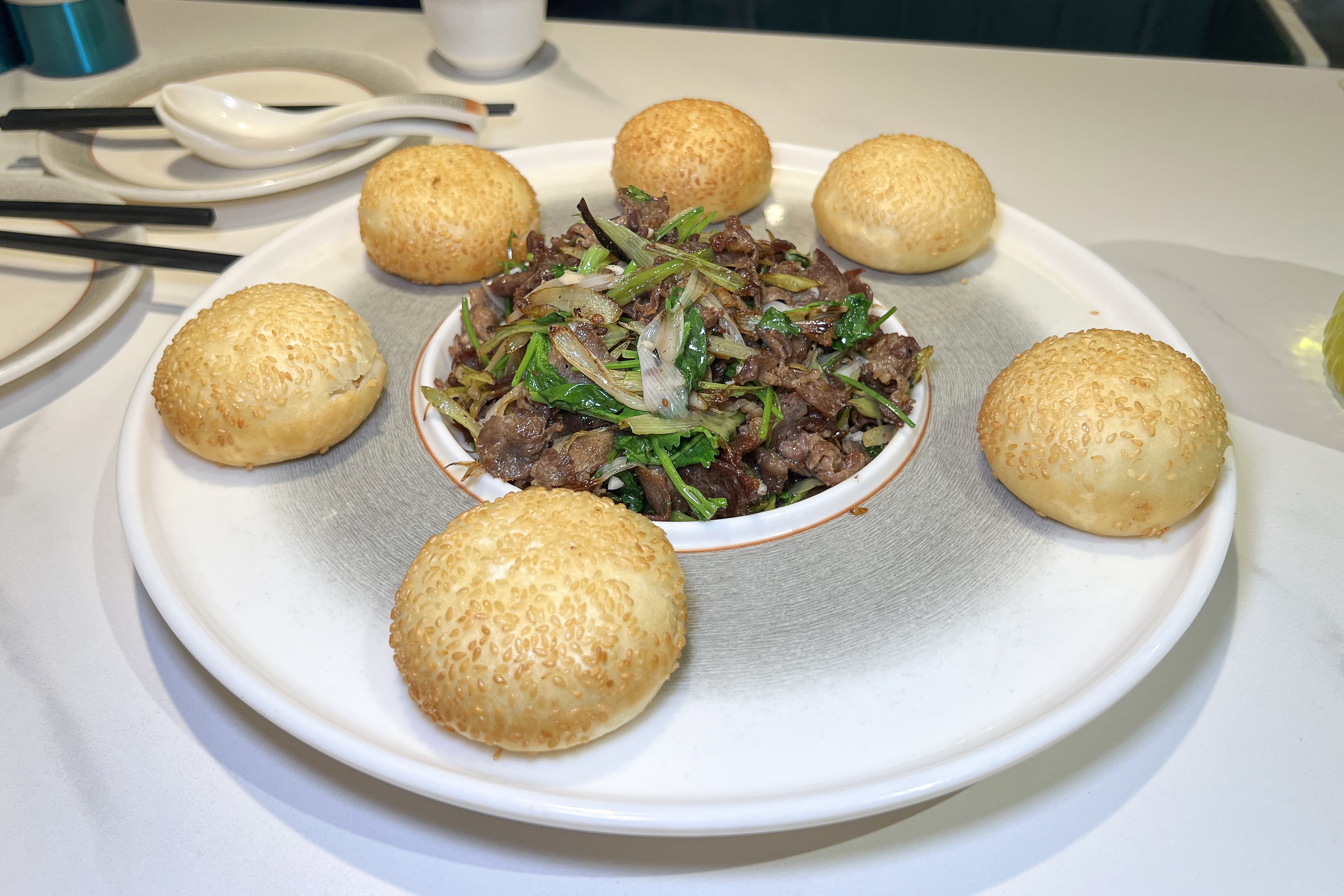
Baohu, or shaobing stuffed with mutton

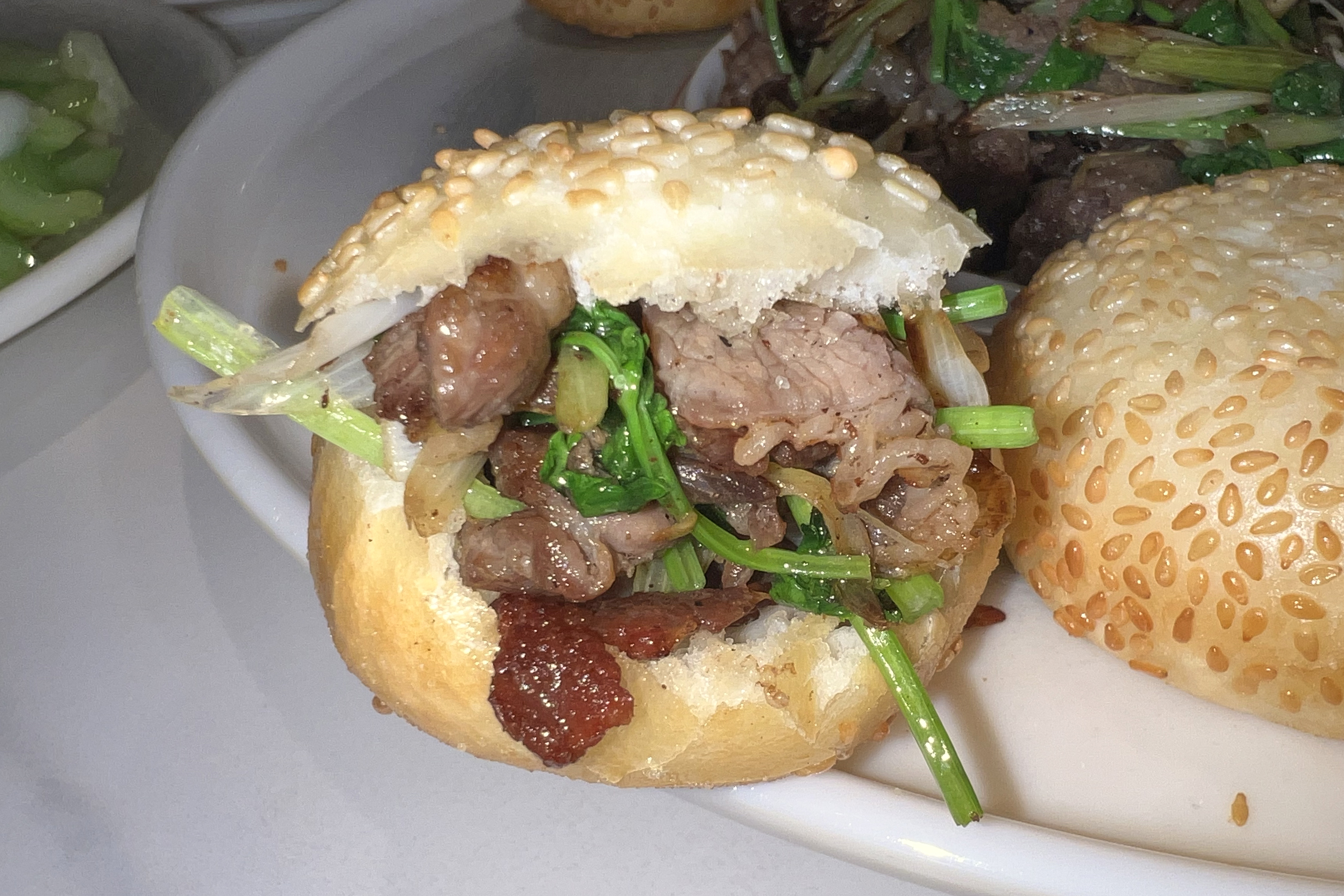
Baohu

== See also ==
- List of Chinese dishes
- Shaobing Song
- Khuushuur, a Mongolian variant of huoshao
- Pogača
