= Jianbing =

Chinese street food

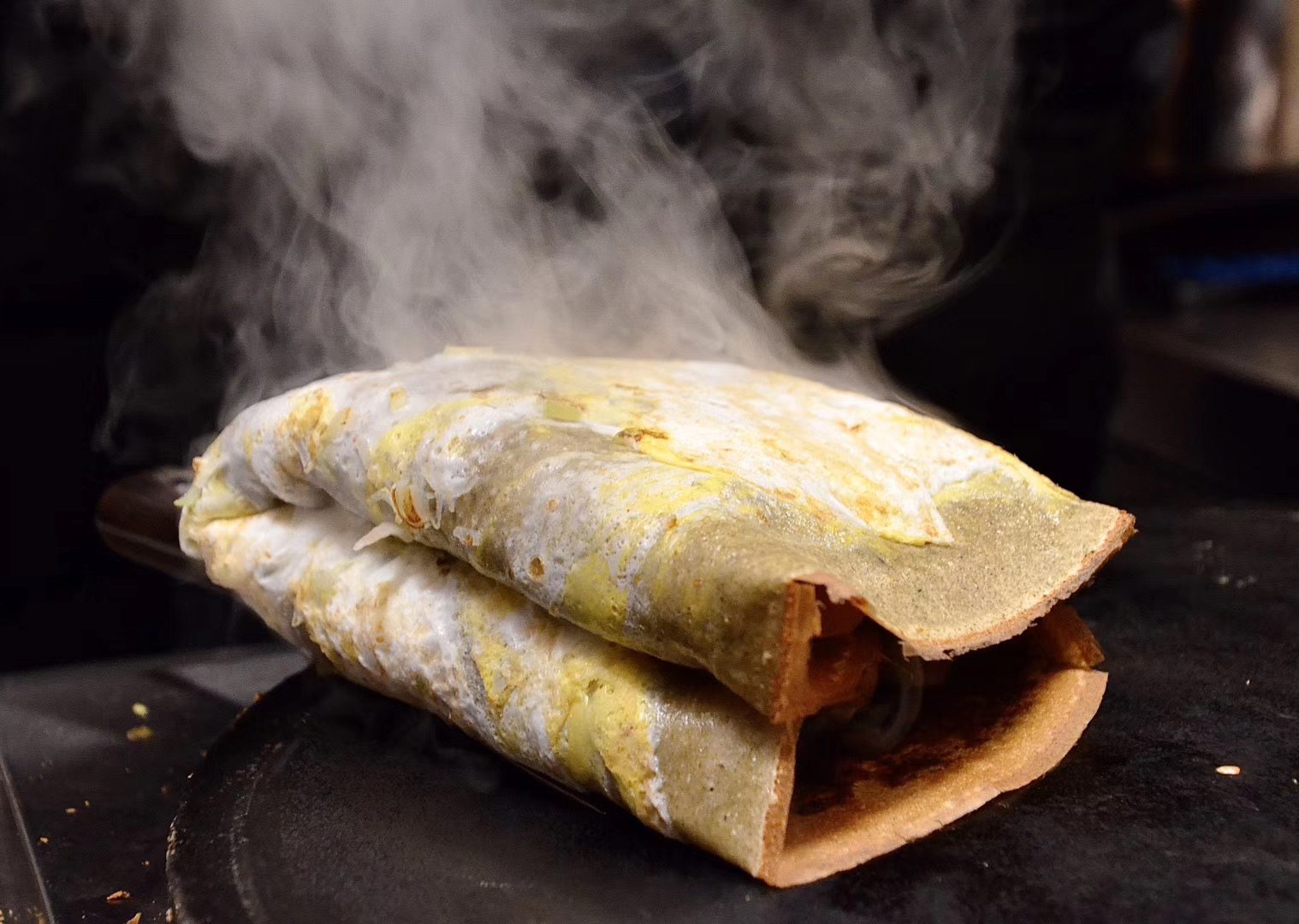
- A Tianjin-style jianbing guozi
- Type: Bing
- Place of origin: China
- Region or state: Shandong and Tianjin
- Associated cuisine: Chinese cuisine
- Main ingredients: Wheat
- Ingredients generally used: Eggs

Jianbing
- Traditional Chinese: 煎餅
- Simplified Chinese: 煎饼
- Literal meaning: fried pancake
Transcriptions
Standard Mandarin
- Hanyu Pinyin: jiānbǐng
- Bopomofo: ㄐㄧㄢ ㄅㄧㄥˇ
Yue: Cantonese
- Jyutping: zin1 beng2
Southern Min
- Hokkien POJ: chian-péng

Jianbing (simplified Chinese: 煎饼; traditional Chinese: 煎餅; pinyin: jiānbǐng; lit. 'pan-fried bing') is a traditional Chinese street food similar to crêpes. It is a type of bing generally eaten for breakfast and hailed as "one of China's most popular street breakfasts." The main ingredients of jianbing are a batter of wheat and grain flour, eggs and sauces, cooked quickly by spreading the batter on a large frying pan or a specialized flat hotplate. It can be topped with different fillings and sauces such as youtiao, baocui (薄脆, thin and crispy fried cracker), ham, chopped or diced mustard pickles, scallions and coriander, chili sauce, or hoisin sauce depending on personal preference. It is often folded several times before serving.

Jianbing has seen international popularization in recent years and can be found in the West, sometimes with modifications to cater to local tastes.

== History ==
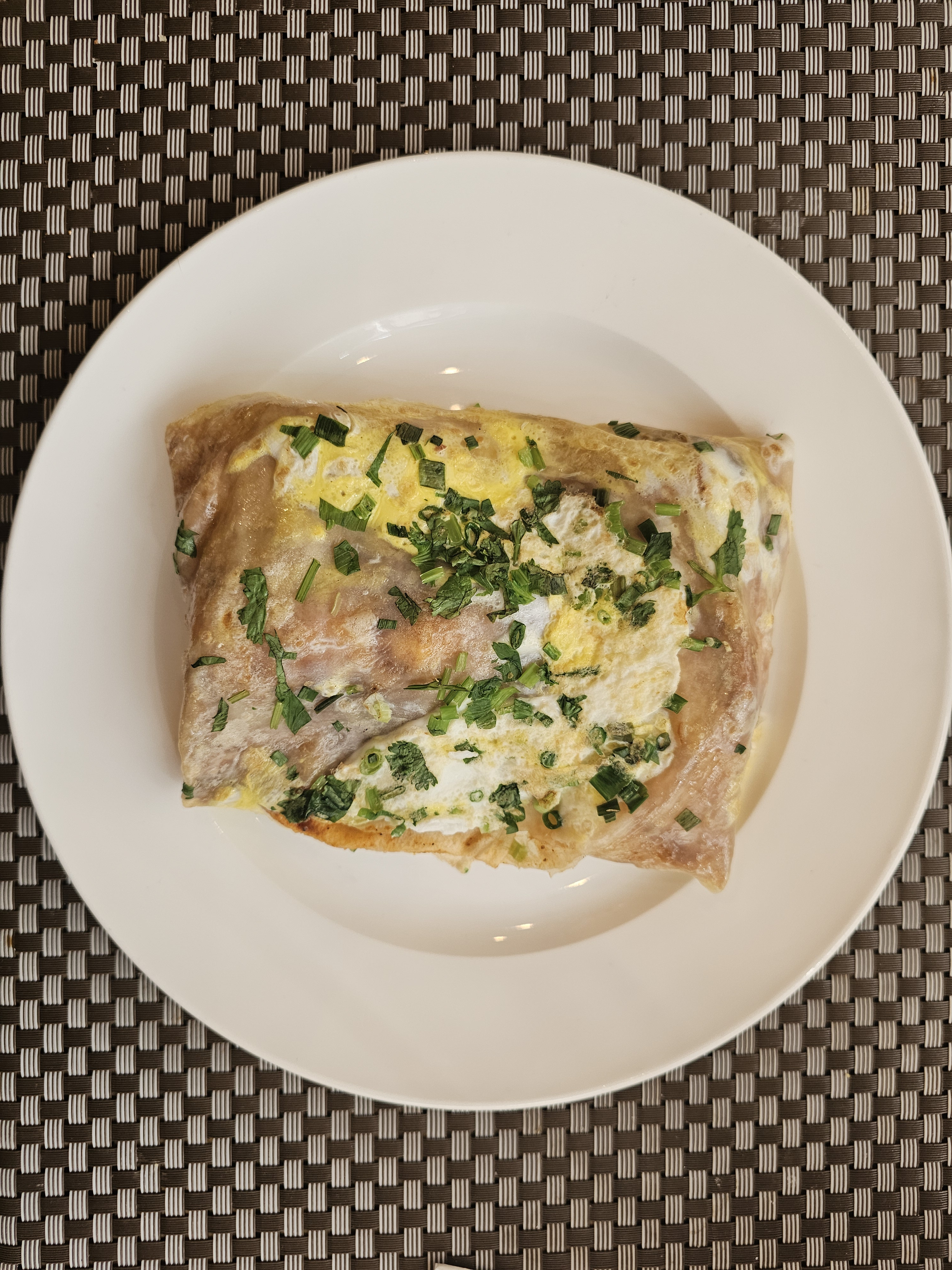
Jianbing with egg and scallion

Jianbing originated in northern China, where wheat- and broomcorn-based flatbreads, pancakes and pies (collectively called bing) are common as staple foods. Its history can be traced back 2,000 years to Shandong province during the Three Kingdoms period (AD 220–280). According to legend, Chancellor Zhuge Liang encountered the problem of feeding his soldiers after they lost their woks. He ordered the cooks to mix water with wheat flour to make batter, then spread it on shields, or flat copper griddles over a flame. The dish raised the soldiers' morale and helped them win the battle. After that, jianbing was passed down through generations in Shandong province and gradually spread to different parts of China. The raw materials used in ancient pancakes should be millet, and millet cereal pancakes are one of the common foods of the ancient northerners. In ancient times, pancakes were made using griddles (Chinese: 鏊; pinyin: ào). Archaeological finds have been discovered in ancient times, except for the prehistoric pottery figurines dating back more than 5,000 years, as well as the iron shovel and bronze gongs belonging to Liao, Song, Jin, Western Xia and Yuan dynasty. Yangshao people have created pottery figurines and the like. The cooking utensils, which were later unearthed in various eras, also found a number of murals of pancakes from different eras, revealing the true existence of pancakes in history.

== Reasons for popularity ==
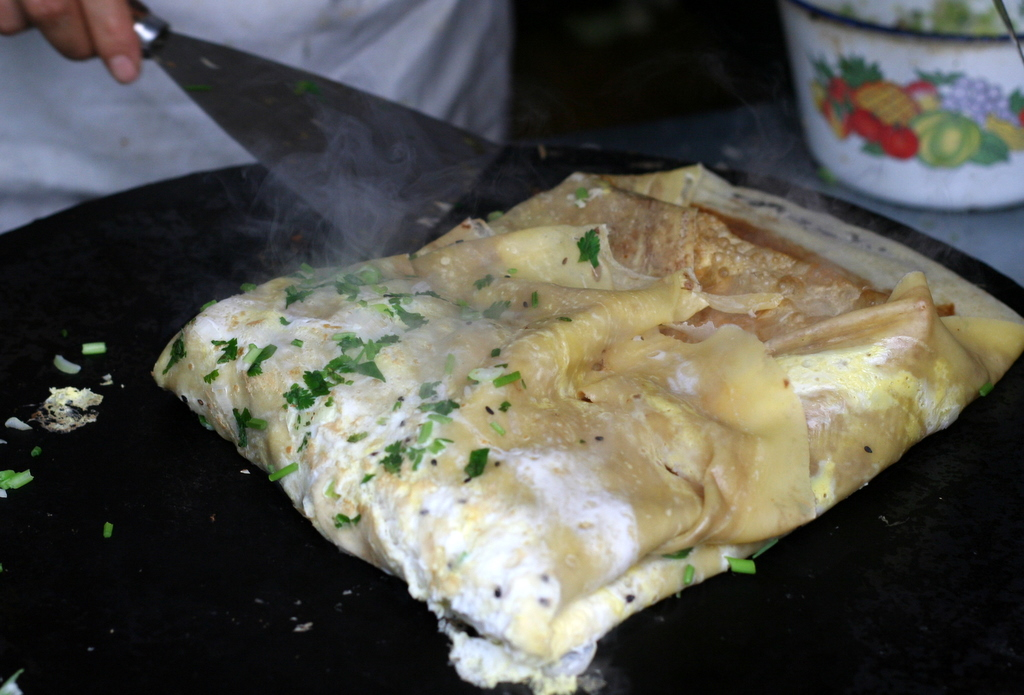
Jianbing being cooked

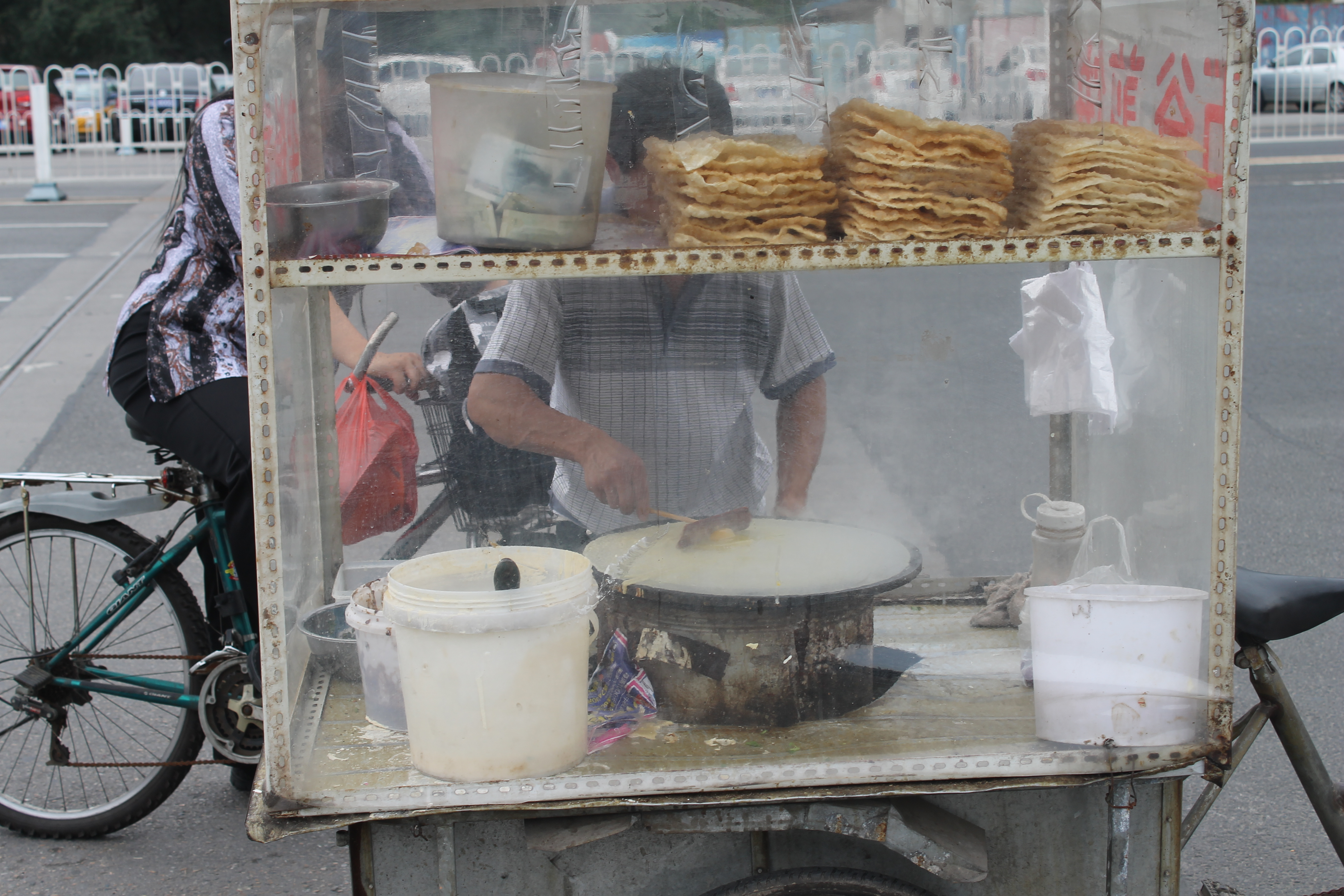
Jianbing being prepared by a street vendor

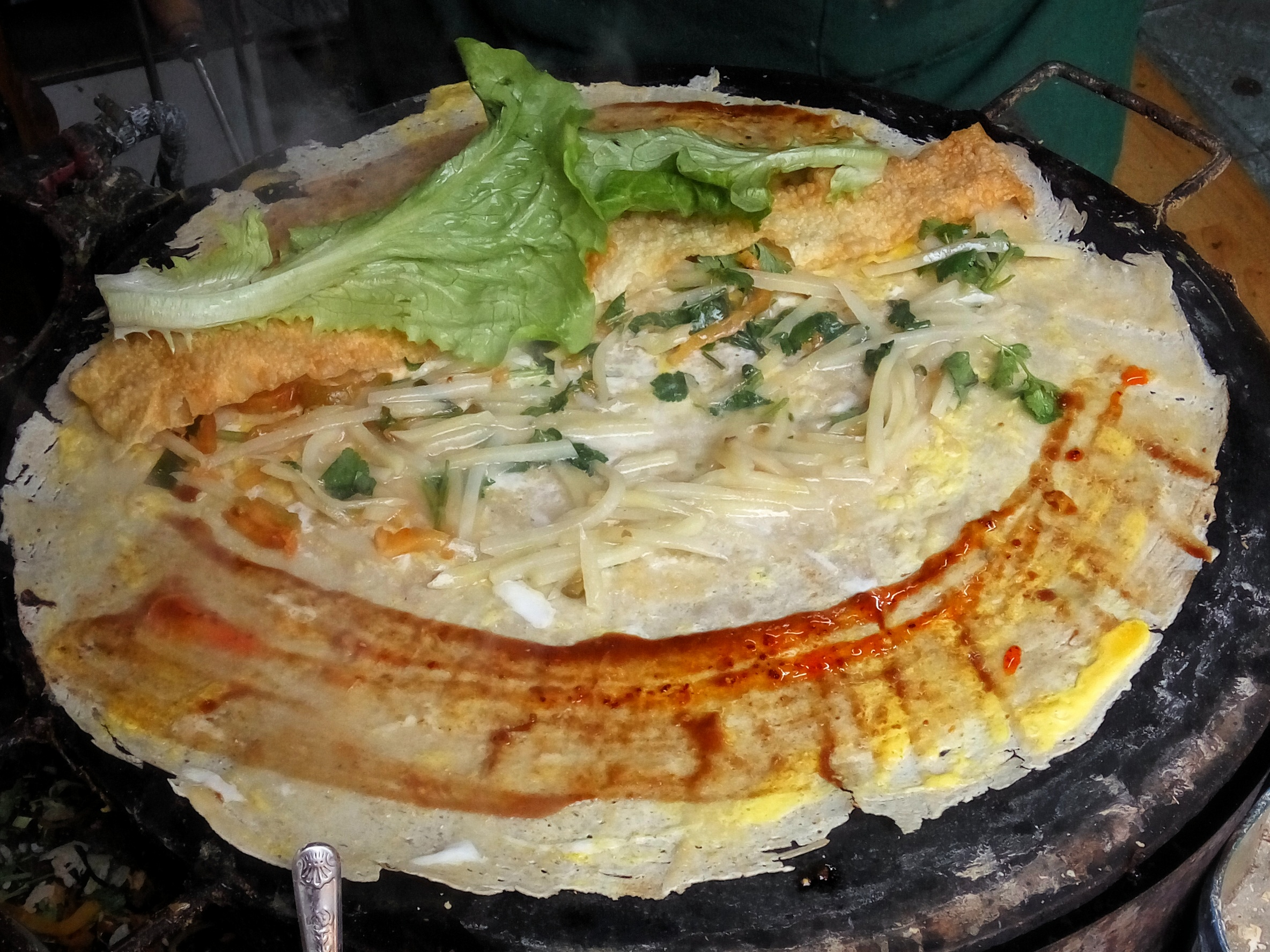
An unwrapped jianbing showing all of the ingredients inside

One of the most popular street breakfasts in China, jianbing can be easily found in many cities. The characteristics of jianbing account for its popularity in China and the West.

First, jianbing is never "pre-cooked". In order to preserve its crispness, customers have to wait for their turn, which often results in a queue, although the preparation time is short. Part of the attraction is that customers can watch the raw ingredients come together to form the dish.

Jianbing can satisfy different people's tastes as it can be made with many different ingredients and mixed with different sauces, jams and flavors in different proportions. According to the vendors outside East China Normal University, though some customers like spicy flavors and some do not like cilantro, they can create their own jianbing.

The low cost of jianbing is also one of the reasons for its popularity, as the basic ingredients are themselves inexpensive.

Additionally, jianbing is a type of bing that has rich nutrient values. It contains abundant nutrients as it can be made of soybeans, mung beans, black beans, lettuce, peanuts and eggs.

== Regional variations ==
The traditional jianbing originated in Shandong and flourished in Tianjin. Jianbing is basically made of flour and eggs with different fillings and sauces. As there are many variations depending on tastes and preferences in different regions, many cities have their own versions of jianbing. Shandong-style jianbing and Tianjin-style jianbing are the two most common versions of jianbing in China.

=== Shandong-style jianbing ===
Jianbing from Shandong province tastes crispy and harder as its batter is formed from the flour mixture that mainly contains coarse grains such as corn, sorghum and millet. In the old days, people had Shandong-style jianbing mainly by rolling it with scallions or serving it with meat soup. Nowadays, the variety of fillings are richer and differ according to one's preference, for example, sweet potatoes, lettuce and pork are also used as fillings.

=== Jianbing guozi ===
Jianbing from Tianjin is a transformation of the jianbing originated in Shandong. It is also called jianbing guozi and guozi refers to its youtiao stuffing. Tianjin-style jianbing tastes softer as its crepe is made of mung bean flour, which contains less gluten. Also, Tianjin-style jianbing is topped with youtiao (fried dough stick), while the Shandong-style one sold by street vendors is usually topped with baocui (薄脆, crispy fried crackers).

== Internationalized jianbing ==
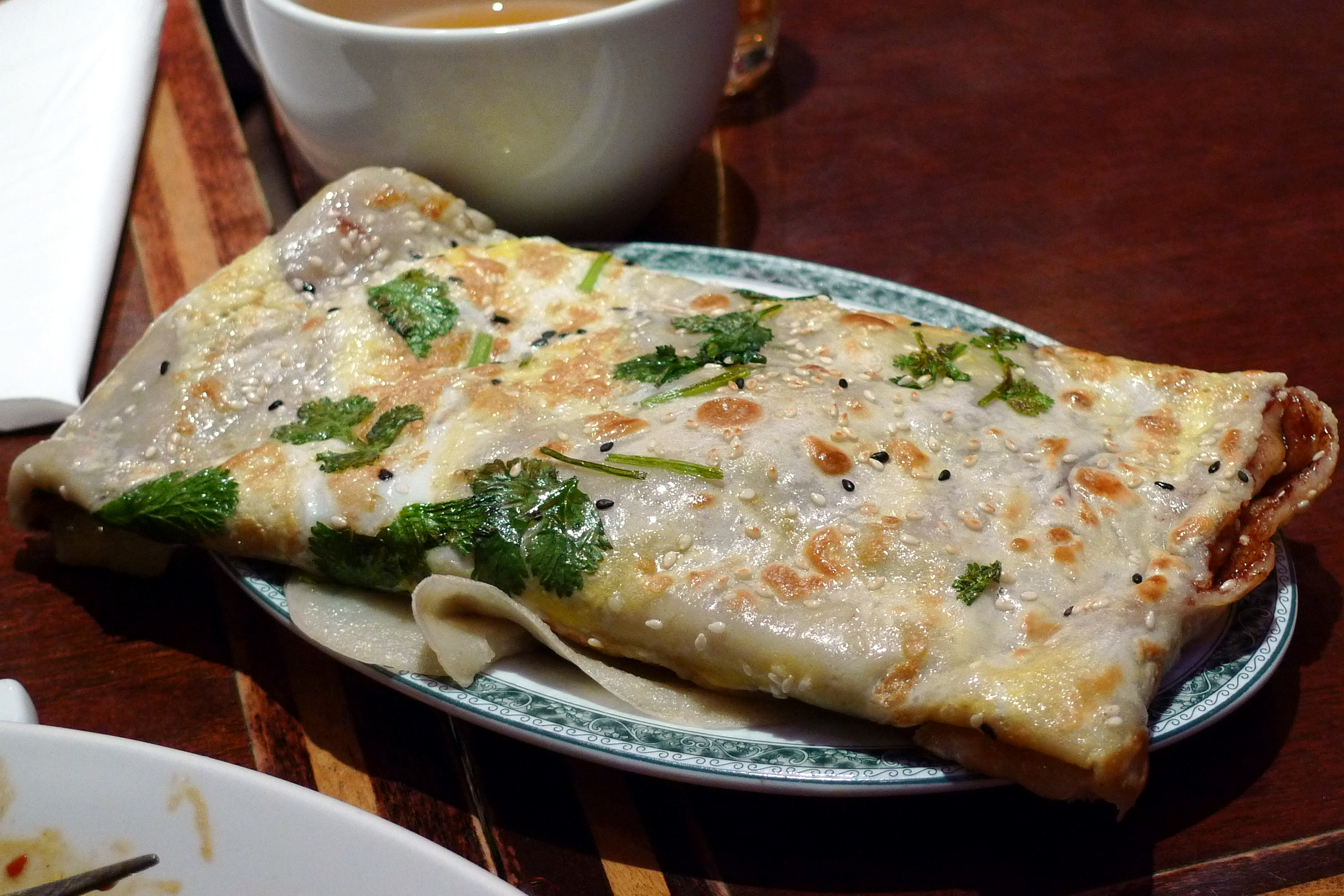
Jianbing in London

Jianbing is also served in the U.K., U.S. and Australia by Western vendors and young Chinese entrepreneurs. In the U.S., it has become one of the newest food trends and gains high popularity among Americans and East Asian customers, particularly Chinese overseas students. Western vendors were inspired to start jianbing business back home after first trying it in China.

Apart from the traditional Chinese jianbing, some vendors in the U.S. offer various versions of it to cater to American customers' taste, such as vegetarian jianbing and gluten-free jianbing. Culture-crossing fillings like barbecue pulled pork, bacon, cheese, hot dogs, and Spam are additionally provided to let customers create their own customized jianbing.

Besides, fillings of jianbing are diverse with new innovations. Tai Chi Jianbing from San Francisco carries fish floss jianbing, which is made with dried tuna. A food truck in New York called “The Flying Pig jianbing” provides different filling options such as dried pork floss, pork belly and bamboo shoots. In another shop called Mr. Bing, the crepe batter is made of millet flour, buckwheat flour and purple rice. Many characterized jianbing are also shown. For example, the cha chaan bing with peanut butter and condensed milk, and the Peking duck bing with the duck sauce, cucumber chunks and duck slices are introduced.

In the UK, street food stall Mei Mei's Street Cart brought jianbing into the London and UK street food scene back in 2012, taking their jianbing to London, Manchester, Leeds, Sheffield and Brighton and winning two awards. They sell the traditional jianbing alongside their 'London' jianbing with fillings such as fried chicken and char siu pork, to build on the traditional jianbing and make it a more substantial dish.

== See also ==
- Jianbing guozi
- Crêpe, a French pancake cooked and served in similar fashion.
- Dosa, a popular South Indian rice crepe cooked and served in a similar fashion.
- Senbei (煎餅), a Japanese rice cracker whose name is cognate to jianbing and is written with the same Chinese characters in Kanji, but is actually a different food.
