= Spring pancake =

Chinese dish

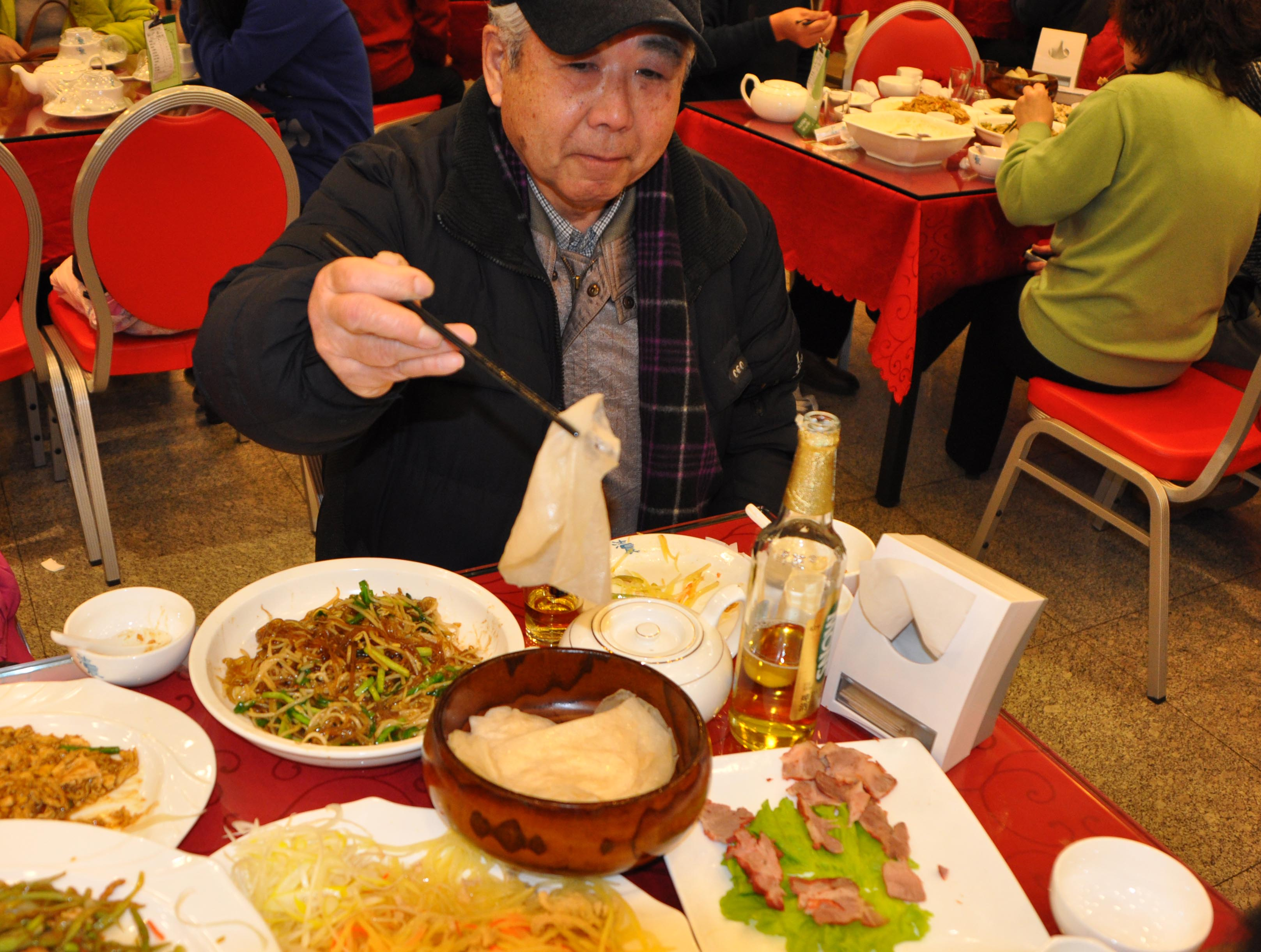
- Eating Spring pancakes on the day of Lichun in a restaurant
- Type: Pancake
- Place of origin: China

The spring pancake (simplified Chinese: 春饼; traditional Chinese: 春餅; pinyin: chūnbǐng) is a traditional Chinese flatbread unique to the northern regions. The pancake is prepared by rubbing oil between two thin layers of leavened dough; after steaming, the pancake can be peeled apart to add fillings. People eat spring pancakes during Lichun to celebrate the beginning spring.

== History ==
The spring pancake took its rise from the Jin dynasty and has prospered since the Tang dynasty. The Lichun was valued by both Chinese ancient kings and civilians. Unlike kings’ great celebrations, civilians celebrated the Lichun by eating spring pancakes wrapped around fresh vegetables and meat, which is called bite-the-spring. Bite-the-spring implies that civilians are praying for a good harvest year by eating fresh vegetables and meat at the beginning of spring. In the Qing dynasty, spring pancakes became a fried pancake wrapped around a filling that included ham, chicken, pork, black dates, scallions, walnuts and sugar. In addition, spring pancakes were one of the nine desserts for the regal banquet of the Qing dynasty. The spring pancake is slightly larger than the pancake that is served with Peking duck. The wrapped, filled pancakes were in later times fried and served as what are called spring rolls.

== Family tradition and Spring Pancake ==
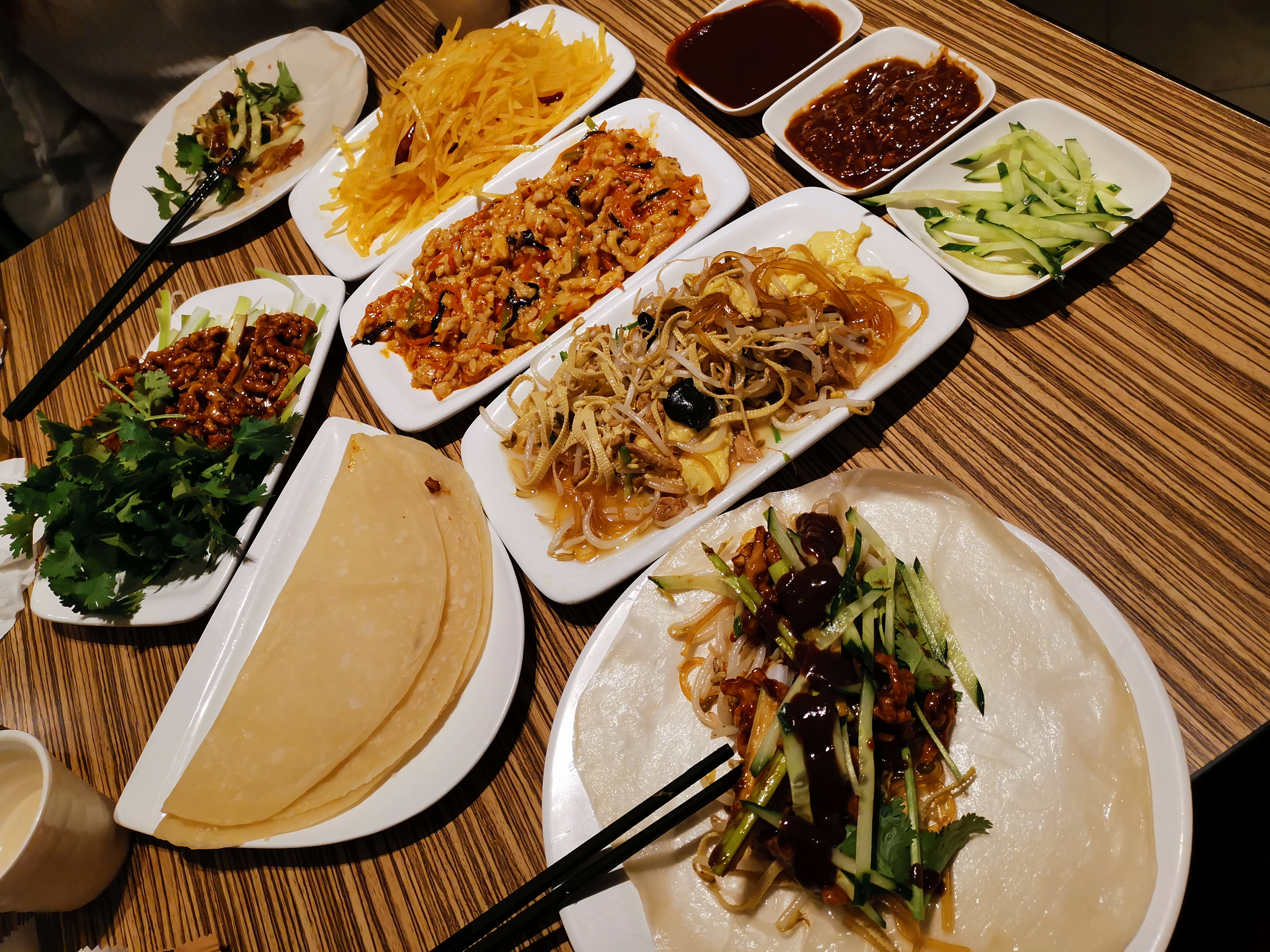
Typical Chinese Dinner with spring pancakes

Spring pancakes are usually being served in spring, to celebrate Lichun. The side dishes are diverse, such as shredded potatoes, cucumber, scallions, and stir-fried vegetables, etc., just like how it is shown in the picture to the right. Many people are needed to prepare for a whole table of various side dishes. Therefore, families like to gather together at this time, make the dishes and enjoy the spring pancake as a party. (pinyin: chūnbǐng) They sit down and chat when they are enjoying the spring pancake. In this case, spring pancakes also serve as a social function which bring families together.

== Spring Pancake Around the World ==
There are many variations of spring pancakes in the diverse regions of China and across the world. Cong you bing, Lao bing, and Paratha are three examples:

- Cong you bing (scallion pancake) is a layered, crispy, chewy variation of spring pancakes originating in Shanghai, China. The main feature is the multiple layered folding approach and the addition of scallions or green onions.
- Lao bing is another type of spring pancake. This pancake is generally larger in size and can be cut into strips and stir fried with other meats and vegetables. Often eaten plain or with simple sauces provides a healthy staple food in meals.
- Paratha is an Indian pancake, originating in medieval Sanskrit, India. It has long origins and is very widespread across the world
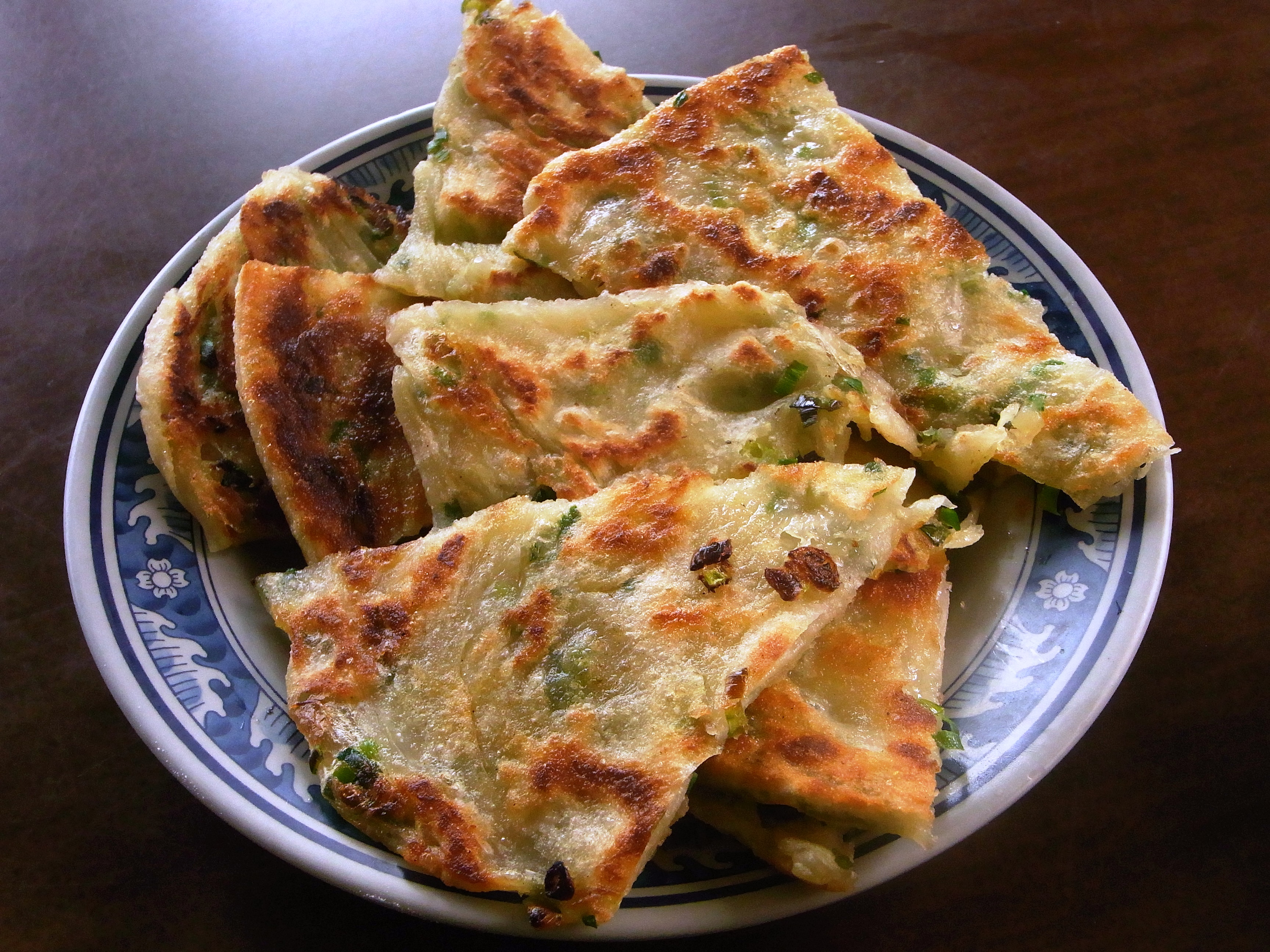
Cong you bing

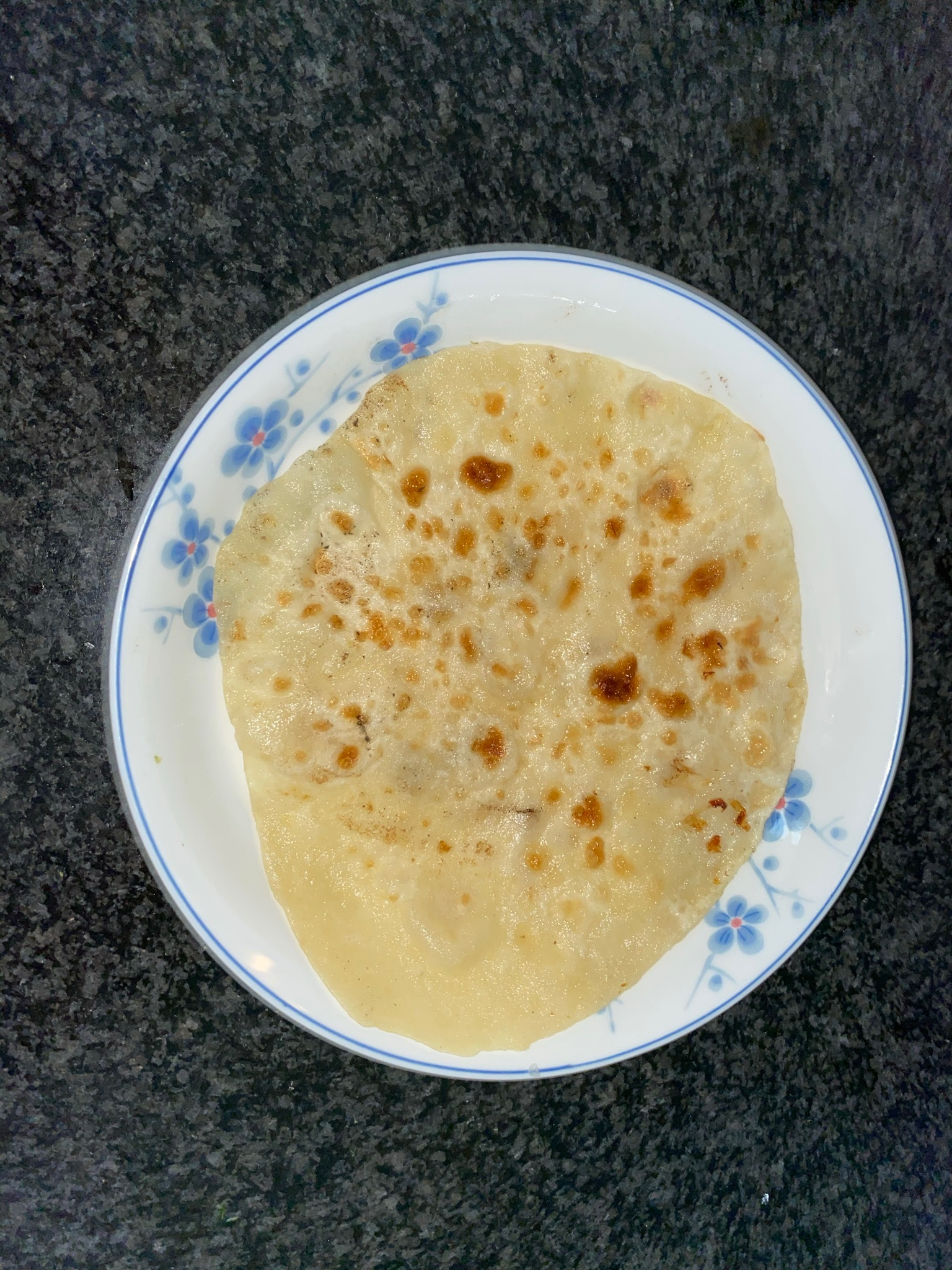
Lao bing

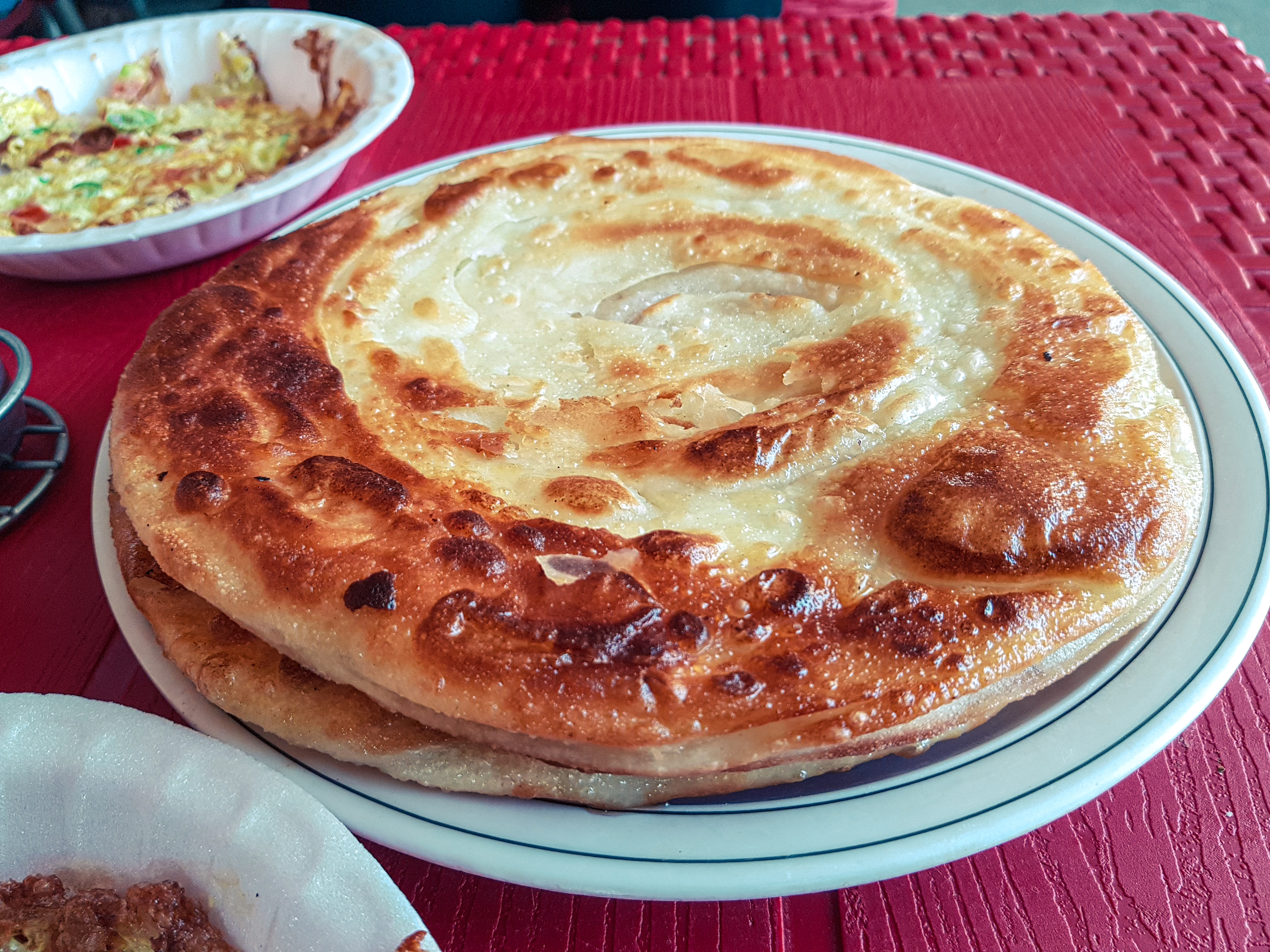
Paratha

== Science of Spring Pancake ==
Important Chinese pancake characteristics include the moisture, texture, and reheat ability over time. Studies have shown that hydrocolloids such as Sodium Alginate, and soluble soybean polysaccharides, have been able to increase the moisture retention of Chinese pancakes while also lowering the staling rate. They have also been shown to improve baking characteristics and the inhibition of starch retrogradation. Free water competition between hydrocolloids and starch reduced the expansion of starch granules, promoting dough consistency, slowing the hardening process, and reducing moisture loss. This is important due to the increasing popularity of commercialization of Chinese pancakes, making taste, longevity, and reheat ability an important consideration.
