= Onion cake =

Cake made with onion

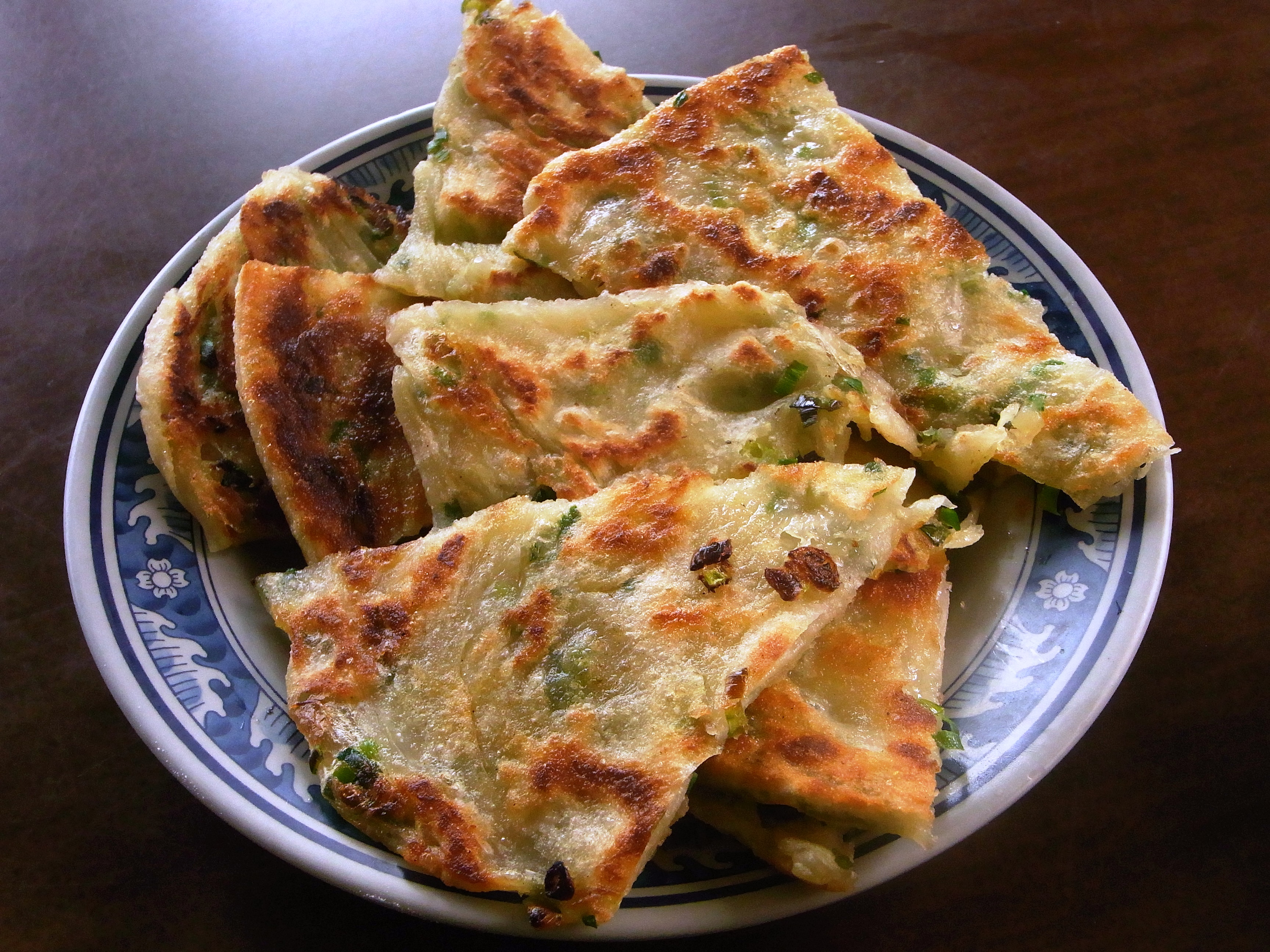
- Cong you bing, a Chinese version of onion cake
- Type: Savoury or sweet cake
- Associated cuisine: China, Germany, Korea, Poland, Switzerland, Wales
- Main ingredients: Onion and/or Spring onion
- Ingredients generally used: Other cake ingredients
- Variations: Laobing, pajeon, the scallion pancake, teisen nionod and zwiebelkuchen

Onion cake is a savory or sweet flatbread or cake prepared using onion as a primary flavoring or stuffing ingredient. Various onion cakes are consumed in China, Canada, Germany, Korea, Switzerland, Poland, Wales and other countries. Several types and varieties of onion cakes exist, including laobing, pajeon, the scallion pancake, cong you ping, teisen nionod, cebularz and zwiebelkuchen.

== Overview ==
Onion cake is prepared using onion or spring onion as a main ingredient along with other typical cake ingredients. The use of boiled onion can reduce the sharpness of the onion's flavor in onion cake. Potato or bacon may also be used as a main ingredient in onion cake. Additional ingredients can include cottage cheese and sour cream. Various onion cakes are consumed in China, Germany, Poland, Switzerland, Wales and in other countries..

Due to translation convention, it is common to translate scallion pancake as Onion Cake, Green Onion Cake, or Spring Onion cake, etc.

== Varieties ==
=== Cebularz ===
Cebularz is commonly sold commonly in Poland and its history can be traced to 14th century.

=== Cong you bing ===
A scallion pancake is a Chinese pancake or unleavened flatbread prepared using scallion as a primary ingredient. It is typically prepared using a dough, although some are prepared from a batter. The scallion pancake is a traditional food in Shanghai, China, and is a common dish throughout the country. A basic Chinese onion cake can consist of flour, lard, spring onion and salt. In China, fresh scallions are typically used in the dish's preparation. The scallion may be fried before it is added to the dough.

==== Edmonton-style green onion cake ====
A variant of the Chinese spring onion pancake popularized by Chef Siu To has become the local specialty of Edmonton, Alberta, Canada. Two variations exist: the version as made by Siu To, which is essentially the same as the original Chinese version, in that it's a pan-fried round pancake shape; and a deep-fried version with a hole in the middle that began to appear after 2015. Chef To attributes the early popularity of his green onion cakes with the large number of Taiwanese expatriates in the area.

=== Laobing ===
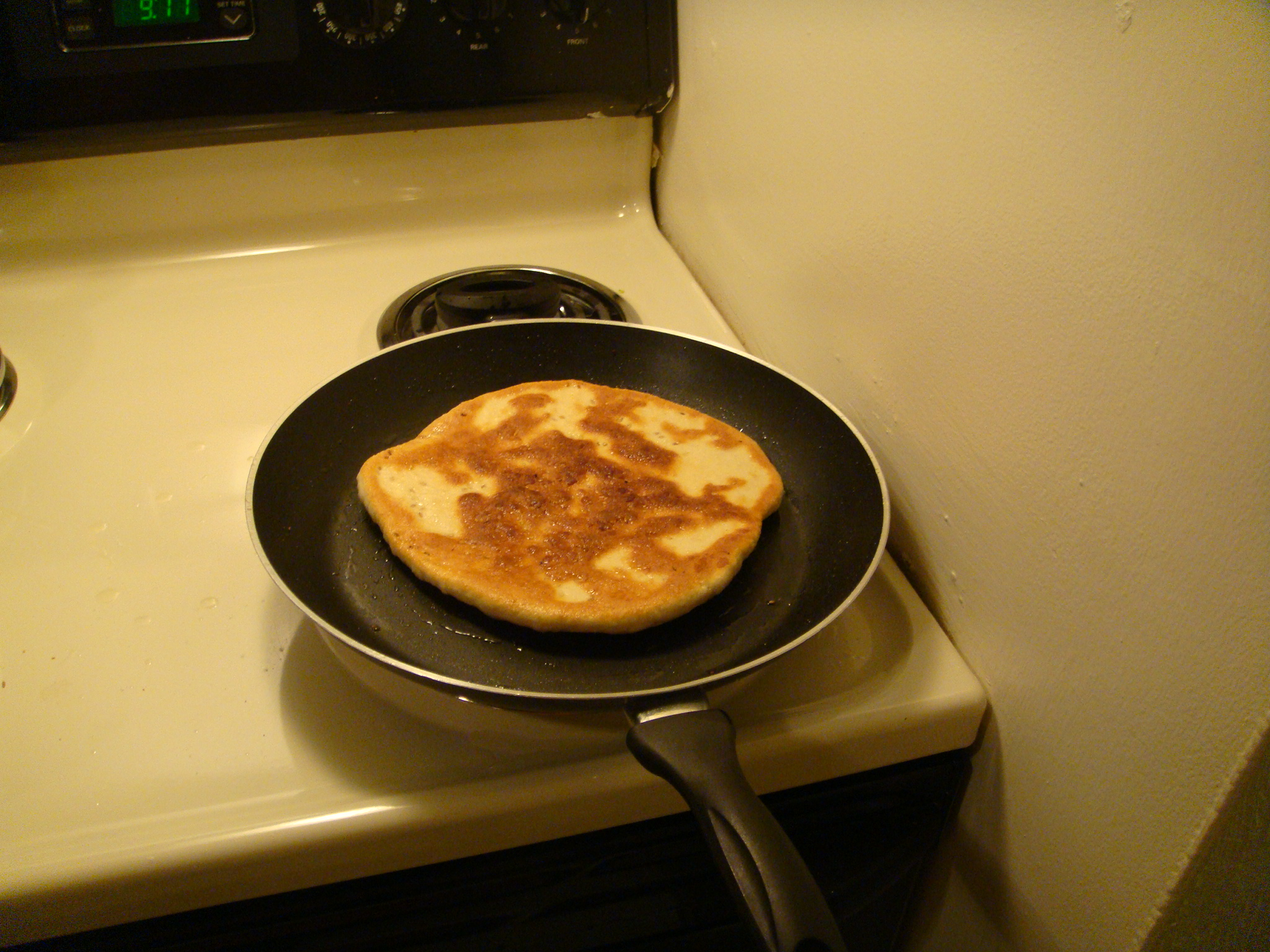
Laobing, a traditional Chinese pan-cake, made with flour, salt, eggs, green onion and other seasonings

Laobing is a pancake or unleavened flatbread in Chinese cuisine that is prepared with flour, water and salt. Scallions may be used as an additional primary ingredient, and scallions are sometimes served as a side dish with laobing.

=== Pajeon ===
Pajeon is a savory jeon (pancake) dish in Korean cuisine prepared with a batter of flour, eggs and green onions or leeks. Rice flour may also be used, along with additional ingredients, such as seafood, pork and beef. Dongnae pajeon is prepared using green onion and seafood.

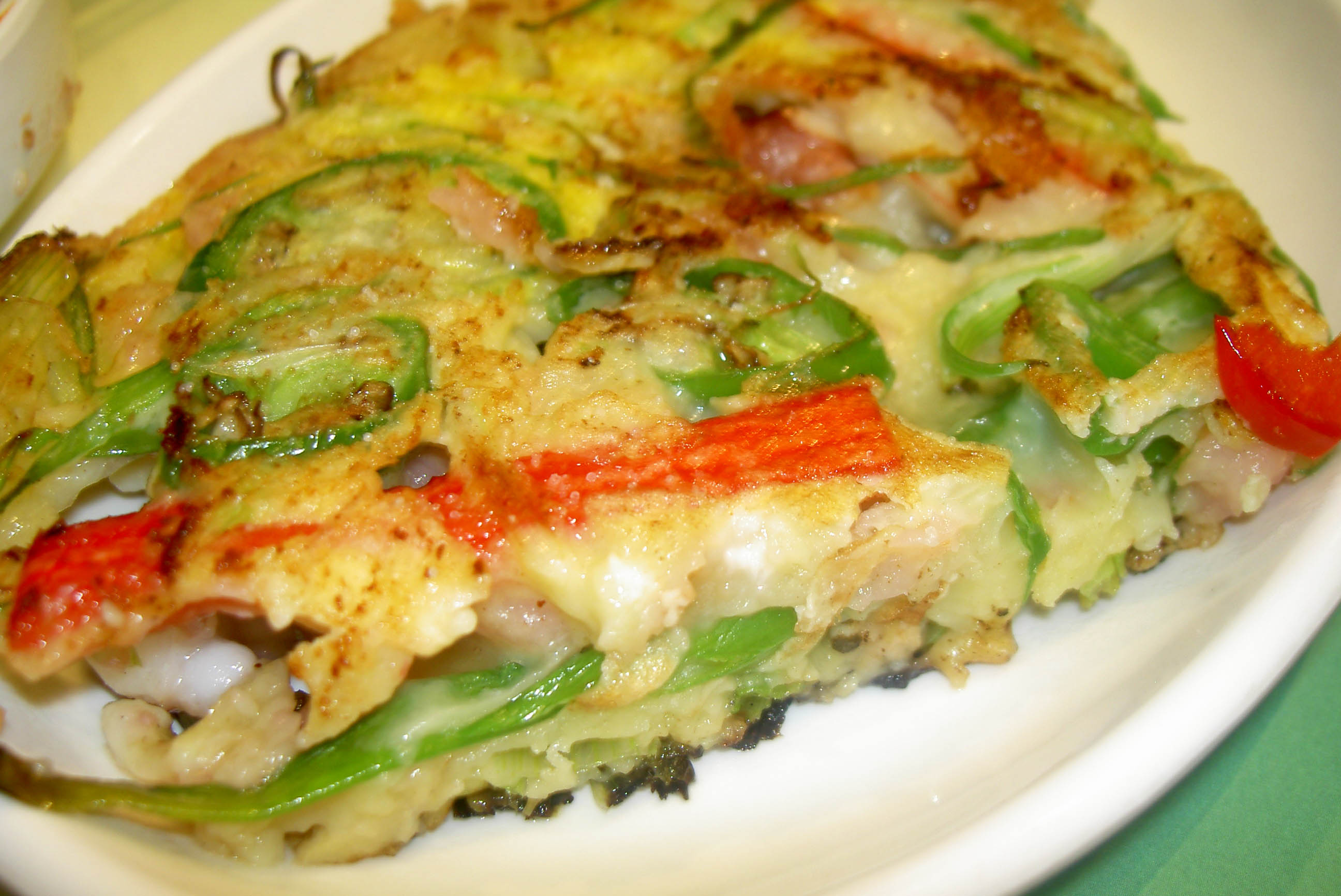
Haemul pajeon is a variety of pajeon in Korean cuisine made with flour, scallion and seafood

=== Teisen nionod ===
Teisen nionod is a Welsh onion cake prepared by layering thin slices of onion, potato with butter. The dish is often served with meat, like lamb or beef, and sometimes the dishes are cooked together, allowing the Teisen Nionod to soak up the meat's juices.

=== Zwiebelkuchen ===
Zwiebelkuchen is a German onion cake or tart prepared with steamed onion, bacon, cream and caraway seeds on leavened or yeast dough.

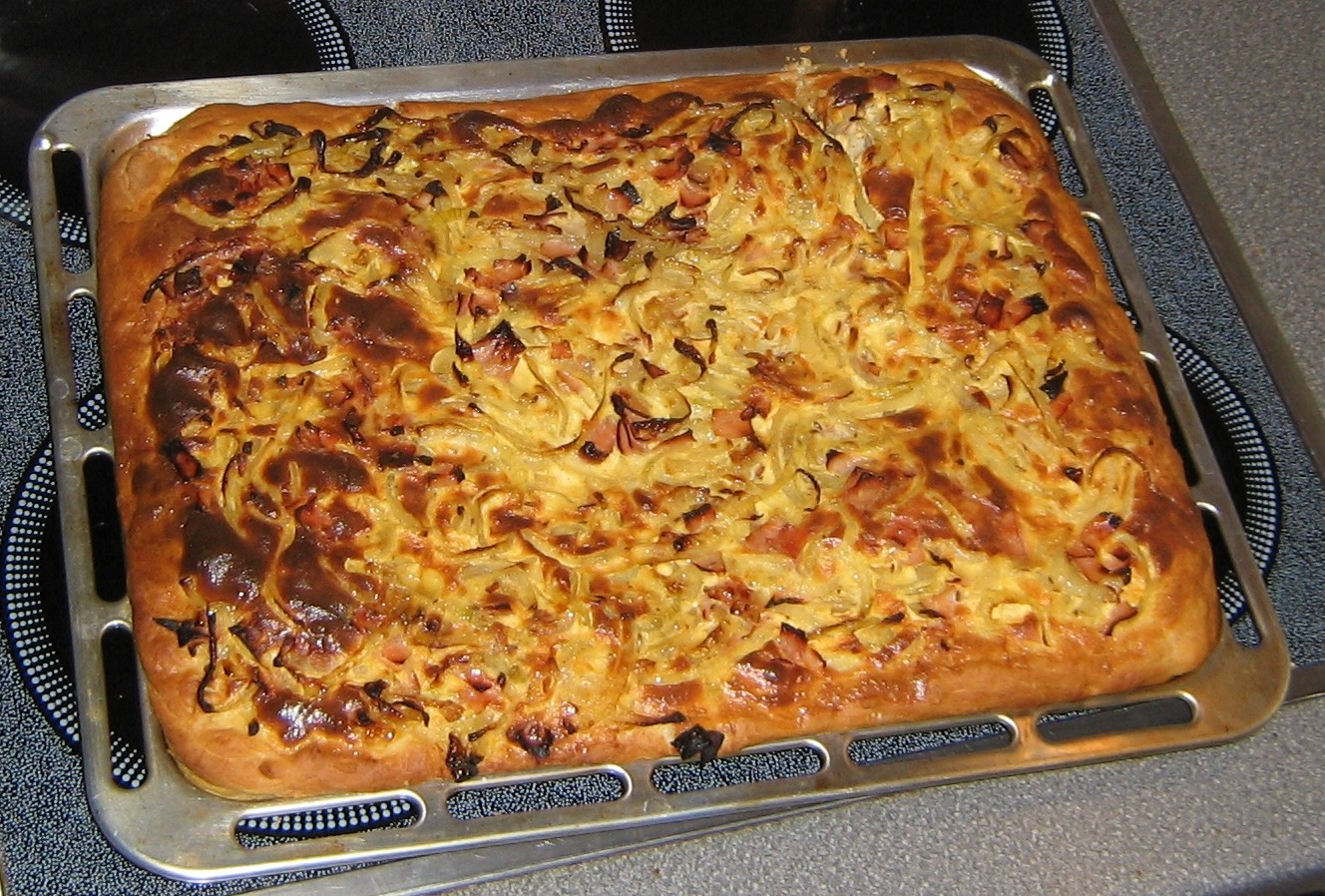
Zwiebelkuchen baked in a sheet pan

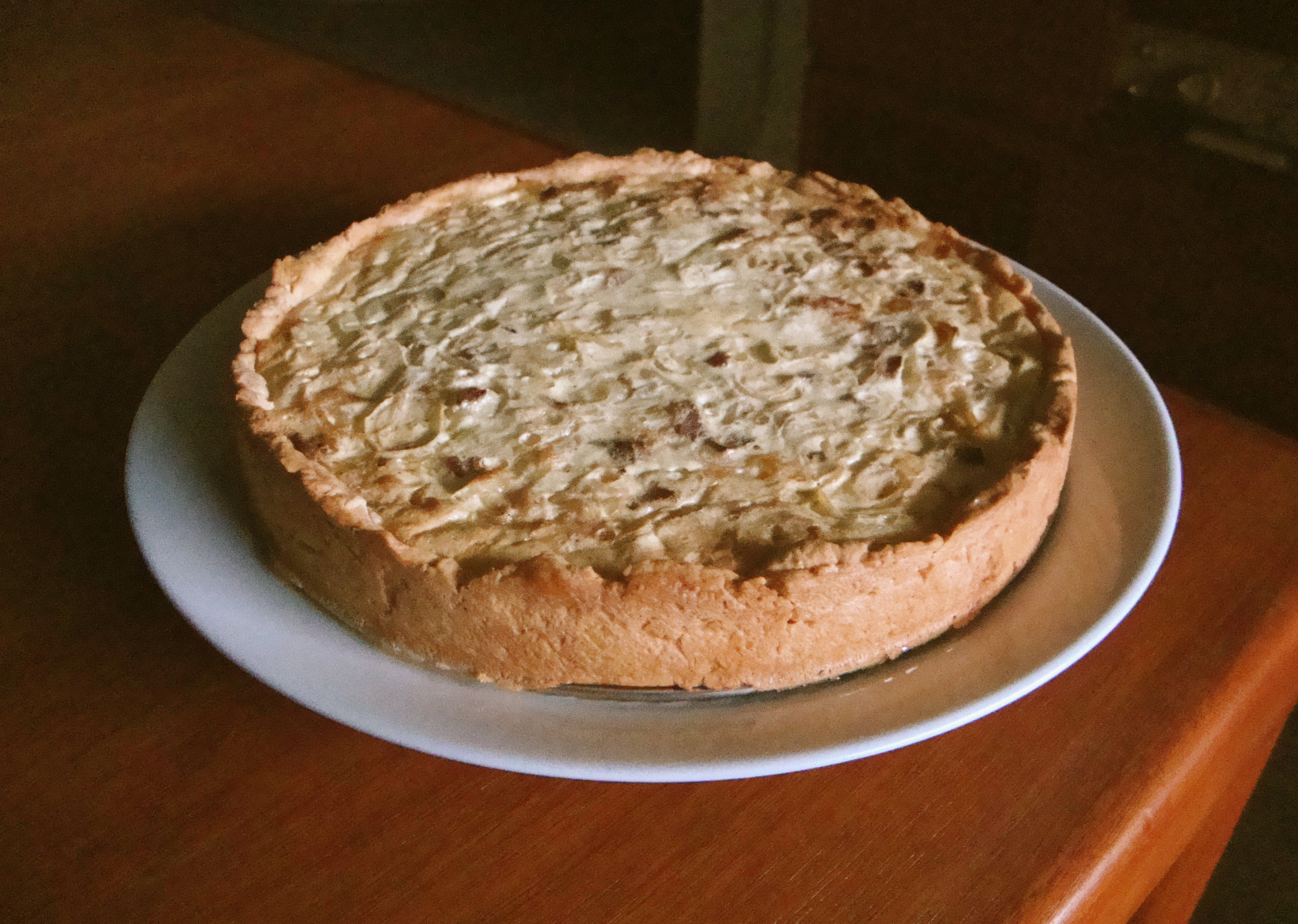
Deep-dish style Zwiebelkuchen

== See also ==
- List of cakes
- List of onion dishes
