= Soda bread =

Wheat bread leavened with baking soda

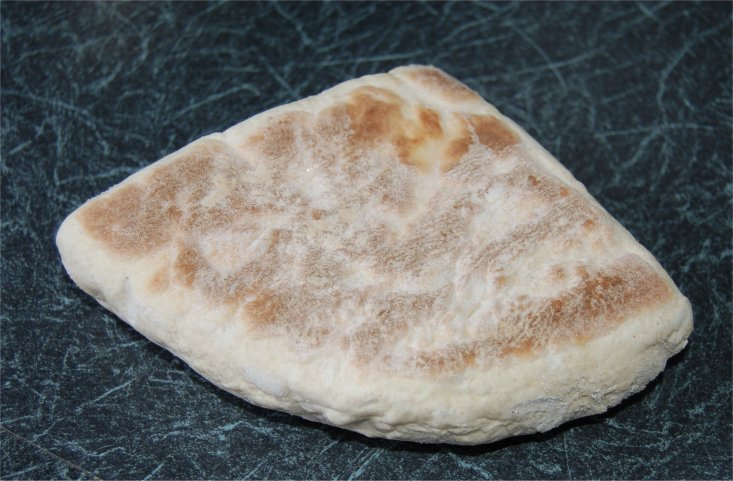
- An Irish soda farl, made by cutting a flattened round of dough into four pieces, then baking
- Type: Quick bread
- Place of origin: United Kingdom
- Main ingredients: Flour, sodium bicarbonate, salt, buttermilk

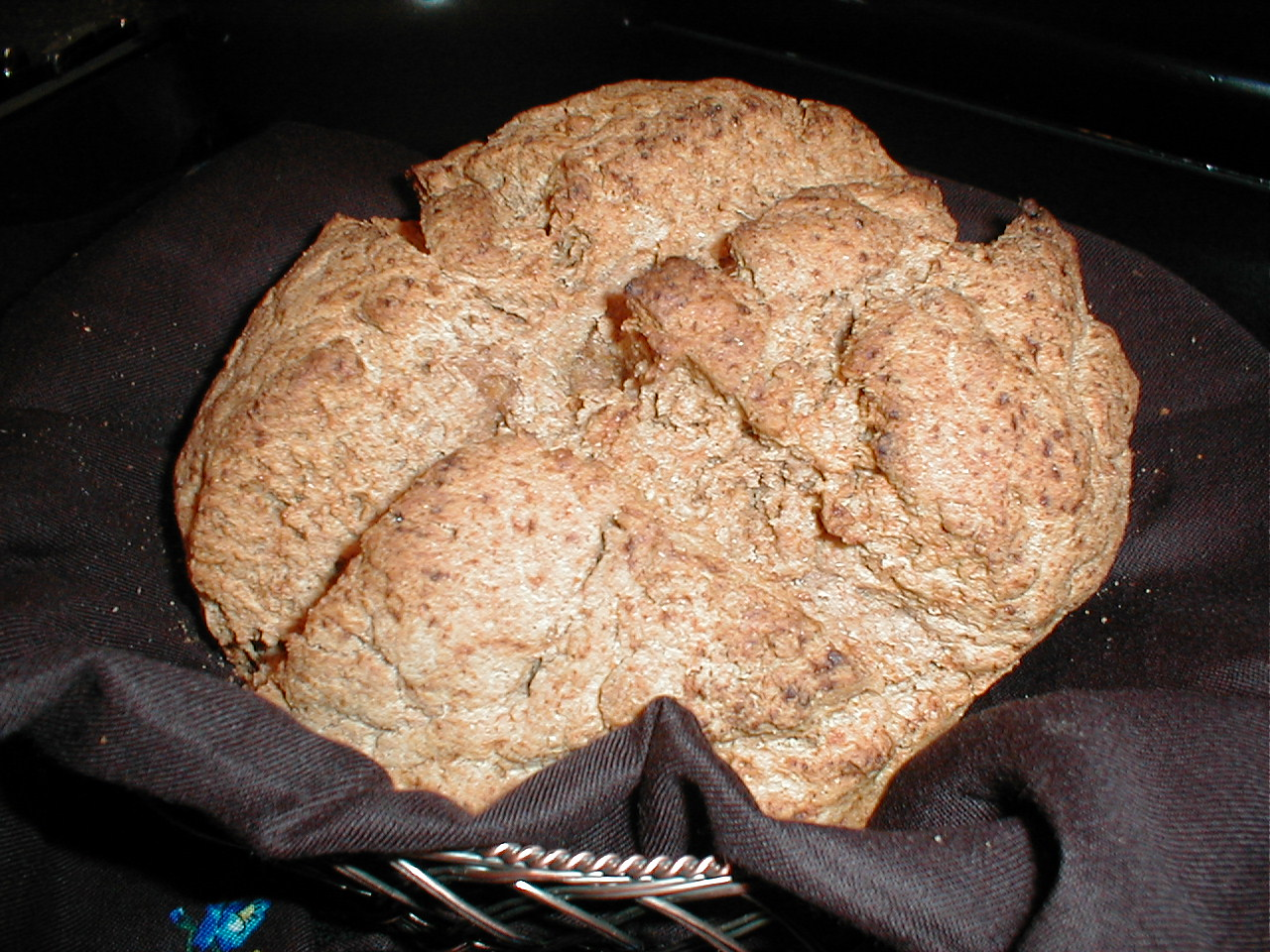
Whole wheat soda bread (known as wheaten bread in parts of Ireland)

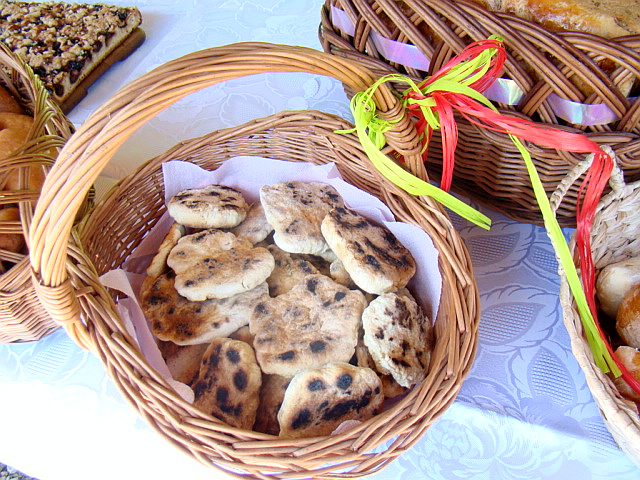
Polish flat soda bread (known as proziaki in Podkarpacie)

Soda bread is a variety of quick bread in many cuisines which uses sodium bicarbonate (baking soda or bread soda) as a leavening agent instead of yeast. The basic ingredients of soda bread are flour, baking soda, salt, and buttermilk. The lactic acid in the buttermilk reacts with the baking soda to form bubbles of carbon dioxide. Optional ingredients include butter, egg, raisins, or nuts. Quick breads can be prepared quickly and reliably, without requiring the time and labor needed for kneaded yeast breads.

== Preparation ==
Soda bread is made with coarse flour, white, whole meal, or a mix. High-protein flour is not used because the preferred texture is "moist and crumbly". Other grains (such as rolled oats) may be added. Soda bread is generally not kneaded because kneading can toughen it.

Buttermilk or sour milk is the usual liquid acid ingredient.

Variants may add olive oil, eggs, molasses, sugar, treacle, or honey.

== Regional varieties ==
=== Ireland ===
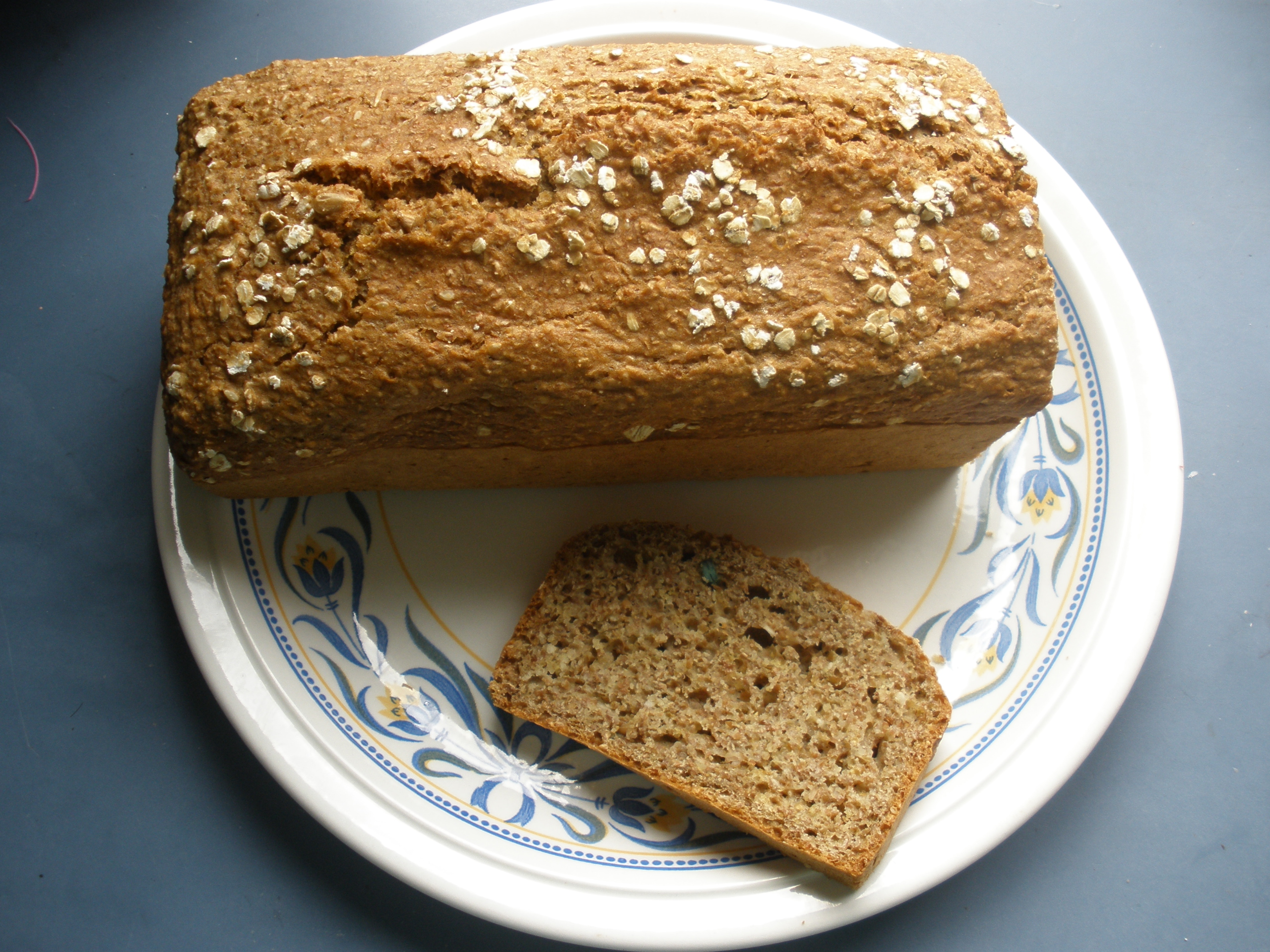
Home-made Irish brown soda bread

Irish bread was historically cooked on a griddle as flatbread because the domestic flours did not have the properties needed to rise effectively when combined with yeast. Baking soda offered an alternative, but its popularity declined for a time when imported high-gluten flours became available. Brown soda bread (served with smoked salmon) reappeared on luxury hotel menus in the 1960s. Modern varieties can be found at Irish cafes and bakeries, some made with Guinness, treacle, walnuts, and herbs, although the sweetened version with caraway and raisins is now rare. Soda bread made with raisins is colloquially called "spotted dog" or "spotted dick".

In Ireland, the flour is typically made from soft wheat, so soda bread is best made with a cake or pastry flour (made from soft wheat), which has lower levels of gluten than a bread flour. In some recipes, the buttermilk is replaced by live yogurt or even stout. Because the leavening action starts immediately (compared to the time taken for yeast bread to rise), bakers recommend the minimum amount of mixing of the ingredients before baking; the dough should not be kneaded.

Various forms of soda bread are popular throughout Ireland. Soda breads are made using wholemeal, white flour, or both. In Ulster, the wholemeal variety is usually known as wheaten bread and is normally sweetened, while the term "soda bread" is restricted to the white savoury form. In the southern provinces of Ireland, the wholemeal variety is usually known as "brown bread" and is almost identical to the Ulster wheaten. In some parts of Fermanagh, the white-flour form of the bread is described as "fadge".

"Griddle cakes" and "griddle bread" (or "soda farls" in Ulster) take a more rounded shape and have a cross cut in the top to allow the bread to expand. The griddle cake or farl is a more flattened type of bread. It is cooked on a griddle, allowing it to take a more flat shape, and it is split into four sections. The soda farl is one of the distinguishing elements of the Ulster fry, where it is served alongside potato bread, also in farl form.

=== Scotland ===
In Scotland, varieties of soda breads and griddle sodas include bannocks and farls (Scots: fardel, "a fourth"), soda scones, or soda farls, using baking powder or baking soda as a leavening agent to make it light and airy.

Bannocks are flat cakes of barley or oatmeal dough formed into a round or oval shape, then cooked on a griddle (Scots: girdle). From the early 19th century, bannocks have been made using baking powder, or a combination of baking soda and buttermilk or clabbered milk. Before the 19th century, bannocks were cooked on a bannock stone (Scots: stane), a large, flat, rounded piece of sandstone, placed directly onto a fire, then used as a cooking surface. Varieties of bannock include Selkirk bannocks, beremeal bannocks, Michaelmas bannock, Yetholm bannock, and Yule bannock.

The soda farl is used in the full Scottish breakfast along with the potato scone (Scots: tattie scone).

=== Serbia ===
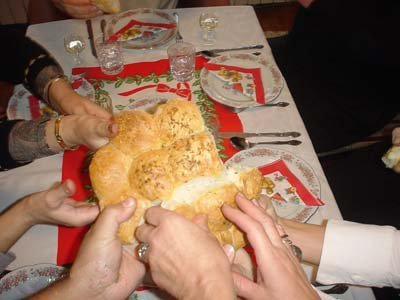
Members of a Serbian family break soda bread or česnica at a Christmas dinner.

In Serbian tradition, soda bread -- česnica -- is served for Christmas dinner. A coin or other small object is often put into the dough. The loaf is rotated three times counter-clockwise, before being broken among the family members. The person who finds the coin in their piece of the bread will supposedly be exceptionally lucky in the coming year. Before baking, the upper surface of the loaf may be inscribed with various symbols, such as a Christogram, or stars, circles, and impressions of keys or combs.

=== United States of America ===
During the early years of European settlement of the Americas, settlers used soda or pearl ash, more commonly known as potash (pot ash) or potassium carbonate, as a leavening agent (the forerunner to baking soda) in quick breads. By 1824, The Virginia Housewife by Mary Randolph was published containing a recipe for Soda Cake.

In 1846, two American bakers, John Dwight and Austin Church, established the first factory in the United States to produce baking soda from sodium carbonate and carbon dioxide.

Modern American versions of Irish soda bread often include raisins or currants, and caraway seeds.

== See also ==
- Proziaki
- List of breads
- List of Irish dishes
- List of quick breads
