= Zwiebelkuchen =

German onion cake

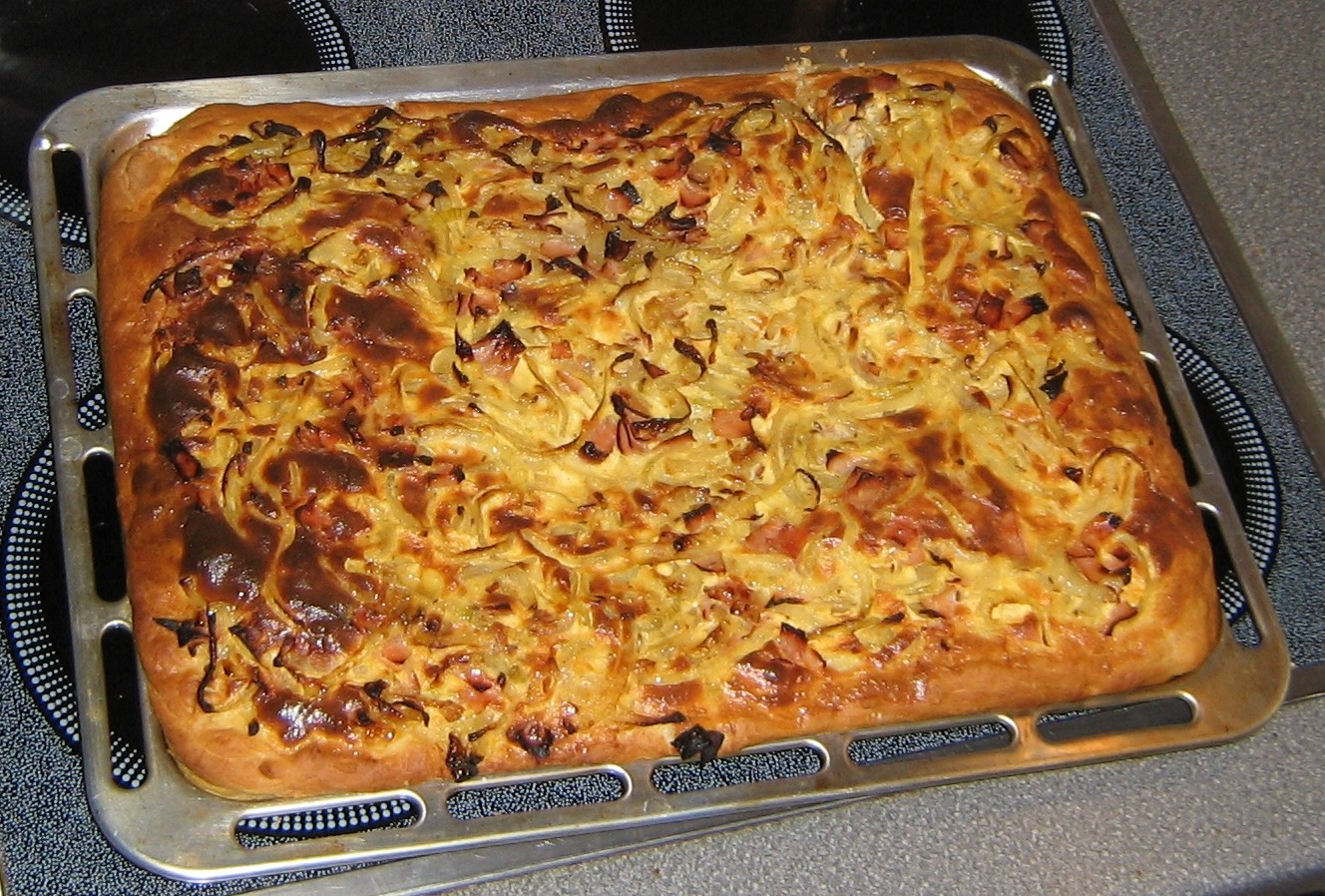
- Zwiebelkuchen in a sheet pan
- Type: Pie
- Place of origin: Germany
- Main ingredients: Yeast or leavened dough, onions, bacon, cream, caraway seeds

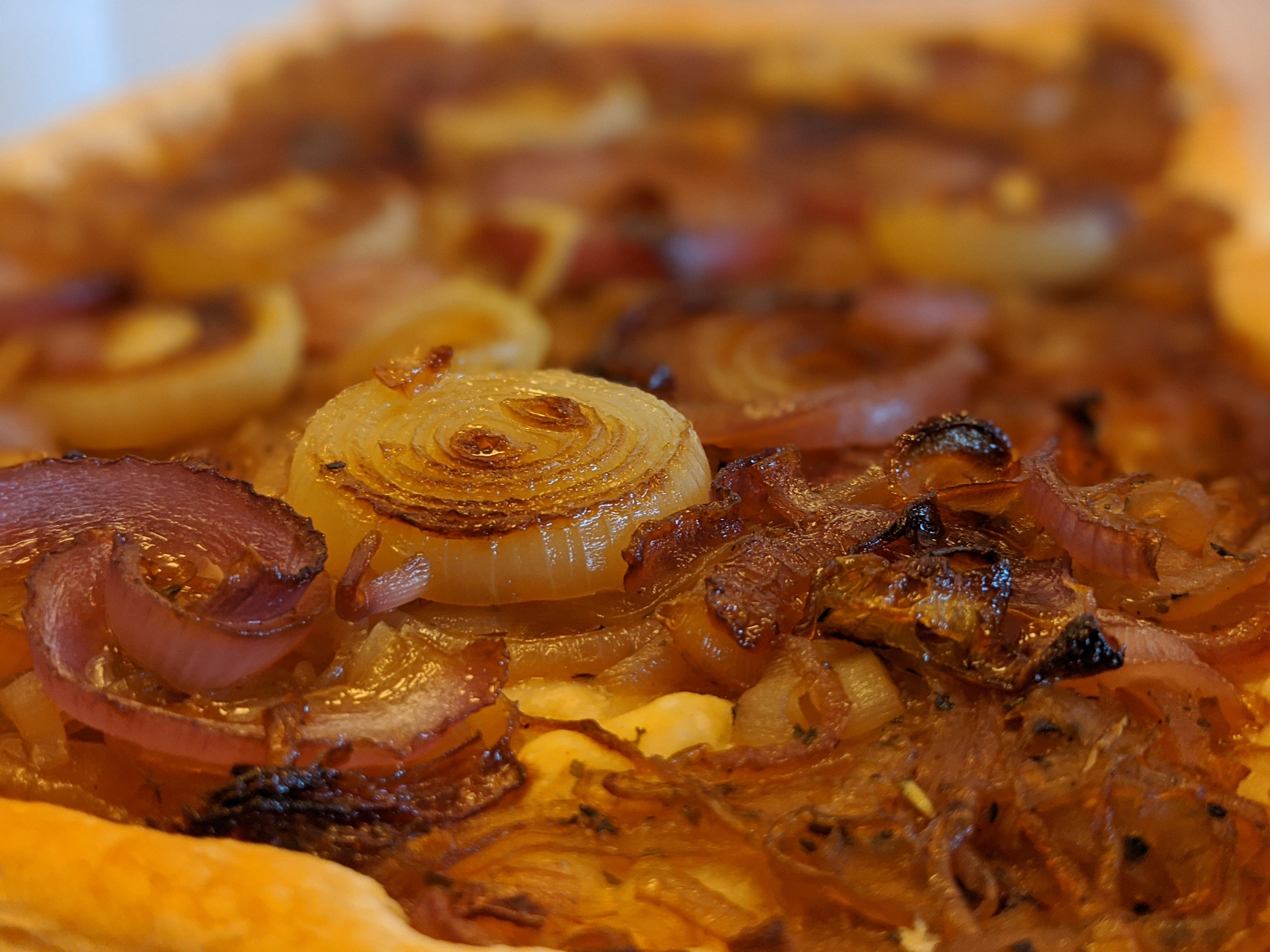
Close up showing cooked onions on the surface of a zwiebelkuchen

Zwiebelkuchen (German pronunciation: [ˈt͜sviːbl̩ˌkuːxn̩], lit. 'onion cake') is a savory German onion cake made of steamed onions, diced bacon, cream, and caraway seeds on either a yeast or leavened dough. It is not to be confused with Flammkuchen, a similar dish that is drier.

== History ==
Most of Zwiebelkuchen's history is unknown, but has been mentioned as early as the 19th century and originates from Baden-Württemberg.

Zwiebelkuchen is a favored autumn dish commonly enjoyed at wine festivals. It is particularly popular in Germany's wine-producing regions, including Thuringia, Palatinate, Hessia, Franconia, Baden, Swabia, Alsace, and the Rhine and Moselle areas. People enjoy drinking "neuer Wein" with it. "Neuer Wein" is slightly fermented grape juice, before the squeezed grapes turn into proper wine to be bottled.

== See also ==
- Flammkuchen, similar Alsatian and south-western German dish
- List of onion dishes
