= Proziaki =

Polish soda bread

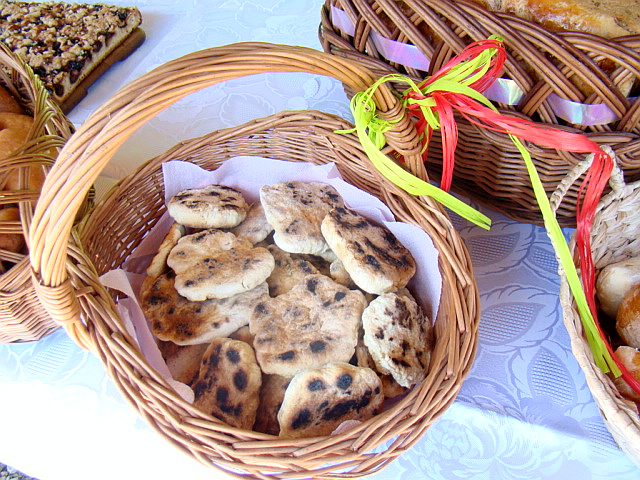
- Proziaki at the Sanok open-air museum
- Alternative names: Prozioki, prołzioki, sodziaki
- Type: Soda bread
- Course: Side dish, dessert
- Place of origin: Carpathian Mountains and foothills, Poland
- Serving temperature: Hot or cold
- Main ingredients: Flour, soured milk

Proziaki (singular: proziak), also known as sodziaki and dialectally prozioki or prołzioki, refers to a Polish soda bread originating in the foothills and mountainous areas of the Carpathians in south-eastern Poland.

Their preparation involves making small flour-based rolls with added sodium bicarbonate (known as proza in the regional dialect) and soured milk or kefir.

Proziaki are traditionally produced by the use of wheat flour or wheat–rye flour, soured milk, salt, and sodium bicarbonate; they were traditionally baked on clay, cast iron, or tiled stovetops (nalepa) heated by firewood. Some recipes may call for eggs, śmietana (sour cream), or water to be added, or may substitute the baking soda with baking ammonia and/or soured milk with kefir. Sweet variants can be made with the addition of sugar. Proziaki can be circular (diameter of 6–10 cm, thickness c. 1.5 cm) or quadrilateral. Presently, most proziaki are baked in an oven pan with a small amount of fat or lard (smalec).

In many Subcarpathian villages, proziaki are diversified by adding buttermilk, cottage cheese, or more butter. Traditionally, proziaki are served with fresh butter and salt, cottage cheese, or marmalade. Eating proziaki is frequently followed by drinking sweet or soured milk.

The recipe for proziaki derives from the more archaic podpłomyk flatbread recipe altered to include a baking soda leavening, and as such, the two breads are sometimes considered synonymous in some areas of Poland.
