= Podpłomyk =

Slavic flatbread

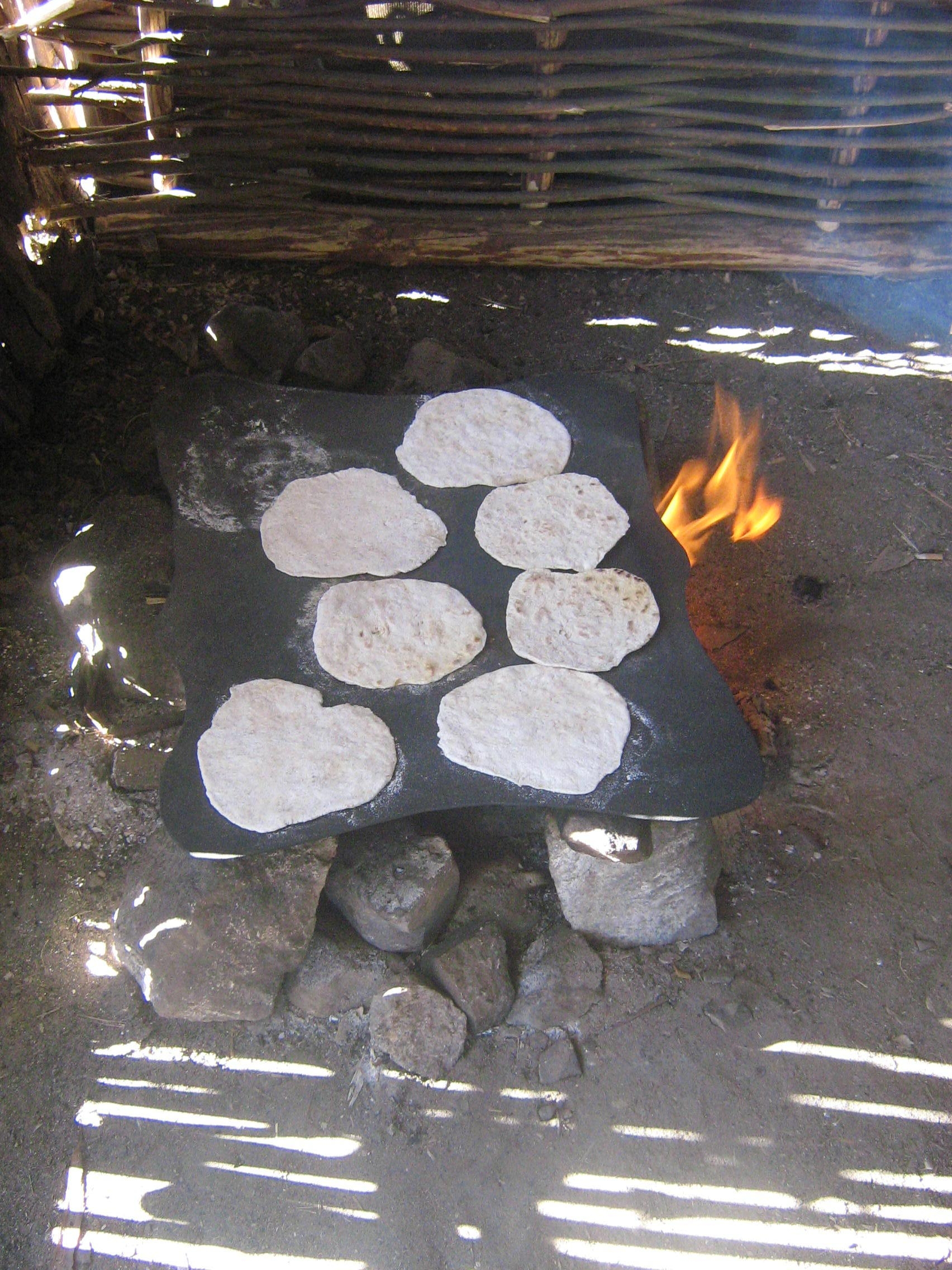
- Traditional preparation of Polish podpłomyki on a stone hearth
- Alternative names: Wychopień, wychopieniek
- Type: Flatbread
- Place of origin: Poland
- Serving temperature: Hot or cold
- Main ingredients: Flour

Podpłomyk (from Polish pod – 'under', płomyk – 'flame'; plural: podpłomyki), known in Old Polish as wychopień or wychopieniek, is the oldest known Slavic form of bread, in the form of a small flatbread baked on an open fire. It has been preserved to the modern day as a part of Polish cuisine.

Podpłomyki are prepared with flour, water, and salt, and traditionally buttered or smeared with słonina when ready. Earlier forms of podpłomyki were sometimes made with leftover sourdough from breadmaking.

Podpłomyki were a common food among the early Slavs, who baked them on stones heated by fire. Today, outside of Poland, similar flatbreads may be found in the cuisine of Ukraine, known as perepichka/перепічка or pidpalok/підпалок, though often with the addition of yeast and prepared on a pan greased with fat or salo, differing from the archaic recipe.

== Etymology ==
The name podpłomyk is derived from the Polish roots pod – 'under' and płomyk – 'flame', referring to the cooking method being on an open fire as opposed to a bread oven. The earliest surviving recorded mention of podpłomyki is in the Latin language from the 15th century: Ecce ad caput suum subcinericius panis, pothplomyk, et vas aque oraz Iussit (sc. Abraham) Saray, vxori sue, ut faceret panes subcinericios pothplomiky (1453). Another survives in a short recipe from a medieval manuscript written in 1473 in Old Polish: Wesmy trzi myarky møky a zamyesszy, a vczyn potplomik chleba (subcinericios panes), or, "Take three measures of flour and mix, and make thus a podpłomyk bread (subcinericios panes)".

== Preparation ==
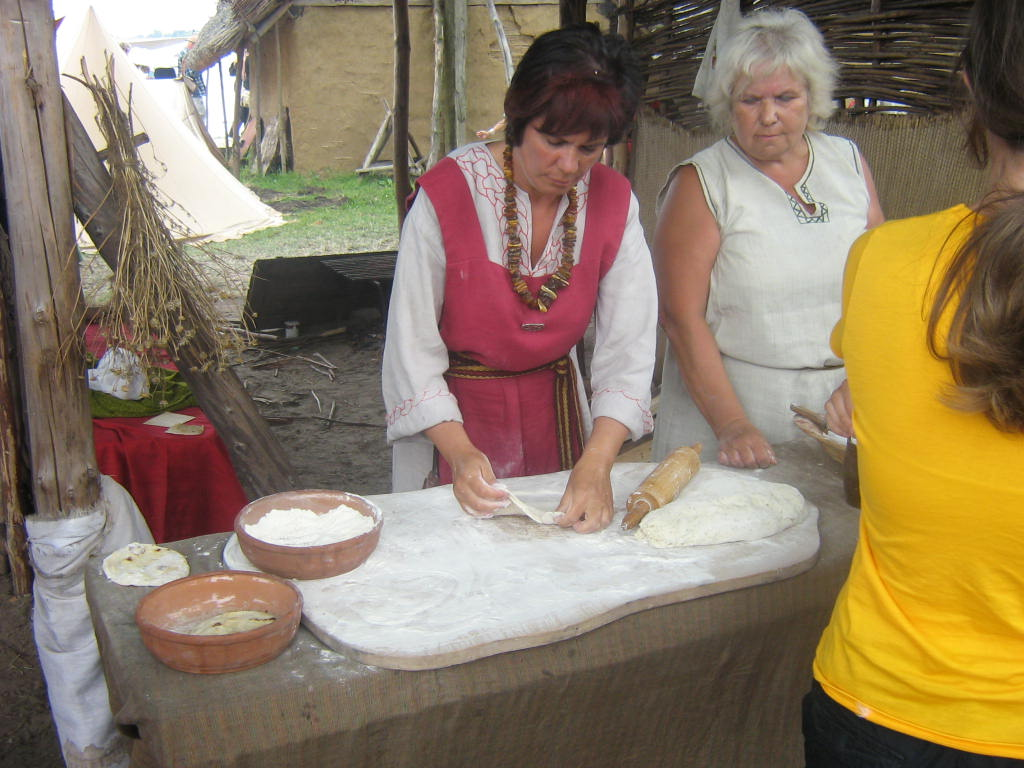
Preparation of podpłomyki

The method of preparation of podpłomyki has been unchanged for thousands of years. The basic ingredient is flour, mainly wheat flour, which, due to the greatest elasticity of the dough prepared from it, allows the formation of large flatbreads. Salt, water and, depending on preferences, herbs or spices are also added to the mixture from which the flatbreads are prepared; nigella and caraway seeds are most commonly used. Sometimes milk or sourdough is added to the water. The ingredients are mixed to make an elastic dough. At the end of this process, oval pancakes are formed from the dough with a rolling pin and placed on a heated, dry (fatless) frying pan, and roasted on both sides.

The archaic method involves baking the flatbreads in the embers of a fire or on stones heated by fire, and in later methods, baking the breads on a stone or cast iron surface placed over the hearth. Some sources claim that, as seen in the name podpłomyk – 'below-the-flame', the archaic method for preparing the flatbreads involved baking them under a flame, just as potatoes are baked in the embers of a bonfire.

== History ==
Flatbreads similar to podpłomyki were prepared by the early Slavs, who ate them as a side dish, equivalent to bread's function today. This remained the case until the Middle Ages, or for as long as fresh bread was not widely available. During this time, leavened bread was only baked sporadically and was usually wholemeal bread made with a sourdough starter baked in a bread oven; such ovens were rare among the poor and thus often communally owned. The now-widespread white bread, prepared from refined white flour, was a luxury product widely available only to the wealthiest parts of society. For the poorer population, it was a festive food eaten in the form of cakes prepared for ritual holidays; thus, the Slavic peoples living in medieval Poland most often prepared podpłomyki as their staple bread. These earlier forms of podpłomyki were sometimes made with the leftover sourdough from breadmaking. The eating of podpłomyki persisted until the mid-19th century among those who could not afford an enclosed stove, and were traditionally eaten as a breakfast food on Saturdays, eventually becoming a popular flatbread in Polish cuisine.

In certain regions of Poland, such as the south-east, a podpłomyk may be made to test the temperature of the baker's oven before the first batch of bread is made. For this purpose, a flatbread about 30 cm in diameter is made of the same dough as the bread. After preheating the oven, it is the first dough to be baked. If it is ready after a specific time, the bread itself can be placed in the oven. If the podpłomyk is undercooked, the oven must be heated additionally.

=== Contemporary popularity ===
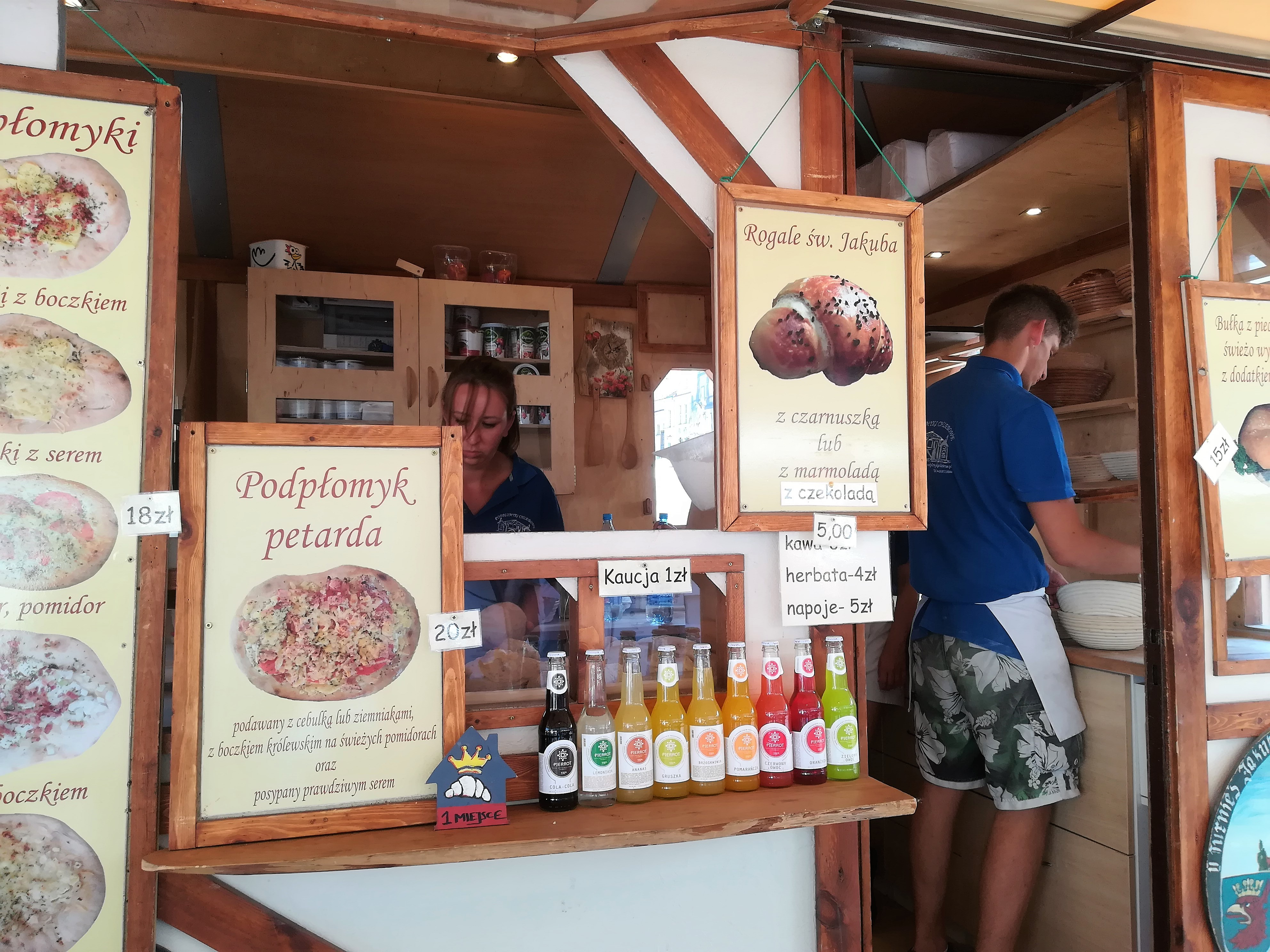
Podpłomyki with various toppings being sold as street food at a festival in Poznań, Poland

Today, podpłomyki are baked in Poland as a bread substitute. Sodium bicarbonate (baking soda) may be added to them, in which case they are called sodziaki; similar to, or the same as regional Polish bread rolls known as proziaki. They may be eaten with honey or konfitura (a kind of jam), and are frequently served with sweet or soured milk.

After a recent surge in their popularity, podpłomyki have also begun to be used as a base for zapiekanki-style snacks sold as fast food, similar to Hungarian lángos. Toppings include boczek (smoked pork belly), cheese, tomato, potato, onion, and others.

== See also ==
- Proziaki
- Opłatek
