= Cong you bing =

Chinese savory flatbread

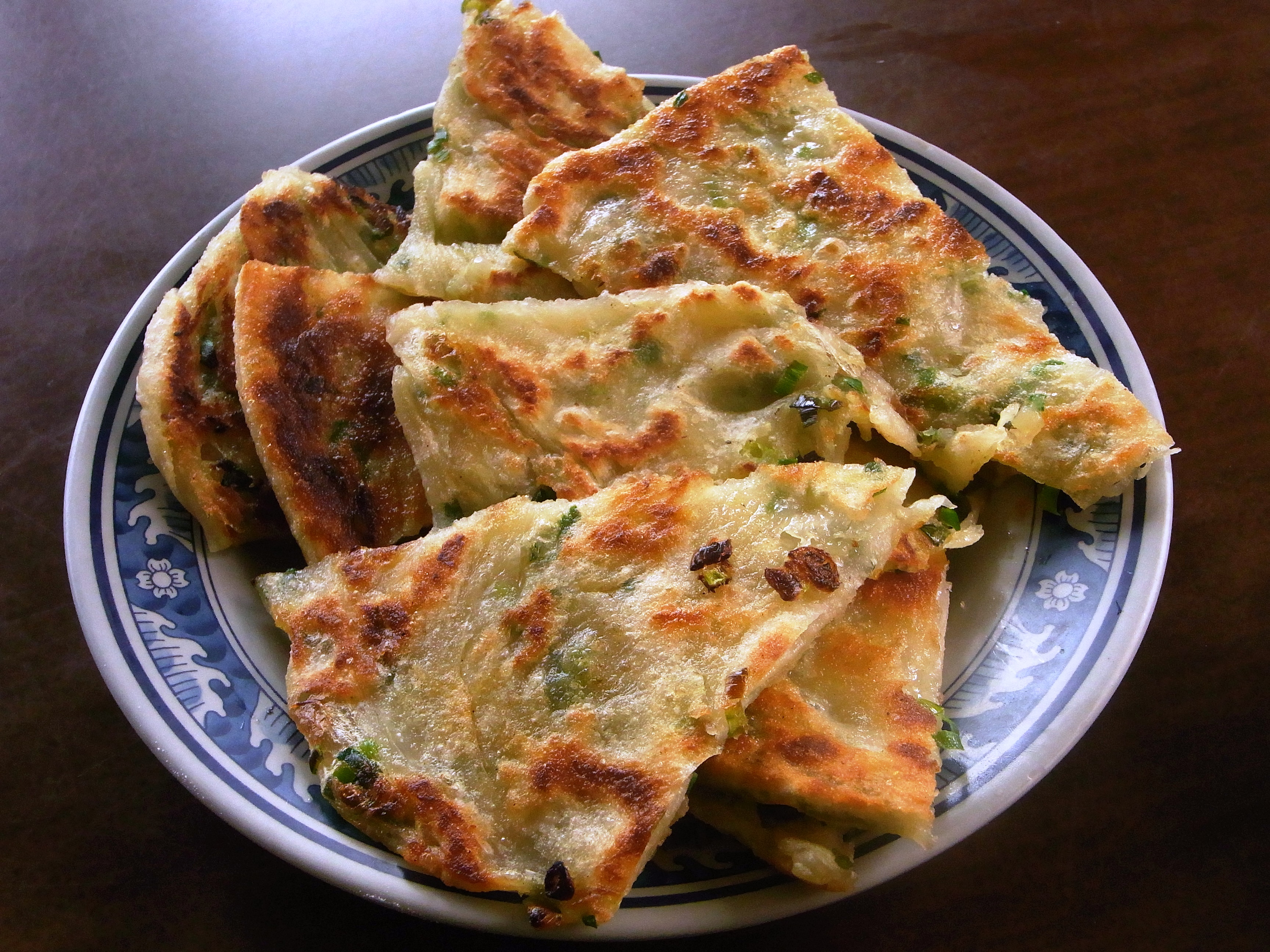
- Spring onion pancakes in Taichung
- Alternative names: Scallion pancake, green onion pancake, spring onion pancake
- Type: Bing
- Place of origin: China
- Main ingredients: Wheat flour, scallions

Cong you bing
- Traditional Chinese: 蔥 油 餅
- Simplified Chinese: 葱 油 饼
- Literal meaning: scallion oil pancake
Transcriptions
Standard Mandarin
- Hanyu Pinyin: cōng yóu bǐng
- Wade–Giles: Ts'ung^{1}-yu^{2}-ping^{3}
Yue: Cantonese
- Jyutping: cung1 jau4 beng2
Southern Min
- Hokkien POJ: chhong iû péng

Cong you bing (/ˈtsʊŋ joʊ ˌbɪŋ/; Chinese: 蔥油餅; pinyin: cōngyóubǐng; lit. 'scallion oil pancake'), also known as scallion pancake or green onion pancake, is a Chinese savory flatbread made with wheat dough and minced scallions.

The unleavened dough is folded repeatedly into layers, with oil and green onions added between each layer. Then it is pan-fried, which gives it crisp edges and a chewy texture. Many layers make up the interior, contributing to its chewy texture. Variations exist on the basic method of preparation that incorporate other flavors and fillings.

Scallion pancakes are served both as a street food item and as a restaurant dish. They are also sold commercially, either fresh or frozen in plastic packages (often in Asian supermarkets).

== Variations and ingredients ==
Other ingredients, such as chopped fennel greens and sesame seeds, are sometimes added with the green onions.

When using garlic chives (jiucai), these pancakes are called jiucai bing (韭菜餅) or jiucai you bing (韭菜油餅).

In Cambodia, cong you bing is known as num pang chen (នំប៉័ងចិន lit. 'Chinese bread'), and it is a popular street food that is both baked and fried, rather than simply being fried like its Chinese counterpart.

In Taiwanese cuisine, egg pancakes (蛋餅) are sauteed with egg coated on one side, with thinner, moister dough.

In North America, the pancakes may be served with a dipping sauce including soy sauce and Chinkiang or rice wine vinegar.

In Edmonton, Canada, the pancakes, locally known as "green onion cake", were introduced to Edmonton in 1978 by Siu To. While his version maintains the pan-fried cooking method, a derivative known as "green onion donut" started to appear around 2015 after Siu To left for Vancouver, where the cake is deep-fried.

== Gallery ==
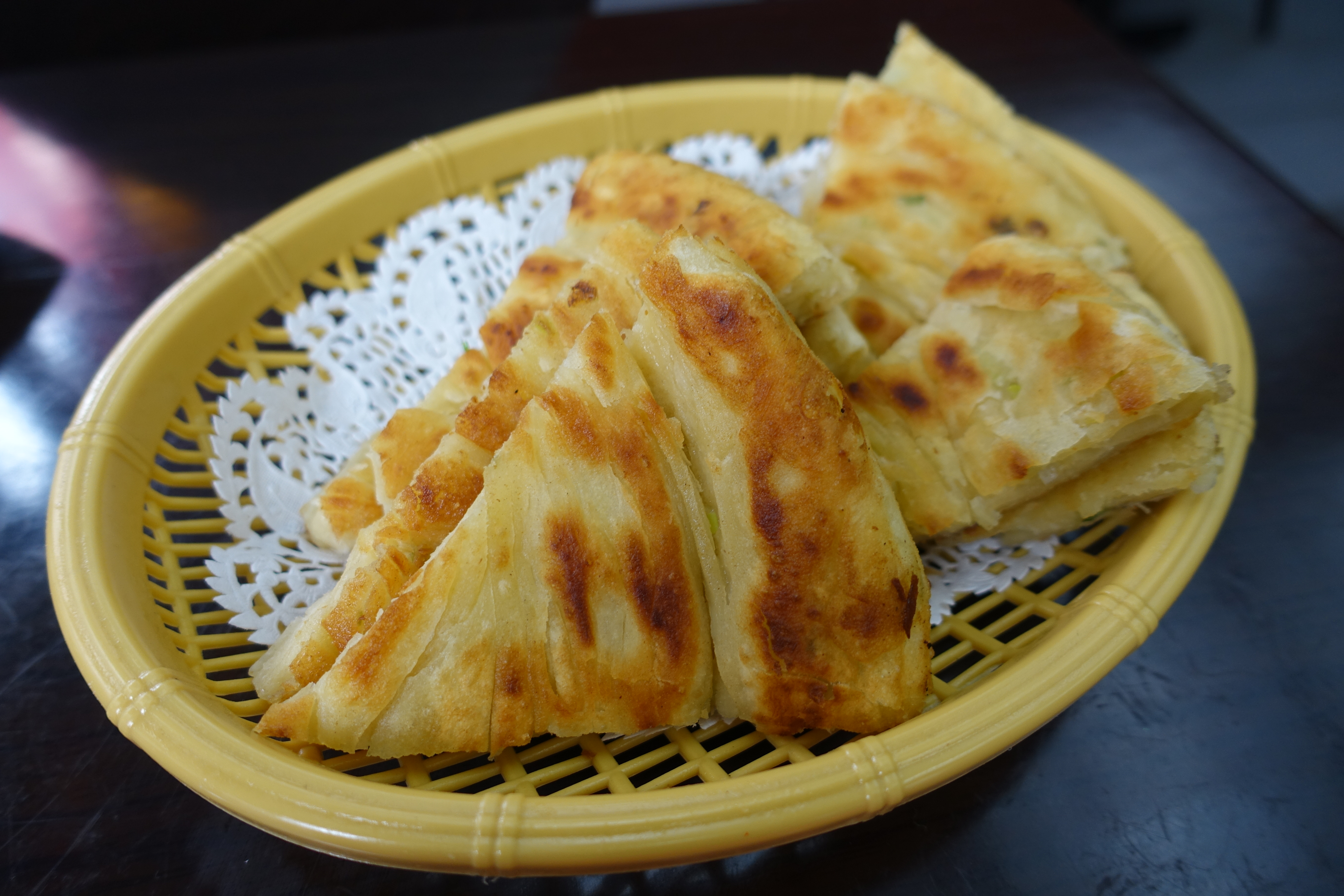

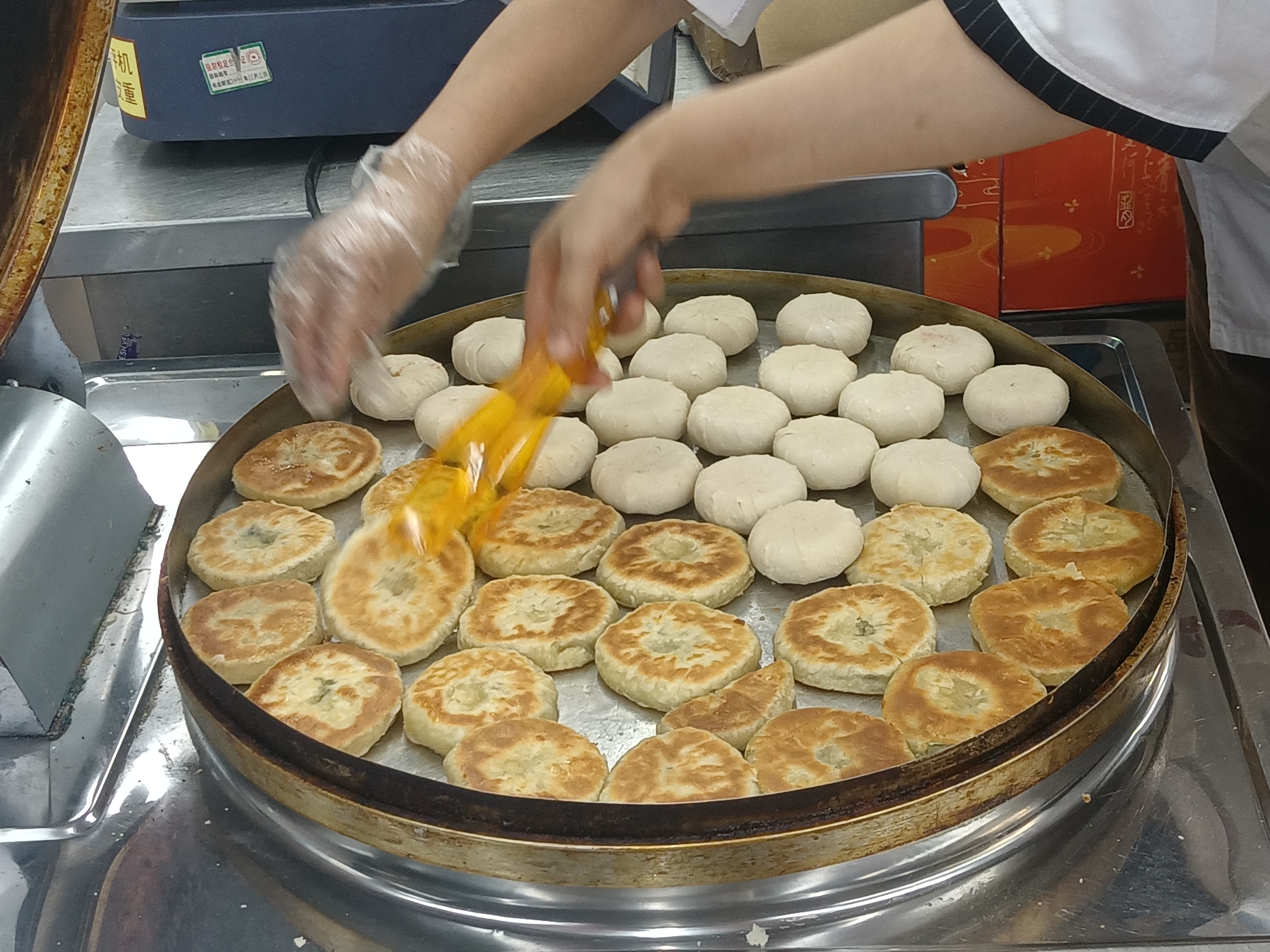

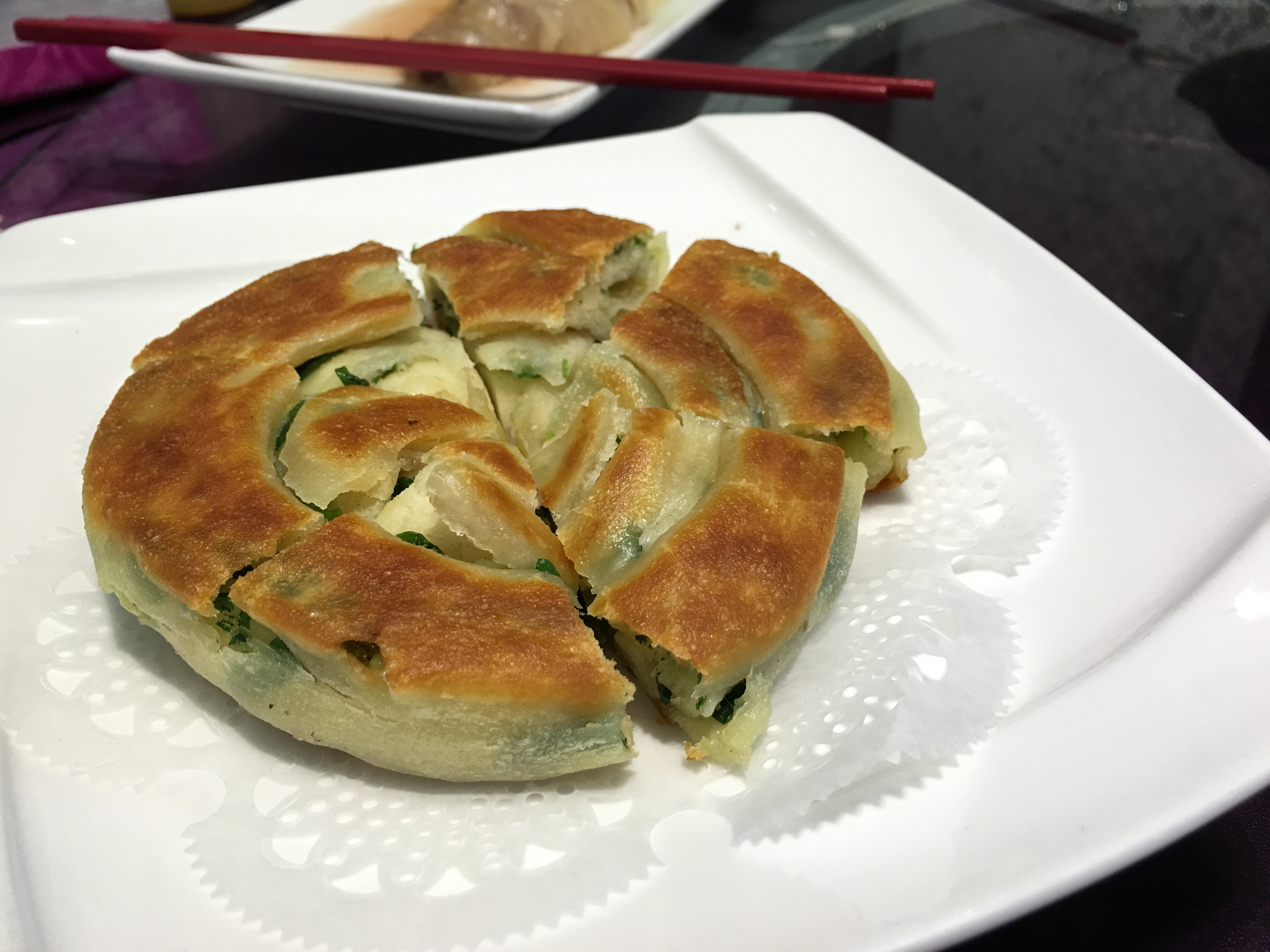

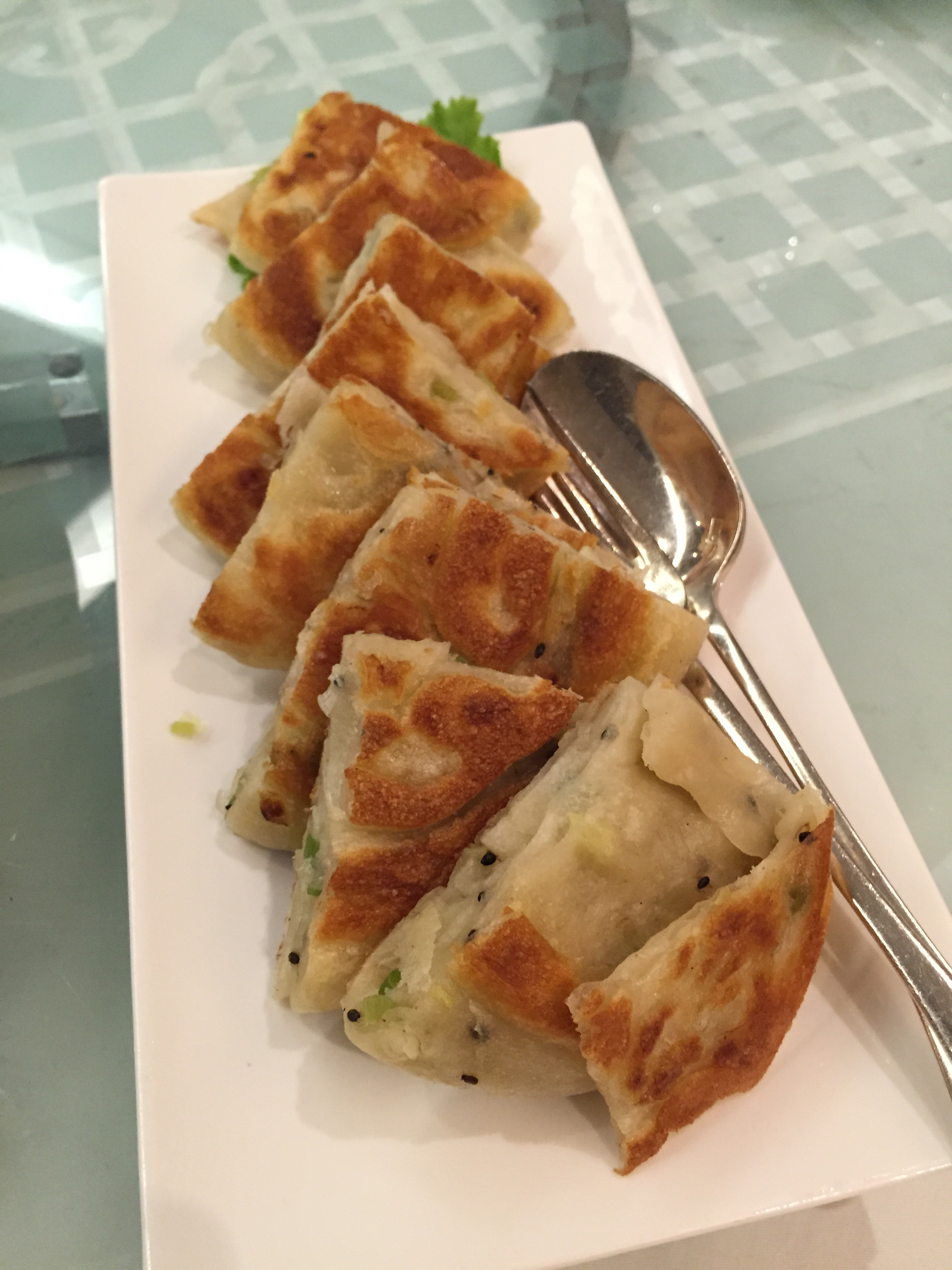

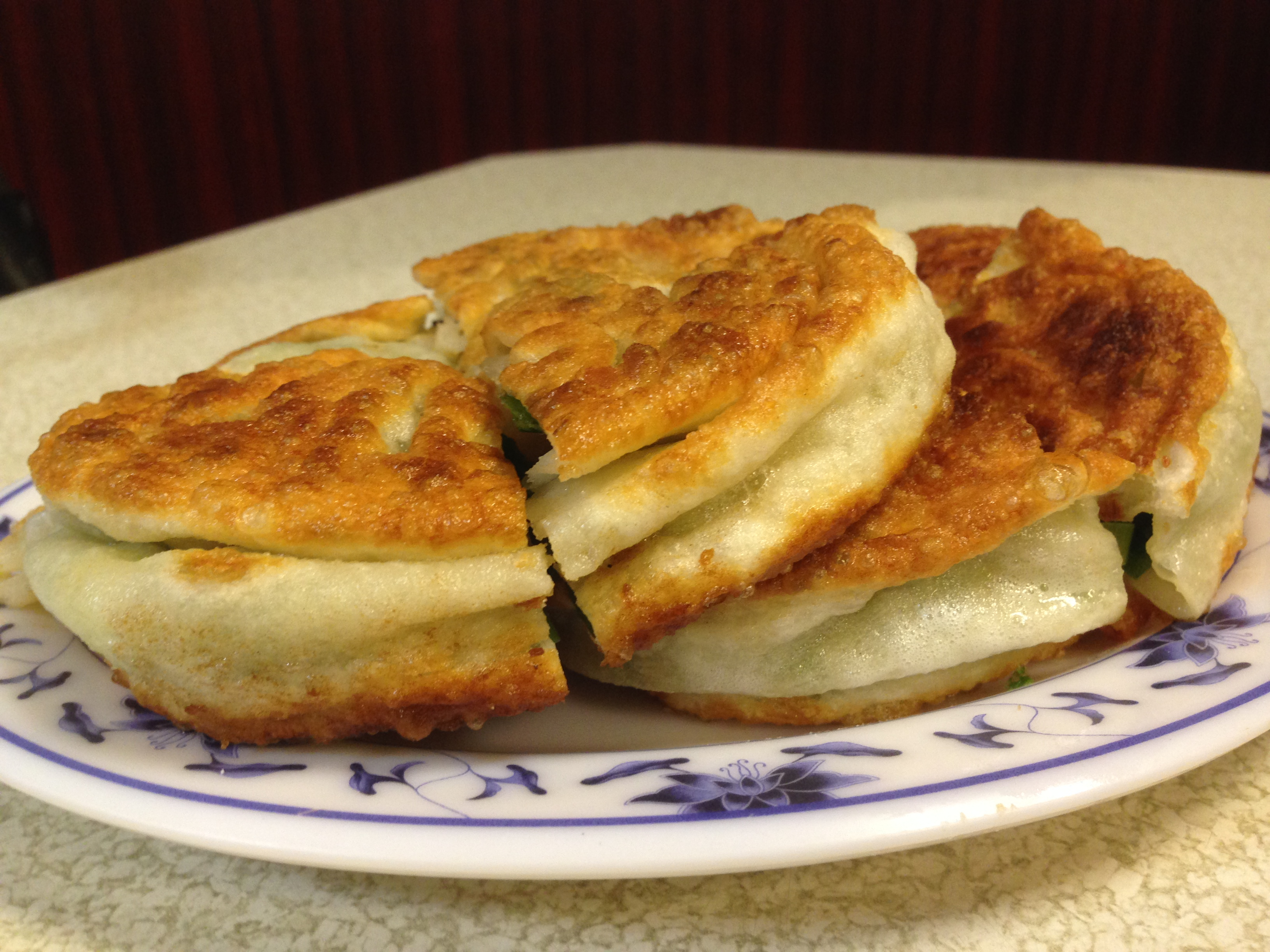

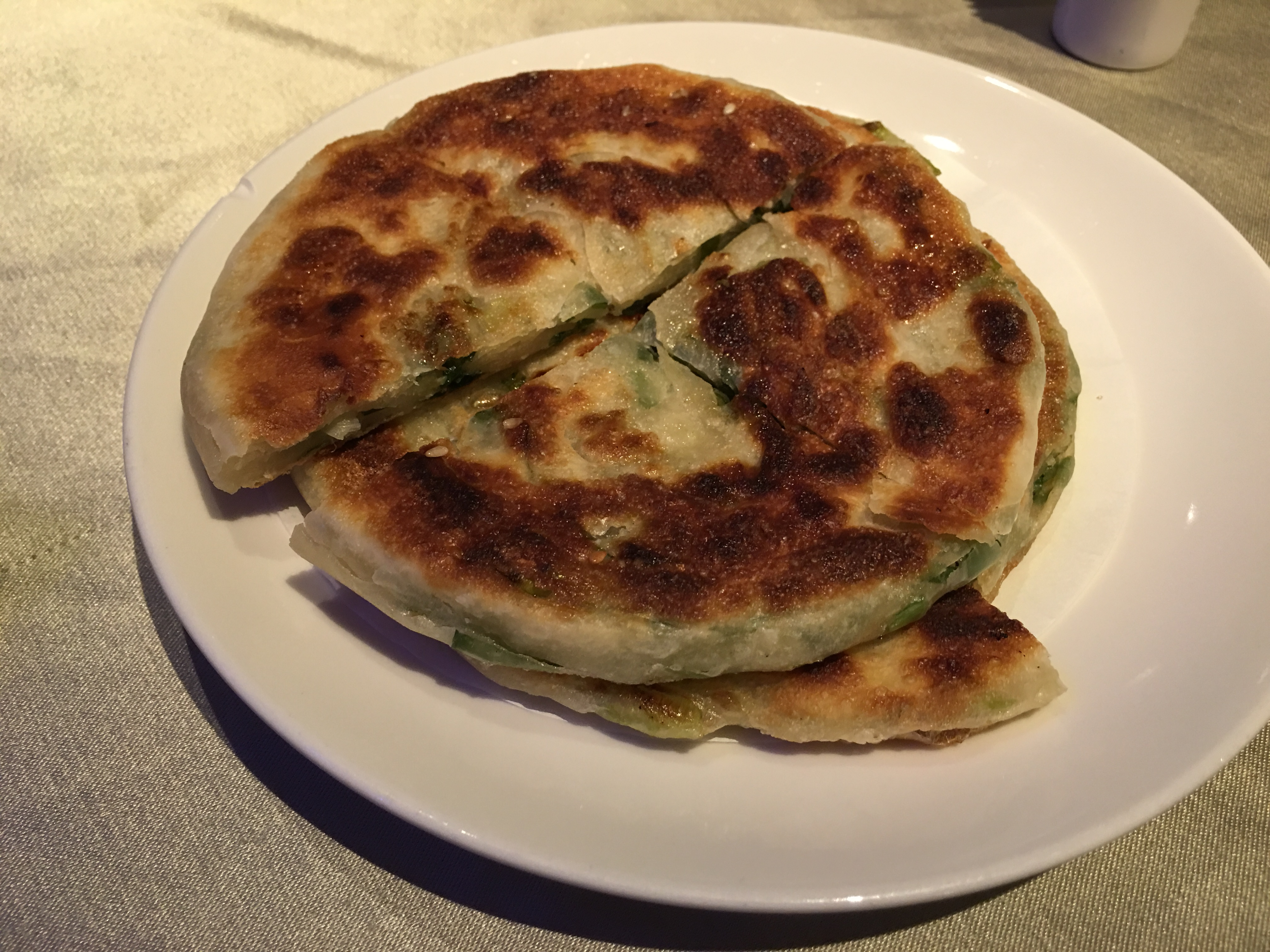

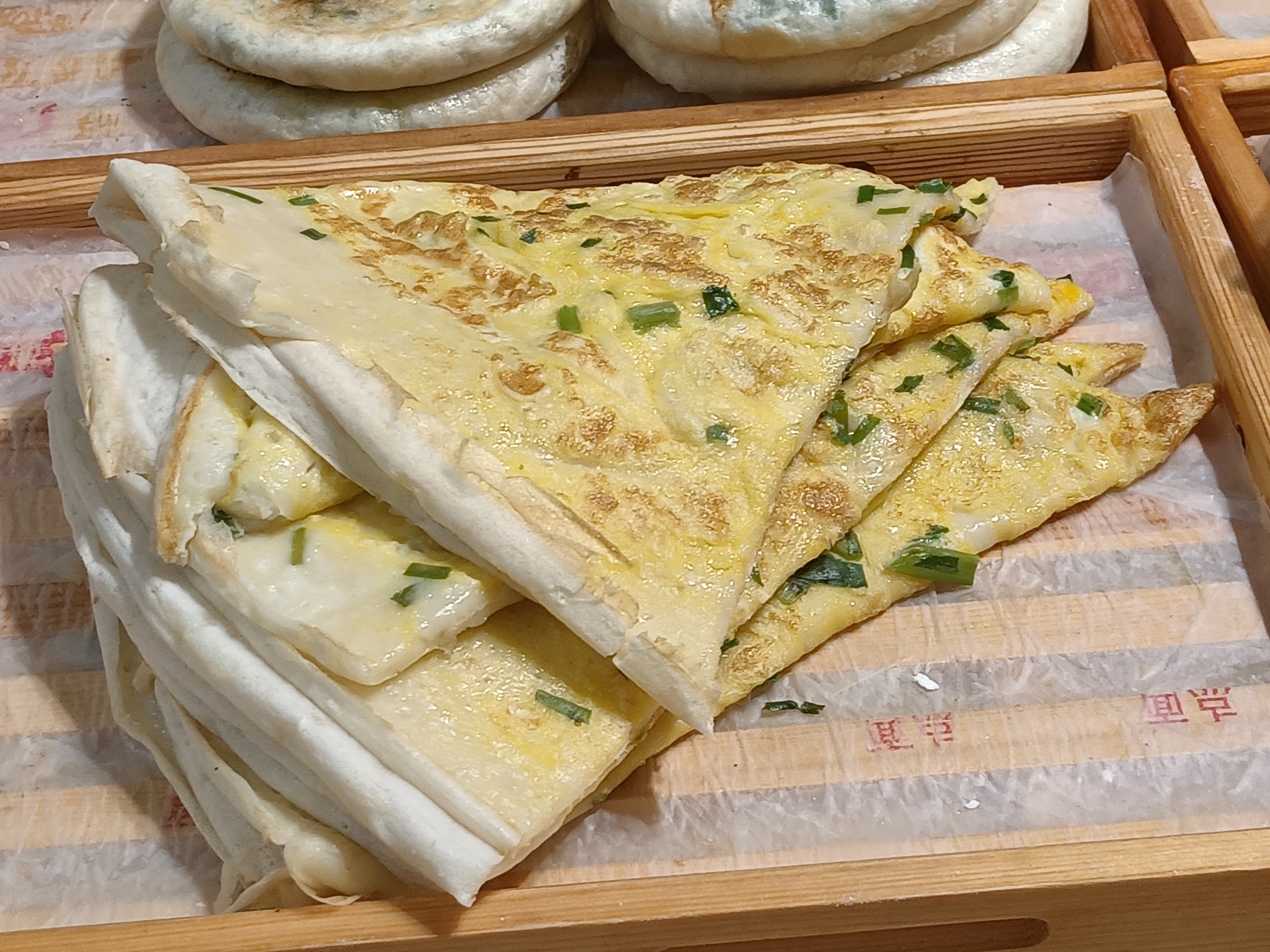
Taiwanese danbing, with eggs and scallion

== Similar dishes ==
Similar dishes in Chinese culture, and in other cultures, exist:

- China

- Laobing
- Shaobing

- Elsewhere

- Bánh xèo (Vietnamese)
- Negiyaki (ねぎ焼き) variant of okonomiyaki (Japanese)
- Num pang chen (Cambodian)
- Pajeon (Korean)
- Parotta (South Indian)
- Podpłomyk (Polish)
- Marase'e (Saudi Arabian)
- Murtabak (Yemeni)

== See also ==
- List of Chinese dishes
- List of onion dishes
- List of pancakes
