= Laobing =

Chinese flatbread

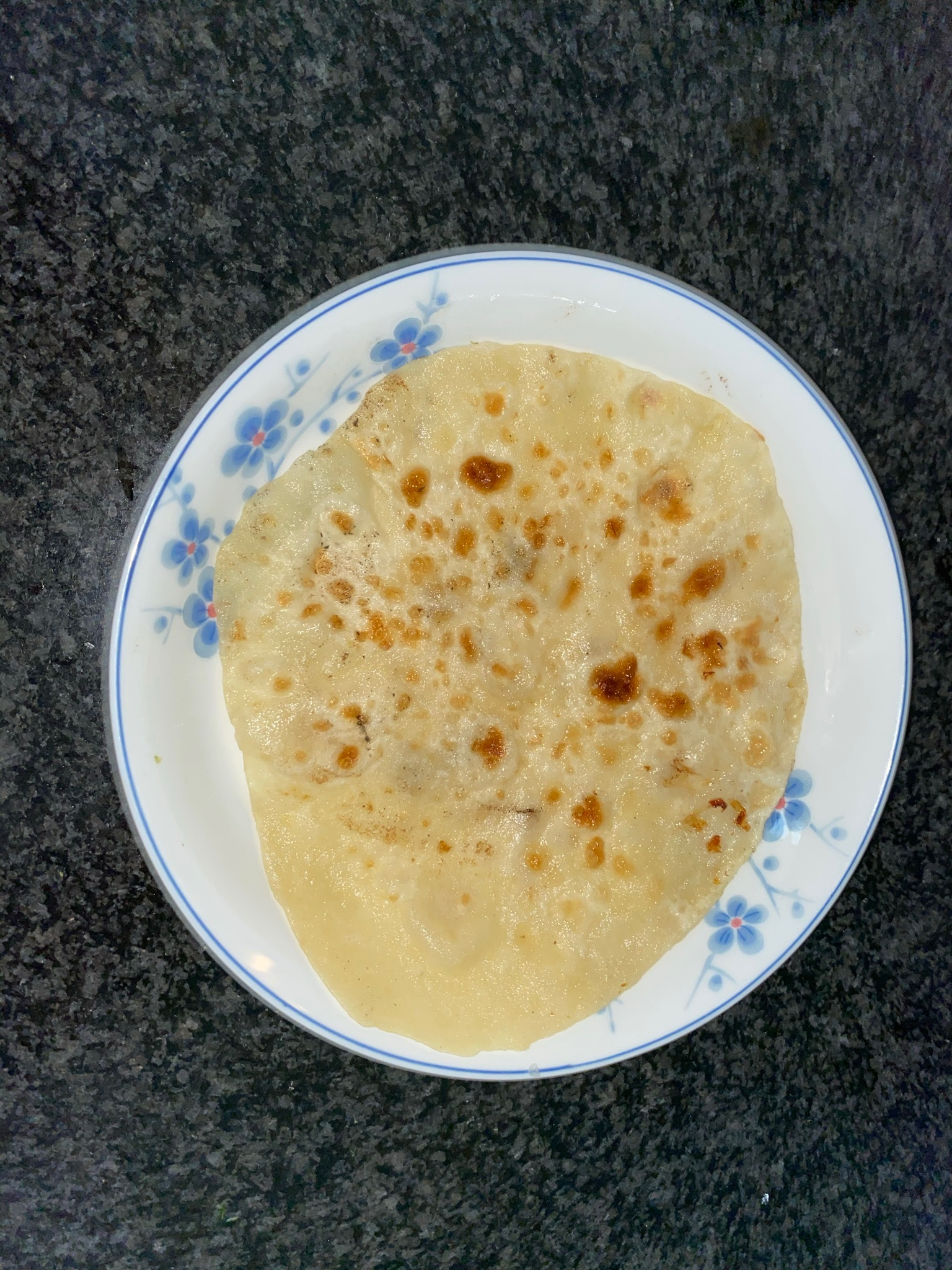
- homemade laobing
- Type: Flatbread
- Place of origin: China
- Main ingredients: Salt, flour, water

Laobing
- Traditional Chinese: 烙餠
- Simplified Chinese: 烙饼
Transcriptions
Standard Mandarin
- Hanyu Pinyin: làobǐng
Yue: Cantonese
- Jyutping: lok3 beng2

Laobing (also: Luobing; Chinese: 烙餠; pinyin: làobǐng, lùobǐng) is a type of unleavened flatbread popular in parts of northern China, including Beijing. It is sometimes referred to as a Chinese pancake.

Laobing can be the size of a large pizza, about one centimeter thick, and is doughy and chewy in texture. The bing is made by pan frying a rolled and layered unleavened dough consisting of salt, flour, and water. Most laobing are plain, although some have scallions or brown sugar inside the pastry. Laobing is usually cut into slices and served as a staple food, or can be stir-fried with meat and vegetables to make chaobing (stir-fried Chinese pancakes).

== See also ==
- Scallion pancake
- Guokui
- Paratha
- Roti canai
- Wrap (sandwich)
